= List of Mad Men characters =

This is a list of fictional characters in the television series Mad Men, all of whom have appeared in multiple episodes.

== Overview ==
| Actor | Character | Seasons | | | | | | | |
| Actor | Character | 1 | 2 | 3 | 4 | 5 | 6 | 7a | 7b |
=== Main characters ===
| Jon Hamm | Don Draper | Main | Main | Main | Main | Main | Main | Main | Main |
| Elisabeth Moss | Peggy Olson | Main | Main | Main | Main | Main | Main | Main | Main |
| Vincent Kartheiser | Pete Campbell | Main | Main | Main | Main | Main | Main | Main | Main |
| January Jones | Betty Draper | Main | Main | Main | Main | Main | Main | Main | Main |
| Christina Hendricks | Joan Holloway | Main | Main | Main | Main | Main | Main | Main | Main |
| Bryan Batt | Salvatore Romano | Main | Main | Main | | | | | |
| Michael Gladis | Paul Kinsey | Main | Main | Main | | Guest | | | |
| Aaron Staton | Ken Cosgrove | Main | Main | Main | Main | Main | Main | Main | Main |
| Rich Sommer | Harry Crane | Main | Main | Main | Main | Main | Main | Main | Main |
| Maggie Siff | Rachel Menken | Main | Guest | | | | | | Guest |
| John Slattery | Roger Sterling | Recurring ^{1} | Main | Main | Main | Main | Main | Main | Main |
| Robert Morse | Bert Cooper | Recurring | Recurring | Main | Main | Main | Main | Main | Guest |
| Jared Harris | Lane Pryce | | | Recurring | Main | Main | | | |
| Kiernan Shipka | Sally Draper | Recurring | Recurring | Recurring | Main | Main | Main | Main | Main |
| Jessica Paré | Megan Draper | | | | Recurring | Main | Main | Main | Main |
| Christopher Stanley | Henry Francis | | | Recurring | Recurring | Main | Main | Main | Main |
| Jay R. Ferguson | Stan Rizzo | | | | Recurring | Main | Main | Main | Main |
| Kevin Rahm | Ted Chaough | | | | Recurring | Recurring | Main | Main | Main |
| Ben Feldman | Michael Ginsberg | | | | | Recurring | Main | Main | |
| Mason Vale Cotton | Bobby Draper | Recurring^{2} | | | | | Main | Main | Main |
=== Recurring characters ===
| Mark Moses | Duck Phillips | Recurring | Recurring | Recurring | Recurring | | Recurring | | Guest |
| Alison Brie | Trudy Campbell | Recurring | Recurring | Recurring | Recurring | Recurring | Recurring | Guest | Recurring |
| Joel Murray | Freddy Rumsen | Recurring | Recurring | | Recurring | Guest | | Recurring | |
| Anne Dudek | Francine Hanson | Recurring | Recurring | Recurring | Guest | | | Guest | |
| Talia Balsam | Mona Sterling | Recurring | Recurring | Recurring | | Guest | Recurring | Recurring | |
| Marten Holden Weiner | Glen Bishop | Recurring | Guest | | Recurring | Recurring | Guest | | Guest |
| Darby Stanchfield | Helen Bishop | Recurring | Guest | | | | | | |
| Rosemarie DeWitt | Midge Daniels | Recurring | | | Guest | | | | |
| Jay Paulson | Adam Whitman | Recurring | | | | Guest | | | |
| Joe O'Connor | Tom Vogel | Recurring | Guest | | Recurring | | Guest | | |
| Elizabeth Rice | Margaret Sterling | Recurring | Guest | Recurring | | | Recurring | Recurring | |
| Andy Umberger | Arnold Wayne | Recurring | | | | | | | |
| Crista Flanagan | Lois Sadler | Recurring | Recurring | Recurring | | | | | |
| Julie McNiven | Hildy | Recurring | Recurring | Recurring | | | | | |
| Alexa Alemanni | Allison | Recurring | Guest | Recurring | Recurring | | | | |
| Deborah Lacey | Carla | Guest | Recurring | Recurring | Recurring | | | | |
| Ryan Cutrona | Gene Hofstadt | Guest | Guest | Recurring | | | | | |
| Peyton List | Jane Sterling | | Recurring | Recurring | Recurring | Recurring | Recurring | | |
| Sam Page | Greg Harris | | Recurring | Recurring | Recurring | Guest | | | |
| Myra Turley | Katherine Olson | | Recurring | Guest | Guest | Guest | | | |
| Audrey Wasilewski | Anita Olson Respola | | Recurring | Recurring | Guest | | | | |
| Melinda Page Hamilton | Anna Draper | | Recurring | | Recurring | | | | |
| Melinda McGraw | Bobbie Barrett | | Recurring | | | | | | |
| Patrick Fischler | Jimmy Barrett | | Recurring | | | | | | |
| Colin Hanks | Father John Gill | | Recurring | | | | | | |
| Abigail Spencer | Suzanne Farrell | | | Recurring | | | | | |
| Chelcie Ross | Conrad Hilton | | | Recurring | | | | | |
| Ryan Cartwright | John Hooker | | | Recurring | | | | | |
| Embeth Davidtz | Rebecca Pryce | | | Recurring | | Recurring | | | |
| Beth Hall | Caroline | | | | Recurring | Recurring | Recurring | Recurring | Recurring |
| Alexandra Ella | Clara | | | | Recurring | Recurring | Recurring | Recurring | |
| Charlie Hofheimer | Abe Drexler | | | | Recurring | Recurring | Recurring | | |
| Zosia Mamet | Joyce Ramsay | | | | Recurring | Guest | | | |
| Cara Buono | Faye Miller | | | | Recurring | | | | |
| Matt Long | Joey Baird | | | | Recurring | | | | |
| Randee Heller | Ida Blankenship | | | | Recurring | | | | |
| Danny Strong | Danny Siegel | | | | Recurring | | Guest | | |
| Julia Ormond | Marie Calvet | | | | | Recurring | Guest | | Recurring |
| Stephanie Drake | Meredith | | | | | Recurring | Recurring | Recurring | Recurring |
| Teyonah Parris | Dawn Chambers | | | | | Recurring | Recurring | Recurring | Guest |
| Christine Estabrook | Gail Holloway | | | | | Recurring | Recurring | Guest | Guest |
| Trevor Einhorn | John Mathis | | | | | | Recurring | Recurring | Recurring |
| Kit Williamson | Ed Gifford | | | | | | Recurring | Recurring | Recurring |
| Allan Havey | Lou Avery | | | | | | Recurring | Recurring | Recurring |
| Harry Hamlin | Jim Cutler | | | | | | Recurring | Recurring | |
| James Wolk | Bob Benson | | | | | | Recurring | Guest | |
| Linda Cardellini | Sylvia Rosen | | | | | | Recurring | | Guest |
| Brian Markinson | Arnold Rosen | | | | | | Recurring | | Guest |
| Sola Bamis | Shirley | | | | | | | Recurring | Recurring |
| Jessy Schram | Bonnie Whiteside | | | | | | | Recurring | |
| Bruce Greenwood | Richard Burghoff | | | | | | | | Recurring |

Cast notes

* ^1 Credited as a special guest star.

* ^2 Maxwell Huckabee and Aaron Hart have split the role of Bobby Draper in the first season, while Hart takes over for the second season. Jared Gilmore plays Bobby throughout the third and fourth seasons.

== Primary characters ==
=== Don Draper ===
Donald "Don" Draper (né Dick Whitman; Jon Hamm) born in 1926, is the creative director at Sterling Cooper Advertising Agency; he eventually rises to become a partner. He later becomes a founding partner at Sterling Cooper Draper Pryce. Draper is the series' protagonist, and more story lines focus on him than on other characters.

=== Peggy Olson ===
Margaret "Peggy" Olson (Elisabeth Moss), upon introduction, is the ostensibly naïve "new girl" at Sterling Cooper. She was originally Draper's secretary, but showed surprising talent and initiative, including a knack for understanding the consumer's mind. Don promotes her to copywriter, and she eventually accepts a copy chief position with Ted Chaough's firm, CGC, only to find herself once again working for Don following a merger. Peggy's first campaign is for Belle Jolie lipstick; she is promoted to junior copywriter on the same day that she goes into labor. Peggy either hid or was in denial about her pregnancy; she gives birth to a boy conceived with Pete Campbell, with whom she had a couple of one night stands. After her return to Sterling Cooper, she continues to have success as a copy writer and eventually loses her little girl style, cuts her hair, and begins to dress more like an adult, but with subtle nods to her Catholic school girl upbringing.

=== Pete Campbell ===
Peter "Pete" Campbell (Vincent Kartheiser) is an ambitious young account executive whose father-in-law controls the advertising for Clearasil, a Sterling Cooper account. Born with a silver spoon in his mouth, he becomes more competitive with Don as the series progresses, and ultimately becomes a partner of Sterling Cooper Draper Pryce.

=== Betty (Draper) Francis ===
Elizabeth "Betty" Francis (née Hofstadt, formerly Draper; January Jones) is the ex-wife of Don Draper (who affectionately called her "Betts," or on occasion "Birdy") and mother of their three children, Sally, Bobby, and Gene. Her family home was in Elkins Park, Pa., and she graduated from Bryn Mawr College. She speaks fluent Italian. She is the archetypal dissatisfied 1960s housewife, who dutifully turned her back on her education and professional career (as a model) to become a homemaker. After obtaining a divorce from Don, she marries Henry Francis and moves to Rye in late 1965. Despite no longer being married to Don, Betty is shown to harbor feelings for him.

=== Joan Harris ===
Joan P. Harris (née Holloway; Christina Hendricks) is first depicted as an office manager at Sterling Cooper, who acts as a professional and social mentor, as well as an occasional rival, to Peggy Olson, much as Don Draper is to Pete Campbell. Throughout the course of the series, Joan has a long-standing affair with Roger Sterling, which results in their conceiving a son. She ascribes the boy's fatherhood to her husband, a physician serving as a military officer in Vietnam, whom she later divorces. Joan eventually rises up to the level of partner at Sterling Cooper Draper Pryce and the following SC&P, and chooses to create her own firm after SC&P is absorbed by McCann Erickson.

=== Roger Sterling ===
Roger H. Sterling, Jr. (John Slattery), is one of the two managing partners of Sterling Cooper, and later a founding partner at Sterling Cooper Draper Pryce. Roger's relationship with Lucky Strike, one of Sterling Cooper's most lucrative accounts, is key to the story from the outset.

== Supporting characters ==
=== Sal Romano ===
Sal Romano
- First appearance: "Smoke Gets in Your Eyes" (1.01)
- Last appearance: "Wee Small Hours" (3.09)
- Created by: Matthew Weiner
- Portrayed by: Bryan Batt

In-universe information
- Full name: Salvatore Romano
- Nickname: Sal
- Occupation: Art Director (seasons 1–3)
- Family: Mrs. Romano (mother)
- Spouse: Kitty Romano (wife)

Salvatore "Sal" Romano (Bryan Batt) is the Italian-American art director at Sterling Cooper, from Baltimore. Sal turned down a proposition from a male employee of Belle Jolie Cosmetics midway through the first season, admitting that though he has thought about having relationships with men, he has never acted on this impulse. He joins the other men of Sterling Cooper in flirting with the women in the workplace. He speaks to his mother in Italian. Sal is shown to have a sarcastic side to his personality, mocking Pete after he nearly loses his job and laughing at Freddy Rumsen urinating himself. Between Seasons 1 and 2, Sal marries a childhood friend, Kitty (Sarah Drew). The two entertain Ken Cosgrove for dinner during the Season 2 episode "The Gold Violin", during which Sal seems taken with his guest. Kitty shows signs of frustration at being ignored, expressing that something is wrong in their marriage.

In the Season 3 premiere, Don Draper sees Sal alone with a partly dressed, male hotel bellhop, but subtly assures Sal he will keep silent by drawing Sal's attention to the ad slogan they had been working on for raincoats: "Limit your exposure". Later in the third season, with Don's encouragement, Sal branches out into directing commercials for the company. Meanwhile, Sal and Kitty have not had sex in several months and Kitty tells Sal she needs "tending to". He assures her that he loves her, but his mind is elsewhere due to pressures at work. Illustrations popular in magazine advertisements in the 1950s and early 1960s are going out of style in favor of photographs, so he fears he will lose his job as an illustrator. Later in the scene, Kitty is in bed and Sal vividly demonstrates how the Ann-Margret look-alike will dance and sing "Bye Bye Birdie" in his commercial, with lyrics changed for Pepsi's new diet drink Patio. Kitty nods but appears uncomfortable with Sal's flamboyant performance.

In the Season 3 episode "Wee Small Hours", Sal rejects the advances of Lee Garner, Jr., a married Lucky Strike executive who, in retaliation, calls Harry Crane and demands Sal's removal from the account. When Harry fails to pass this on, Garner walks out of a subsequent meeting. Roger fires Sal on the spot. Don supports Roger's decision on the basis that the company can afford to lose him rather than Lucky Strike and regards Sal with disdain, implying that he should have just given Garner what he wanted. In Sal's last appearance, he calls his wife late at night from a payphone located in a park, a group of men nearby. He does not tell her he has been fired, only that he will be arriving home late.

=== Paul Kinsey ===
Paul Kinsey
- First appearance: "Smoke Gets in Your Eyes" (1.01)
- Last appearance: "Christmas Waltz" (5.10)
- Created by: Matthew Weiner
- Portrayed by: Michael Gladis

In-universe information
- Occupation: Copywriter
- Romances: Joan Harris (ex-lover); Sheila White (ex-girlfriend)

Paul Kinsey (Michael Gladis) is a copywriter at Sterling Cooper. Kinsey initially features as part of the group of unmarried or childless young ad men in the Sterling Cooper office, who spend a lot of their time drinking, flirting, and gossiping. Paul tries out a lot of identities for himself throughout the series, never seeming to feel comfortable where he belongs. In addition to his creative duties at Sterling Cooper, Paul is a writer who considers advertising a temporary gig until his career takes off, and in the Season 1 episode "Nixon vs. Kennedy", his drunken co-workers find a play he wrote and act it out, although it is not very good, and it seems to ridicule a lot of his co-workers. Paul dated Joan prior to the beginning of the series, but Joan split up with him because he bragged about their relationship around the office; according to Joan, Paul "has a big mouth". When a then-naive Peggy begins to work at Sterling Cooper as Don's secretary, Paul hits on her, but Peggy rejects him, as she is secretly attracted to Pete. In Season 2, Paul dates Sheila, a black assistant manager in South Orange who is involved in the Civil Rights Movement. Joan initially makes fun of his relationship with his black girlfriend, as she believes he is seeing her only to appear interesting. At their first meeting, Joan microaggressively tells Sheila that she never "took Paul to be open-minded". Sheila dumps Paul while they are registering black voters in the South, after he whines and frets about his safety in the region over hers. He is "slumming" by living in a run-down neighborhood popular among beatniks in Montclair, New Jersey, and espouses more Bohemian ideas and attitudes than his fellow young copywriters. Joan, however, mocks him for this lifestyle, proclaiming that he is simply pretentious and wants to believe he is better than the people he works with. He steals an IBM Selectric typewriter from the Sterling Cooper offices because he says as a writer, he needs it. This leads to a secretary being blamed and almost fired. He is originally from New Jersey and attended Princeton on a scholarship, two facts he is eager to hide. A fan of science fiction and The Twilight Zone, he has a notably Kennedy-era fascination with space.

As opposed to other characters who smoke cigarettes, Paul smokes a pipe, another thing Joan calls him out on as a means of appearing more cultured. Kinsey is a moderate drinker and says he likes to get high "whenever [he] can".

In Season 2, Kinsey grows an Orson Welles beard and later quotes passages from Welles' War of the Worlds radio broadcast. He initially encourages Peggy to pursue copywriting, noting, "There are female copywriters", but it immediately becomes clear this is merely an attempt to seduce her. He later becomes jealous and pettily competitive when her skill becomes indisputable. He realizes Peggy and Don have creative "magic" together when it comes to advertising ideas and slogans and is annoyed, especially as his own contributions become less favored by Don and, as a result, diminish his importance at the firm. Paul expresses considerable anger when he realizes Peggy was chosen by Don to join the new agency Sterling Cooper Draper Pryce, while he was not.

In the Season 5 episode "Christmas Waltz", Kinsey reappears as a devotee of the Hare Krishna movement, which he has joined at least partly to win the affections of a woman. (His advertising career has apparently stalled, since he bounced between a few other agencies before becoming a Hare Krishna). He contacts Harry Crane to ask him to pass on his spec script for Star Trek to Harry's contacts at NBC. The script is terrible, but Harry, feeling guilty because he has had sex with Paul's Hare Krishna girlfriend, and not wanting to deal with Paul's problems, praises the script and gives Paul $500 and a ticket to Los Angeles so he can start afresh. He advises Paul not to submit the script to the Star Trek production team due to "studio politics," and instead recommends that he write his own original stories. Paul expresses considerable gratitude toward Harry, telling him he is the first person to actually do something for him, completely unaware of Harry's lies.

=== Ken Cosgrove ===
Ken Cosgrove
- Aaron Staton as Ken Cosgrove
- First appearance: "Smoke Gets in Your Eyes" (1.01)
- Last appearance: "Person to Person" (7.14)
- Created by: Matthew Weiner
- Portrayed by: Aaron Staton

In-universe information
- Full name: Kenneth Cosgrove
- Nicknames: Ken; Kenny
- Occupation: Account Executive; Freelance Writer
- Family: Mr. Cosgrove (father); Mrs. Cosgrove (mother)
- Spouse: Cynthia Baxter (wife)
- Children: Eddie Cosgrove (son)

Kenneth "Ken" Cosgrove (Aaron Staton) is an account executive at Sterling Cooper. Pete says Ken is the son of a salesman from Burlington, Vermont, and Ken tells Fillmore Auto Parts he grew up in rural Vermont. In Season 6, Ken tells Pete Campbell that he went to high school in Cabot, Vermont. Ken says his mother is heavyset and works as a nurse at a state hospital. He attended Columbia University, and before getting married lived in Murray Hill. He is easygoing, confident, and generally happy, with a genuine artist's skills. He writes as a hobby and took a job in advertising because he heard there was money in it. In the early seasons, he gives the impression of being successful at his job while not caring much about it, not seeming as ambitious as Pete Campbell and Harry Crane. He appears as a member of the younger set of junior account men and copywriters at Sterling Cooper, seeming to spend more office time drinking, flirting and gossiping than working. Ken has literary aspirations and has been published in The Atlantic Monthly, which excites the envy of Pete Campbell and Paul Kinsey.

In Season 2, it is revealed that Ken makes considerably more money than his co-worker Harry Crane ($300/week vs. $200/week). In Season 3, Ken and Pete are promoted, sharing the role of Accounts Director, which infuriates Pete (who wanted the job) while Ken is unruffled. While not as outwardly ambitious as Pete, he has proven to be a competent executive and an exceptionally talented creative thinker, eclipsing Pete as a rising star at Sterling Cooper. Eventually, Ken is promoted above Pete, to the latter's fury, particularly when Ken is blasé about the promotion and about learning that Pete is sharing the position with him. When he gets married he becomes the only one of the central characters on the show to never be shown cheating on his wife. He maintains a healthy separation between his personal and professional lives, refusing to use family connections to succeed.

Because Pete Campbell was approached first and agreed to join SCDP, Ken is not asked to join the new firm and is not seen in the earlier episodes in Season 4. It turns out that he leaves Sterling Cooper and goes to McCann Erickson. He eventually leaves for Geyer and later tells Pete that McCann was the worst agency he had ever seen. Ken admits to being unhappy and bored at Geyer and later joins SCDP, bringing Birds Eye and other clients with him, and agrees to serve under Pete. There are limits to what Ken will do, he refuses to try to bring his father-in-law's business over to SCDP because he does not want to mix his personal and professional lives, about which Pete has no scruples. Later in Season 4, Ken is having dinner with his fiancée, Cynthia and future in-laws when he learns that Lucky Strike, SCDP's biggest client by far, is taking their business to another agency.

In the Season 5 premiere he is happily married, and he and his new wife attend Don's surprise birthday party. Ken is still writing in his off-hours and has published science fiction stories using the pseudonym of Ben Hargrove, which the prestigious publishing house of Farrar Straus wants to publish, a fact he tries to keep secret from his co-workers. At the end of "Signal 30", Ken tells Peggy Olson that Roger Sterling is forcing him to abandon writing fiction as he feels it takes away time from his work for the firm. He continues to do so under the new pen name Dave Algonquin. In "Commissions and Fees" Don and Roger manage to secure Ken's father-in-law as a client on their own. Ken has no problem with working on the account since it was acquired without his help, but in exchange for feigning ignorance to Cynthia, Ken demands that Pete be excluded from the proceedings, likely a result of his lingering resentment for Pete telling Roger about his freelance writing.

In Season 6, Ken has been given a spacious office on SCDP's second floor, and appears to be on somewhat friendlier terms with Pete, even giving him advice when the latter finds himself in a very awkward situation. He dislikes the obsequious new employee Bob Benson. After the acquisition of the new Chevy account and the subsequent merger with CGC, Ken is assigned to deal with the account and has to be in Detroit more often. Ken's happy-go-lucky attitude begins to fade, and the number of things he has to do for work that he does not like, increase. He is forced to spend time away from his family in Detroit, and he is injured by the Chevy car executives while engaging in leisure activities with them. In "The Crash", while under the influence of a "mild stimulant" that is intended to help SCDP employees to work the extra hours needed on the Chevy account, Ken demonstrates that he is a talented tap dancer, but cannot remember clearly whether he learned the skill from his mother or his first girlfriend. In "Quality of Mercy", Ken is wounded in a hunting accident by a pair of Chevy executives and loses an eye. Deciding that Chevy is too much for him, he returns to New York full-time to support the newly pregnant Cynthia.

During Season 7, Ken reveals he has a son, Edward. Cynthia is growing frustrated with Ken facing increased pressure at work, and she encourages him to leave the advertising business and write the Great American Novel he has dreamed of doing. After his father-in-law retires from Dow Chemical, Ken presents him with a gift of golf clubs as a client. The same day, Roger, under pressure by McCann executives who are still angry at Ken leaving and taking the Birdseye account with him, fires him and gives his accounts to Pete. Ken, never really enamored of his job, was about to quit advertising and pursue Cynthia's suggestion to be a full-time writer, but being fired infuriates him so much that he takes a job as the head of advertising with Dow Chemical. In light of Ken's new position, Roger and Pete attempt to mend fences with him, especially when SC&P seeks to retain some autonomy from McCann-Erickson by proposing to move operations to Los Angeles. Instead of becoming a writer, Ken sees an opportunity to get revenge on them. Rather than drop SC&P as Dow's agency, he informs them he will retain them but make their life difficult. He is able to jerk them around to a limited extent, most notably when he shoots down Don's desperate plan to take SC&P private again (though he makes it clear he is not angry at Don, and is refusing in hopes it will make things worse for Pete) but after the McCann-Erickson takeover Dow is dropped as a client and Ken vanishes from the equation there. He is last seen in the final episode having lunch with Joan (proposing an opportunity for her to coordinate a promotional film for Dow), confident in his new position, and glad to be no longer with his former company.

=== Harry Crane ===
Harry Crane
- Rich Sommer as Harry Crane
- First appearance: "Smoke Gets in Your Eyes" (1.01)
- Last appearance: "Person to Person" (7.14)
- Created by: Matthew Weiner
- Portrayed by: Rich Sommer

In-universe information
- Full name: Harold Crane
- Nickname: Harry
- Occupation: Head of television department
- Spouse: Jennifer Crane (wife)
- Children: Beatrice Crane (daughter); Nathan Crane (son); Steven Crane (son)

Harold "Harry" Crane (Rich Sommer) was a media buyer at Sterling Cooper. He initially is part of the group of young and unmarried or newly married members of the Creative and Accounts teams. Harry is from Wisconsin and a University of Wisconsin alumnus, the only one of Pete's close friends who did not attend an Ivy League school (Ken went to Columbia, Pete to Dartmouth, and Paul to Princeton). He is married to Jennifer, who works at the phone company. In early seasons, they seem to have one of the happier and more egalitarian marriages on the show; Harry is honest with his wife and is shown asking her advice about his problems at work. He flirts with women but is faithful to his wife until he has too much to drink at an office party and has a one-night stand with Hildy, Pete's secretary. He confesses the infidelity to Jennifer, who kicks him out of their home for a time. Harry and Jennifer appear to have resolved that issue by Season 2, and they have a daughter named Beatrice. In Season 6 it is mentioned that they also now have twin sons, Nathan and Steven.

Harry is initially a bit of a pushover, accepting far less in pay in negotiations than he could have asked for, and his non-confrontational attitude causes him to mishandle a situation that leads to the firing of his friend and co-worker, Sal Romano. Despite these flaws, Harry is the only member of the firm to recognize the importance of television to the firm, and he subsequently creates and puts himself in charge of Sterling Cooper's television department. Later, when Sterling Cooper is in the process of being sold, Harry mistakenly thinks they are considering opening a West Coast office and believes he will be the person to move to California.

In Season 3, he is the only Sterling Cooper executive who is promoted by the firm's British owner as part of a short-lived company reorganization. Harry later accepts an offer to join Sterling Cooper Draper Pryce as "Head of Media". By Season 4, a more confident and slimmer, if smarmier, Harry shows great progress at work, as he is often seen making deals with television networks on the new agency's behalf. We see him flirting with Peggy's friends as well, and it is implied that he cheats on his wife but has learned to keep it from her. In typical awkward Harry fashion, he sees prostitutes while in California for work, but attempts to pay them in traveler's checks. When Harry calls Joey Baird into his office and tells him that he has a particular look suited to television, Baird interprets it as a homosexual advance and becomes wary of him.

During the Season 5 premiere, Megan mentions to Peggy that Don really dislikes Harry, and thus would not want him to attend his birthday party. Nonetheless, Harry is invited and attends. Given his mild social awkwardness, he is seemingly unaware of Don's opinion of him. The next day at the office, Megan catches Harry making lewd comments about her performance of "Zou Bisou Bisou" and he is briefly concerned that he could lose his job. Also in Season 5, he is approached by former close friend Paul Kinsey, who is now a Hare Krishna and is floundering. He has sex with Paul's Hare Krishna girlfriend without Paul's knowledge. Immediately afterwards, she tells Harry that he disgusts her and she only had sex with him so that he would no longer try to rescue Paul from the Krishnas. Indeed, later, Paul, wanting to escape the Krishnas, approaches Harry for help; he has written a spec script for Star Trek and wants to know if it will be successful. Harry reads the script, which he feels is terrible and borderline racist, but tells Paul the script is great. He urges him to leave immediately for California, giving him $500 (nearly $4000 in 2016 dollars) and a first class plane ticket on American Airlines for the trip. Paul expresses gratitude and feels Harry is a true friend.

In Season 6, Harry's personality has changed considerably from his days at Sterling Cooper; he has become arrogant and full of prideful boasting about the Media Department. His jealousy manifests itself when Joan fires his secretary, Scarlett, for falsifying her time card. He orders Scarlett back to work and then bursts into a partners' meeting, displaying considerable anger over the fact that Joan was promoted to partner when he had been passed over several times, particularly as his accomplishments happened "in broad daylight." Bert and Roger later give him a generous commission on "Broadway Joe on Broadway", a last-minute musical special he created to improve Dow Chemical's image, but flatly reject his demand to become a partner, Bert observing that Harry's outspoken criticism of their decision is the only genuinely impressive thing he has ever done. Don and Roger both despise Harry. Following the assassination of Martin Luther King Jr., Pete is outraged by Harry's fretting over the ad time lost to news coverage, which leads to a brief but intense shouting match in which Pete accuses Harry of being a racist. Harry takes it as a given that he will soon be made partner. Bert, during the meeting of Harry's outburst, assures Joan that will never happen.

During Season 7, Jim Cutler takes a dualistic view of Harry: on the one hand he says that Harry's TV work is hugely successful and will be a major part of SC&P in the future, but he also bluntly tells Harry "you may be the most dishonest man I have ever worked with." Jim decides that Harry should finally be offered a partnership and the senior partners agree, though Joan and Roger are outspoken in their opposition. Harry is surprised to run into Don when they both end up at a Los Angeles party for one of Megan's actress friends. The two men are uncomfortable at the event and go to a bar, where Harry says he wishes Don was back before stating that Jim and Lou Avery are planning a major cigarette-company account bid because that will allow them to get rid of Don; Don uses this information when he crashes the meeting and ultimately ruins the account bid. In "Waterloo", Harry has not yet signed his approved partnership deal because he is getting divorced and does not want Jennifer to end up with any of it. Roger tells him that he "missed the boat" and that the idea of his becoming partner is now off the table. Harry has once again failed to read a situation properly, and his boastful posturing thus results in him losing an enormous amount of money when McCann Erickson buys Sterling Cooper, where even the 5% stake Joan had is worth at least $1,500,000. Later, Megan contacts Harry to see if he can help her with her acting career. Harry just assumes this means she will have sex with him in exchange. When she refuses and leaves in disgust, he quickly goes to see Don, who is unaware of the proposition, to assure him that his soon-to-be-ex-wife Megan is "crazy" and Don should not believe anything she says. By the series finale, Harry is last seen wearing a fur coat and eating cookies as he awaits a final lunch with Pete and Peggy.

Sommer reprised the role in the 2018 film A Futile and Stupid Gesture, where Harry can be seen in the background of one scene.

=== Rachel Menken ===
Rachel Menken
- First appearance: "Smoke Gets in Your Eyes" (1.01)
- Last appearance: "Severance" (7.08)
- Created by: Matthew Weiner
- Portrayed by: Maggie Siff

In-universe information
- Family: Abraham Menken (father); Barbara Menken (older sister)
- Spouse: Tilden Katz (husband)
- Romances: Don Draper

Rachel Katz (née Menken; Maggie Siff) is the Jewish head of a department store who becomes romantically involved with Draper after she comes to Sterling Cooper in search of an advertising agency to revamp her business' image. Don's first encounter with Rachel, in the pilot, is at a meeting where he pitches the idea of using coupons to attract more customers to the store. Rachel disagrees with the tactic, asserting that she would like to attract wealthier customers. Draper is unhappy with hearing a woman talk to him assertively at the business table. He storms out of the meeting, but Roger Sterling later asks him to reconcile with Rachel, as she is worth $3 million. At his dinner with Rachel, Don questions her desire to work in business, confused that she would choose the "stress" of work over the comforts of married life. Rachel confidently replies that business is a thrill and adds that she has never been in love. Don mocks this addition, asserting that love does not exist; it was invented by ad men. He goes on to say that everyone is essentially alone – that people live alone and die alone. Rachel responds that she knows what it is like to be disconnected and feel out of place, and she sees that in Don. Something about the statement seems to intrigue Don, but Rachel ends the meeting, promising to come back to Sterling Cooper for another meeting on Monday morning.

At the second meeting, in the third episode, Rachel is irked that none of the admen on her team have been to her store. Don solves the problem by meeting her there that afternoon. While there she gives him a pair of medieval knight cuff links and takes him to her favorite place in the store, the roof - where the store keeps its patrol dogs. Rachel explains that she was always close to the dogs as a young girl because her father liked to work a lot. Other than her sister, the dogs were her only companions, as her mother died while giving birth to her. After her revelation, Don kisses her. He tells her he is married, which stuns her. She feels foolish and asks that he put someone else on her account at the firm.

It is later shown that Paul Kinsey replaced Don on the Menken's account when Rachel exchanges brief pleasantries with Don while on her way to a meeting at Sterling Cooper. She appears to still be stung by their romantic encounter.

While doing research for a campaign for the Israeli Tourist Board, Don invites Rachel to lunch so he can pick her brain about Jewish cultural identity. Afterward Rachel calls her sister and admits to feeling a strong connection to Don, but acknowledges a future with him is probably impossible.

When Roger has a heart attack, Don goes to Rachel's apartment and asks to come in; he has been highly affected by Roger's condition. She keeps her distance, while trying to console him. Don tries to kiss her, telling her she knows everything about him. She stops him and urges him to go to his wife. At this point Don kisses her again, saying, "This is it. This is all there is." She consents, and they have sex. Afterward, he confides in her that his mother was a prostitute who died giving birth to him. Don and Rachel continue their affair for several weeks.

When Pete Campbell blackmails Don, he comes to Rachel with the suggestion that they run away together to Los Angeles. She reminds him of his duty to his children and questions whether he would want to abandon his children after having grown up without a father. When Don persists, Rachel realizes he has not thought through this decision and tells him that he does not want to run away with her; he just wants to run away. She calls him a coward and ends their affair. Cooper later mentions that she went on an extended "ocean cruise," presumably to heal from her affair with Don.

Don encounters her again in Season 2, while he is dining out with Bobbie Barrett. Rachel introduces them to her husband, Tilden Katz. Though it appears that Don is only momentarily shaken by the news of Rachel's marriage, four episodes later, after drinking heavily with Roger and Freddy Rumsen, he gives his name as "Tilden Katz" to a bouncer outside an underground club Roger is trying to get them into, showing that Rachel was clearly still on his mind.

In Season 7, Don has a vision of Rachel attending a casting call for aspiring models. When he tries to contact her, Don discovers that Rachel had died the previous week. During a shiva conducted in her memory, Don learns that Rachel suffered from leukemia and that she had two children. Her sister, with whom Rachel was close and in whom she confided about her relationship with Don, is not happy to see him. She pointedly says that Rachel "had it all,” makes it clear her life was better for not having Don in it, and is curt until Don takes the hint and leaves.

=== Sally Draper ===
Sally Draper
- First appearance: "Smoke Gets in Your Eyes" (1.01)
- Last appearance: "Person to Person" (7.14)
- Created by: Matthew Weiner
- Portrayed by: Kiernan Shipka

In-universe information
- Full name: Sally Beth Draper
- Family: Don Draper (father); Betty Draper (mother); Bobby Draper (brother); Gene Draper (brother)
- Romances: Glen Bishop (ex-boyfriend)

Sally Beth Draper (Kiernan Shipka) is Don and Betty Draper's oldest child. The series' third episode, "Marriage of Figaro," depicts a party for her 6th birthday in May 1960. She becomes a more central character in the Seasons 3 and 4 (according to the time line of the series, she would turn nine years old in season 3 and 11 in season 4); from Season 4, she is promoted to a starring role. The death of her grandfather, Gene Hofstadt, affected Sally significantly and deepened the rift between her and her mother. When her youngest brother is named after their dead grandfather and given his room, Sally becomes convinced that the baby is her grandfather's reincarnation and becomes terrified of him, but is eventually calmed down by her father. Sally is adventurous, and she has been seen throughout the series making cocktails for her father, smoking one of her mother's cigarettes, asking Don's co-workers about sex, sneaking sips of their alcoholic beverages, being taught how to drive by her grandfather, and masturbating while at a friend's house. Her behavioral problems lead Betty to have her see a child psychiatrist in Season 4. Sally appears to be closer to her father than her mother, and in the Season 4 episode "The Beautiful Girls", she unexpectedly shows up at Don's office, because she wants to live with him instead of Betty and Henry Francis. Don sometimes affectionately calls Sally "Salamander." She develops a friendship with slightly older neighbor boy Glen, who is about 12 or 13, in Season 4. This infuriates Betty because, in prior years, Betty and Glen reached out and comforted each other when they were both feeling sad, lonely, and neglected. Betty forbids Sally to see Glen, and proves to be very volatile whenever Sally sees him. Sally continues to surreptitiously communicate with Glen, calling him frequently at his boarding school.

As Sally progresses into young adulthood, she witnesses several disturbing events, such as in the Season 5 episode "At the Codfish Ball" when she sees Marie Calvet, her stepmother Megan's mother, fellating Roger Sterling during a business dinner, and, most disturbingly, her own father having sex with his neighbor Sylvia in the Season 6 episode "Favors". Don's outright denial of the reality of the encounter alienates him from Sally, and, resentful of her parents, Sally decides to attend boarding school. While at school, Sally becomes a troublemaker, smoking constantly, sneaking alcohol onto campus, and dueling with golf clubs with her friends. By the end of the sixth season, Don decides to be more honest with his children, starting with showing them the now dilapidated whorehouse where he grew up. The choice to be truthful makes an impact on Sally and she begins to forgive her father for his transgressions by the beginning of Season 7. In the Season 7 episode, "A Day's Work" Sally goes to a dorm mate's mother's funeral, but ditches with her friends to go shopping. However, while at a café, she leaves her purse behind. Realizing this on the train back, she has no choice but to go to Don's work and ask him for a ride. She goes to his work to discover Lou Avery in what used to be his office. Now suspicious, Sally goes back to his apartment. Eventually, Don arrives and she he uses the excuse "I wasn't feeling well." He writes her a note and drives her back to the school. Mid-way, they confront each other about their lies. They stop for food and he drives her back to the school. Sally gets out of the car and while she shuts the door, she says, "Happy Valentines Day. I love you." However, she still objects to Don's decisions in life, telling her father that she does not want to be anything like her parents. "You're a very beautiful girl," Don responds. "It's up to you to be more than that."

When the series begins to draw to a close, Sally faces further complications of growing up. Glen decides to join the army and fight in Vietnam, causing a frustrated Sally to yell at Glen and express disdain over the possibility of his killing of innocent children and bystanders. Sally later expresses regret over her outburst and, through tears, tells Glen's mother that she is sorry and wants to say goodbye to Glen before he leaves for basic training. Later in 1970, Sally (now approximately 16) learns from Henry that her mother Betty is dying from lung cancer, something Betty had not wanted Sally to know at that stage of her illness. On a surprise visit to the Francis household, Betty gives Sally a letter that she tells Sally to read after her death. Shortly afterward, at her dorm room, Sally goes against orders and reads the letter anyway. In the letter, Betty gives Sally a picture of Betty to show the embalmers how to dress and style her for the viewing, and tells Sally that she loves her, and that while in the past she was worried because Sally always wanted to go her own way, now she admires her independent nature, resulting in Sally breaking down in tears. Later, upon learning Betty wants to send Bobby and Gene to stay with her uncle after her death, Sally decides to cancel her planned trip to Madrid and serve as a maternal figure to her brothers. It is also implied that she will press for Henry to raise the boys after Betty's death, since she tells Don they should not be uprooted. The final image of Sally is of her washing dishes while Betty smokes at the kitchen table.

=== Bert Cooper ===
Bert Cooper
- First appearance: "Ladies Room" (1.02)
- Last appearance: "Waterloo" (7.07)
- Created by: Matthew Weiner
- Portrayed by: Robert Morse

In-universe information
- Full name: Bertram Cooper
- Nickname: Bert
- Occupation: Senior Partner
- Family: Alice Cooper (older sister)

Bertram "Bert" Cooper (Robert Morse) is the senior partner of Sterling Cooper Advertising Agency at beginning of the series. Although portrayed as elderly and eccentric, he can be a ruthless businessman and is a keen operator behind the scenes with many connections in New York high society.

Cooper came up through the advertising industry as a media buyer and founded Sterling Cooper with Roger Sterling's late father, Roger Sterling Sr., in 1923. At times, he acts as a surrogate father to Sterling, providing advice and remembering him as a child. Considering Sterling Cooper his life's work, he was hesitant to sell the majority interest in the agency in 1962 to the British advertising agency Putnam Powell, & Lowe (PPL). After the sale, he begins to feel increasingly insignificant as they start to exert control, but accepts this as part of the terms of the buyout, from which he, his sister Alice, Roger, and Don profited handsomely. When informed of the potential sale PPL and Sterling Cooper to McCann Erickson and that he will be forced to retire as a result, Cooper goes on to start a new agency, Sterling Cooper Draper Pryce in December 1963.

Cooper is the second character at Sterling Cooper to learn that Don Draper is actually Dick Whitman, after Pete Campbell informs him of the truth, but he reacts with nonchalance, remarking, "Mr. Campbell, who cares?" and urging him to forget about it. In a ruthless move he keeps silent about Don's identity but uses this knowledge two years later in the Season 3 episode "Seven Twenty Three" to pressure Don into signing a three-year contract with the agency.

In Season 4 in the new office at the Time Life Building, Cooper does not have an office and can be seen lounging around the office's sitting areas reading the newspaper and working on crossword puzzles with his long-time secretary, Ida Blankenship. Later in the Season 4 episode "Blowing Smoke", when the agency is forced to radically downsize its staff following the loss of the Lucky Strike account, an angered Cooper tells the other partners he is quitting, partially in response to Don Draper's ad in The New York Times, which he feels is a needlessly reckless career move, and he does not want to be associated with Draper's "stunt". However, as of the premiere of Season 5, he is back with the agency.

By Season 6, Cooper has been given his own office on SCDP's new second floor and starts going about his duties with more vigor and enjoyment than he has for the past two seasons, and more effectively than Roger and Don, the other senior partners. Cooper works in secret with Pete and Joan to prepare SCDP for becoming a publicly traded company, but his plans are derailed when Don loses the Jaguar account. Cooper's initial opinion on the subsequent merger with CGC is unclear, though he goes about his duties at the new agency with his usual aplomb. Cooper later volunteers to have his name removed from the company's along with those of the recently deceased partners, but gleefully accepts Cutler's proposal to name the firm "Sterling Cooper & Partners." On Thanksgiving Day, 1968, Cooper leads Roger, Jim and Joan in confronting Don over his recent behavior and placing the errant creative director on an indefinite leave of absence.

In Season 7, after Roger's urging, Cooper is willing to let Don return to the agency under strict stipulations. He dies while watching the 1969 Apollo 11 Moon landing on television with his maid. At the end of the first half of Season 7, Bert appears to Don as an apparition in the SC&P lobby, and goes into a song and dance of "The Best Things in Life Are Free", surrounded by smiling, dancing secretaries instead of showgirls, before disappearing. Later, during Season 7's "Lost Horizon", Cooper's ghost appears to Don in his car, chatting and giving him a bit of insight during a late-night drive.

Cooper's wife appears to have died between the first and second seasons; he wears a wedding ring only in the first season, and in Season 2 refers to the late Mrs. Cooper having introduced Roger Sterling to his first wife, Mona. Cooper is childless, possibly as a result of an unnecessary orchiectomy performed by Dr. Lyle Evans during the "height of his sexual prime". He has a sister, Alice Cooper, who was an early investor in Sterling Cooper and serves as a partner and Secretary-Treasurer. Cooper also describes his mother as a major influence on his life, saying that she made him who he is, although she did not live to see his eventual success.

Cooper's most notable characteristics are his eccentricities and being an aficionado of Japanese art and culture. His office is decorated in a Japanese motif with shoji dividers, the erotic illustration The Dream of the Fisherman's Wife, among other items such as a late period red painting by Mark Rothko. Also, inspired by Japanese customs, he requires visitors to remove their shoes before entering his office and also walks around the rest of the Sterling Cooper offices in his socks.

In contrast with many of his colleagues Cooper abstains from smoking and even lectures Roger about being dependent on smoking. He does not drink often, either, but will occasionally celebrate with a drink of brandy or elderflower liqueur.

He is a member of the Republican Party and a devotee of Ayn Rand. He gets Sterling Cooper involved with the 1960 Nixon campaign, providing advertising services to the campaign gratis. His conservative ideology can be seen to clash with some of the younger characters as the series progresses through the 1960s as he states, “Civil rights is a slippery slope to socialism.” and his support of the Vietnam War to contain communism in South East Asia. Cooper also seems to harbor some racist feelings, as evidenced in the Season 7 episode "A Day's Work" when, after, Joan has reassigned Dawn Chambers to the reception desk, Cooper complains that visitors to the agency are greeted by someone who is black. Cooper is more progressive when it comes to acceptance of Asian cultures due to his interest in Japan, admonishing Roger when he attempts to sabotage a client meeting with Honda due to his unresolved anger at Japan over World War II. He champions Joan becoming a partner in the agency and encourages her career growth. He is also accepting of his sister being in a same-sex relationship.

=== Lane Pryce ===
Lane Pryce (Jared Harris), previously employed at Puttnam, Powell and Lowe, becomes a junior partner at the Sterling Cooper Draper Pryce at the end of Season 3. Despite being a junior partner, his name is on the company's masthead. In the fifth season, after embezzling funds from the company, he forges a check and gets caught by Don, who tells him to resign. After typing a resignation letter, Lane commits suicide by hanging himself in his office.

=== Megan Draper ===
Megan Draper
- First appearance: "Christmas Comes But Once a Year" (4.02)
- Last appearance: "New Business" (7.09)
- Created by: Matthew Weiner
- Portrayed by: Jessica Paré

In-universe information
- Alias: Megan Calvet (maiden name)
- Occupation: Actress; Secretary
- Family: Emile Calvet (father); Marie Calvet (mother); Marie-France Calvet (older sister)
- Spouse: Don Draper (ex-husband)
- Children: Sally Draper (ex-stepdaughter); Bobby Draper (ex-stepson); Gene Draper (ex-stepson)

Megan Draper (née Calvet) (Jessica Paré) (born 1940/41) begins as a member of SCDP's typing pool, makes her first appearance at the beginning of Season 4, rises from receptionist to Don Draper's secretary, and ultimately marries Draper by the beginning of Season 5. Following Miss Blankenship's sudden death, Megan is promoted from the main reception desk to take over as Draper's personal secretary.

In the Season 4 episode "Chinese Wall", she indicates to Don an interest in advertising, and one night, while discussing work, Megan initiates a sexual encounter with Don on his office couch. She comments that she would not run out crying the next day if they slept together, presumably a reference to Don's previous secretary, Allison, who left SCDP in tears following Don's cold treatment of her after their one-night stand.

In the Season 4 finale, Don hires Megan to babysit his children on a trip to California, when his planned childcare falls through at the last moment. Although Don has been dating Faye Miller, SCDP's marketing research consultant, for months, he proposes marriage to Megan upon returning from the California trip, and she accepts. Don promotes her to copywriter soon after their engagement announcement at SCDP. Before their marriage, Don appears to have fully disclosed his personal secrets to Megan, as she is aware of his former identity and Dick Whitman's birth date, and knows about Anna.

Megan, originally from Montreal, is bilingual in English and French. She is intelligent and capable, but moody and combative as well; as her own mother tells her, she has the "artistic temperament". She originally wanted to be an actress, and in Season 5, she quits her copywriting job at SCDP to pursue acting again, which causes tension with Don, who had enjoyed working with his wife and sees this as a sign of her distaste for his profession. Megan struggles to find work for months, and eventually becomes frustrated and depressed. She finally asks Don's help to get a job in a commercial for Butler Shoes in the Season 5 finale. She is 26 at the time of her marriage to Don, who turns 40 seven months after the wedding.

By Season 6, Megan has landed a regular role in a daytime soap opera on ABC titled To Have and to Hold and is famous enough to be occasionally recognized. She admits to Sylvia Rosen that she had become pregnant while in Hawaii with Don and was relieved when she miscarried, as she had contemplated her options, as a pregnancy would have disrupted her emerging acting career. Megan later reveals this to Don, and he later has a drug-induced fantasy of her pregnant.

Don and Megan become distant throughout season 6. Don disapproves of Megan kissing another actor in a scene, which causes conflict, and Megan is unaware that Don is having an affair with their married neighbor, Sylvia Rosen. After Sylvia ends things with Don, he becomes obsessed with her and barely communicates with Megan. Marie suggests Megan dress less like a wife for a business dinner Don has invited Megan to, which attracts Don's amorous attention that night, but he soon becomes detached again and Megan tells him things must change.

In the Season 6 finale, Don is arrested for drunkenly punching a minister and finally acknowledges to Megan that he is unhappy in New York. He suggests they start anew in California, and Megan is excited by the prospect and happy that Don is willing to fight for their marriage. She quits her soap opera job, eagerly anticipating pursuing acting opportunities on the West Coast. However, later that same day, an unanticipated work crisis forces Don to tell her they are not moving. Angered that she has derailed her career for nothing, Megan wonders aloud why they are fighting for their marriage anymore and storms out.

In between seasons, Megan moves to California without Don and has no idea he has been on forced leave from SCDP. When she discovers this, she suggests he would rather stay at home and brood than be with her. It is also implied that Megan's own career is not going well; she is having difficulty securing roles, and at one point, she bombs an audition and then tracks down the director to tearfully demand a second chance.

When Don's pregnant niece Stephanie calls him from California asking for help, he sends her to Megan's house and makes plans to fly out the next day. While Megan is friendly and hospitable to Stephanie at first, she quickly becomes jealous and uncomfortable and gives Stephanie $1000 so that she will leave before Don arrives. She tells Don that Stephanie chose to leave, and at a party that night initiates a threesome with him and one of her actress friends.

In the season 7 episode "Waterloo," Don, who is facing being fired from the firm, calls Megan and suggests he might finally move to Los Angeles, but Megan tells him not to and they acknowledge that their marriage is over. Months later, in the Season 7 episode "New Business", they have an unpleasant final meeting, where they sign divorce papers, and Don offers Megan a check for $1 million. Bitter and angry, Megan berates Don for "ruining her life" and calls him "an aging, sloppy, selfish liar," but accepts the money regardless. She returns to the apartment she once shared with Don and discovers her mother with Roger Sterling. Though Megan is shocked and angry at first, she later tells her sister that their mother was unhappy for a very long time and observes "at least she did something about it." Marie eventually marries Roger, making him Megan's stepfather.

=== Henry Francis ===
Henry Francis
- First appearance: "My Old Kentucky Home" (3.03)
- Last appearance: "The Milk and Honey Route" (7.13)
- Created by: Matthew Weiner
- Portrayed by: Christopher Stanley

In-universe information
- Occupation: Director of Public Relations and Research for the Governor of New York
- Family: Pauline Francis (mother); Eleanor Francis (daughter)
- Spouse: Betty Draper (wife)

Henry Francis (Christopher Stanley) is a Republican political advisor who serves as the Director of Public Relations and Research in the Governor's Office under New York Governor Nelson Rockefeller and, later, is an advisor to New York City Mayor John Lindsay. He first sees Betty when she is six months pregnant at the Sterlings' Kentucky Derby party, and is instantly drawn to her. Later, Betty uses a political pretext to call him to ask if he can use his influence to save a local reservoir, and they quickly develop a deeper connection. Betty reciprocates Henry's attention because she increasingly feels no connection with Don due to his non-stop infidelities, lies over his true identity, and his sometimes verbally abusive attitude towards her. After Betty's beloved father dies, the much older Henry, who was previously married and has adult children not much younger than Betty, also serves as a father figure for her. Henry and Betty have only a few brief and furtive meetings before Henry proposes marriage in the wake of the Kennedy assassination. Season 3 ends with the two of them on a plane with baby Gene, flying to Reno so Betty can obtain a quick divorce from Don. At the start of Season 4, we see that Henry and Betty have married and Henry has rather uncomfortably taken up residence in the Drapers' house, living with Betty and her three children and initially paying no rent to Don. He tries to soothe Betty as she continues to react angrily to Don and his irresponsibility towards the children, but he becomes more frustrated with her.

Betty does not feel accepted by Henry's family, especially when she is unable to control Sally during a family visit to the home of Henry's mother Pauline, and in the face of Pauline's not-so-veiled scorn. During this time, Henry is concerned by Betty's continued anger towards Don, and he wonders aloud if they rushed into their marriage too quickly. At the end of Season 4, Henry and Betty decide to move to Rye, NY. By Season 5, Betty has gained a large amount of weight, but Henry tells her she is beautiful. Her relationship with Henry seems affectionate and Henry seems to love her unconditionally. In the Season 6 premiere, when Betty dyes her hair black, to her children's dismay, Henry says she looks like Elizabeth Taylor. Betty supports, and seems rejuvenated by, Henry's decision to run for office in Season 6, and after he admiringly tells the overweight, brunette Betty that during his campaign people will "really see" her, she rapidly regains her former svelte figure and blonde hairdo. Henry is a solid, mature, and responsible presence in her life, but he also has very traditional views of women, and they have an argument when Betty, at a political fundraiser, does not parrot Henry's political position.

During the final season, Henry takes Betty's diagnosis of terminal lung cancer very hard, and in typical fashion is full of energy to fight it. Betty refuses to do so, just as she refuses to quit smoking or to quit her plans of studying psychology at a university as long as she is physically able. Against her wishes, Henry drives up to see Sally at school to tell her about the diagnosis and to ask her to help him to convince her mother to do chemotherapy. As he talks to Sally, he breaks down crying. As her illness progresses, Betty makes it known that her wish is for Sally, Bobby and Gene to be raised by her brother (William) and his wife (Judy) after her death, rather than by Henry or Don, although Sally feels that Henry is the best person to look after her little brothers.

=== Stan Rizzo ===
Stan Rizzo
- First appearance: "Waldorf Stories" (4.06)
- Last appearance: "Person to Person" (7.14)
- Created by: Matthew Weiner
- Portrayed by: Jay R. Ferguson

In-universe information
- Occupation: Art Director (seasons 3–7)
- Family: Robbie Rizzo (deceased cousin)
- Romances: Peggy Olson

Stan Rizzo (Jay R. Ferguson) becomes the art director at Sterling Cooper Draper Pryce after Salvatore is fired. Before coming to the company, he worked at DDB, making unaired work for Lyndon B. Johnson's 1964 presidential campaign. In the beginning of his tenure, he and Peggy are often at odds with each other due to his abrasive and sometimes macho attitude, but the two develop a strong working relationship after Stan tries to intimidate Peggy by suggesting they work in the nude; Peggy calls his bluff and strips down, prompting Stan to concede victory to her. Stan is one of the few members of the SCDP creative department who survives the staff cuts.

By Season 5 the two are working well together, until the firm hires Michael Ginsberg, whose bombastic and somewhat sexist attitude is more in line with Stan's than Peggy's.

In Season 6, Stan begins to embrace the counterculture of the late 60s-early 70s, growing out his hair and regularly using drugs. After Peggy leaves to join CGC, she and Stan maintain their friendship through late-night phone calls. Peggy's boss Ted Chaough overhears one such conversation, and Peggy relates Stan's news that Heinz ketchup is considering meetings; Chaough takes advantage of this and pressures Peggy to pitch a CGC campaign. Although neither firm ultimately wins the account, a betrayed Stan gives Peggy the finger at a bar. After SCDP and CGC merge into SC&P, Stan and Peggy easily rebuild their friendship, and he is happy to be working with her again. In "The Crash", Stan is one of several employees injected with a stimulant by Jim Cutler's "Dr. Feelgood" to boost creativity and spends an entire weekend intoxicated. During this time, he comes on to Peggy, who gently rejects him, and to whom reveals that his first cousin recently died in Vietnam. Peggy counsels him that loss cannot be dealt with by getting high and having sex. While Stan initially takes her advice, he is later discovered in flagrante delicto with Wendy Gleason, the hippie daughter of a recently deceased partner.

Several episodes later in "Favors", Peggy telephones Stan in the middle of the night, waking him up, to plead for his assistance with a rat in her apartment. When he refuses, she teasingly offers to "make it worth his while," but he still refuses, as he is currently in bed with a nude sleeping woman.

In the Season 6 finale "In Care Of", SC&P have landed the California-based Sunkist. Stan approaches Don, requesting permission to go to California and start a fledgling branch of the firm. Don warns him that it would basically mean demotion and work on only one account, but Stan is adamant. Don is inspired by the idea, and instead of allowing Stan to go, proposes to the partners that he himself go to start the branch. Stan is infuriated by what he perceives as a betrayal on Don's part, although Don offers to let Stan come to California in a few months. Don later decides against going, and instead Pete Campbell and Ted Chaough go, without Stan.

During the final episode, after SCDP has been absorbed back into McCann, Stan and Peggy acknowledge their hitherto unspoken feelings for one-another, and Stan urges Peggy not to pursue Joan's offer to join her new agency, but rather remain at McCann with him. The final image of him is sharing an embrace with Peggy during a late evening working.

=== Ted Chaough ===
Ted Chaough
- First appearance: "The Chrysanthemum and the Sword" (4.05)
- Last appearance: "Lost Horizon" (7.12)
- Created by: Matthew Weiner
- Portrayed by: Kevin Rahm

In-universe information
- Occupation: Sterling Cooper & Partners Partner; Cutler, Gleason, and Chaough Partner (Former)
- Spouse: Nan Chaough (wife)

Ted Chaough (Kevin Rahm) is a self-proclaimed rival of Don Draper's in the advertising world. His agency, Cutler, Gleason, and Chaough (CGC), picks up Don's resigned accounts Clearasil and Belle Jolie, and is competing with Sterling Cooper Draper Pryce (SCDP) for an account with Honda in Season 4. Don tricks Ted into making an expensive presentation to Honda executives, which backfires on Ted as he violates Honda's presentation rules of no finished work or commercials. Though the two agencies are comparable in size, Chaough seems obsessed with competing against Don, behaving in a magnanimous and jesting manner whenever Don crosses Ted's path. Ted tries to woo Pete Campbell over to his agency, but Pete remains loyal to Don. After Don writes a New York Times ad proclaiming that SCDP will be dropping business with cigarette companies for moral reasons, Ted makes a prank call to Don pretending to be Robert F. Kennedy. In Season 5, Ted recruits Peggy to leave SCDP and join his advertising firm as chief copywriter for $1,000 a year more than she had asked for. This time, Ted remains confident but is much less obnoxious than in his previous appearances; he does not tell Peggy how jealous he is of Don, and he appreciates her talent more than Don ever had. She accepts his offer, which in the season finale has him assigning her a huge amount of material involving an account for cigarettes aimed at female consumers.

In Season 6, Peggy shares Stan's SCDP insider information with Ted, noting that the Heinz Ketchup executive had met surreptitiously with SCDP but there was friction between him and Heinz Beans executive Raymond Geiger, an SCDP client. Ted sees an opportunity and pressures Peggy to "find out everything you know about Heinz Ketchup." In "To Have and To Hold", Chaough's team encounters Don's in the hallway in front of the room where firms are making their Heinz pitches, and Don is shocked to see Peggy there. In the end, Heinz chooses a third (larger) firm, and Raymond Geiger drops SCDP because he feels betrayed.

In "For Immediate Release," Ted kisses Peggy after learning Frank Gleason, one of CCG's partners, has cancer. Ted and Don commiserate at a bar over their very low chances of winning the Chevy account, primarily due to the small size of their respective firms. Don spontaneously comes up with, and pitches to Ted, the idea that they should combine their firms so as to have a shot at competing with the major ad agencies. Ted agrees, and the two firms merge, much to the surprise of everyone concerned.

Don decides to assert his authority by getting Ted drunk and letting him humiliate himself at a subsequent creatives meeting. Ted, however, gets his revenge by flying the two of them in his small plane to a Mohawk Airlines meeting despite the rainy, turbulent weather; Don is a visibly terrified passenger.

In "Man with a Plan", Ted's management style is shown to clash with Don's, as the personable Ted tries to involve everyone and get their input, while Don primarily values his own opinion. The two men also clash over Peggy, with Don trying to get his protégé to take his side, while Ted tries to woo Peggy to his.

Unhappy in his marriage, Ted meets with Peggy after the merger and expresses his interest in having a romantic relationship with her, but they agree that the relationship would be impossible given the circumstances. He also insists that because of his attraction to her, he must remain reserved in her presence. Despite this, their closeness and attraction to one another becomes apparent to everyone in the office, leading Don to embarrass Ted in front of a client to put a stop to it. From then on, Ted does what he can to ignore Peggy.

In the season 6 finale, Peggy ensures Ted sees her leaving early for a date in a provocative ensemble, and he camps out at her door until she returns. He professes his love for her, they sleep together, and he makes plans to leave his family for her. By morning, Ted has lost his resolve and pleads with Don to send him to California to work the new Sunkist account for SC&P so that he can stop himself from destroying his family. Don agrees, and Ted says goodbye to a devastated Peggy.

Ted spends the first part of Season 7 completely adrift in California, badly missing New York and mostly ignored as an impotent figurehead in an office where the work that is getting done is entirely due to Pete's efforts. He hits rock bottom when flying Sunkist executives to a meeting, briefly turning off the engine as he considers crashing the plane before changing his mind. He is not bothered by Sunkist's dismay, telling Jim Cutler, his partner from CGC, that he wants to be bought out of his SC&P partnership share, and he plans to vote for Jim's plan to fire Don over the nebulous breach of Don's contract. However, the combination of the huge windfall from Roger's McCann buyout offer and Don's pledge that Ted can come back East and simply do the hands-on work leads him to approve the sale. Ted is much happier being able to stick to creative work only and admits his feelings for Peggy were a mistake. Ted reveals to Don late in Season 7 that he has divorced his wife, who decided to remain in California, and begun dating his former college girlfriend.

Ted is last seen in the 12th episode of Season 7, "Lost Horizon". SC&P has been absorbed by McCann Erickson, and Ted and Don are attending a meeting for Miller Beer with at least a dozen other McCann Creative Directors. When Don wanders out in the middle of an important meeting, Ted smiles to himself.

=== Michael Ginsberg ===
Michael Ginsberg
- First appearance: "Tea Leaves" (5.03)
- Last appearance: "The Runaways" (7.05)
- Created by: Matthew Weiner
- Portrayed by: Ben Feldman

In-universe information
- Occupation: Copywriter
- Family: Morris Ginsberg (adoptive father)

Michael Ginsberg (Ben Feldman) first appears in the Season 5 episode "Tea Leaves" when he is hired as a part-time copywriter by Sterling Cooper Draper Pryce. He is initially hired to service the Mohawk Airlines account, and proves himself to be both prolific and innovative. He quickly becomes an essential part of the creative team and surpasses Peggy Olson midway through the season as the firm's most productive writer, when Peggy becomes mired in the Heinz account. Ginsberg is an idiosyncratic, socially awkward character who tends to speak his mind, which both helps and hinders him. His position at the firm is threatened at times, including at his interview, when Peggy decides not to employ him for fear of his being too extroverted and idiosyncratic for Don's tastes. However, this decision is reversed by Roger, who has already told Mohawk they have taken Ginsberg on.

The quality of Ginsberg's work is his main asset, and he tells Peggy immediately following his interview that although he can be tough to handle, he is a natural copywriter. His pitching style is theatrical, and he often captivates his clients with his over-the-top performances and youthful vigor. In this respect, he stands out from the rest of the SCDP team, particularly Don and Peggy, who are quieter and more understated both in their copy and their presentation. As the season goes on, Ginsberg's socially awkward, tone-deaf genius and refusal to follow orders begin to create resentment in both Don and Peggy, leading to a conflict between Ginsberg and Don in the Season 5 episode "Dark Shadows", when Don decides to submit his own work for an account instead of Ginsberg's. The episode reveals Ginsberg's competitive side, which had been rarely evident until then.

Ginsberg is Jewish, and he lives with his adoptive father Morris in Brooklyn. In "Far Away Places", he reveals to Peggy that he was told he was born in a concentration camp during World War II, and that his father found him in a Swedish orphanage at age 5. He also claims to be a Martian who is waiting for orders from above, telling this to Peggy. Ginsberg appears to have a difficult relationship with his father, who is overbearing and physically dominates him.

Roger takes a liking to Ginsberg when he discovers they share a common desire to throw something out of their skyscraper windows, and Roger thereafter canvasses Ginsberg's support to help him with the Manischewitz account, which he is trying to bring to SCDP. With Megan's departure from SCDP in "Lady Lazarus", Ginsberg's position as copywriter is further elevated, and he becomes one of the two full-time copywriters at the firm, both of whom report to Don. However, in the season finale "The Phantom", Ginsberg and Stan struggle to make the same impression on clients that Peggy did, and Don does not back their ideas the way he did hers, frustrating them.

In Season 6, Ginsberg is shown to have embraced more of the counterculture, and grows a thick moustache while dressing less formally. With the merger of SCDP and CGC, Peggy once again becomes his superior. His politics come to a head when, during an argument with partner Jim Cutler, Ginsberg denounces Dow Chemical for the use of its Napalm in Vietnam. Cutler angrily criticizes Ginsberg as a hypocrite for abhorring Dow's policies and yet accepting paychecks from them.

Ginsberg's father later sets him up on a blind date, but he immediately botches it through being socially awkward and admitting that he is still a virgin. His behavior and manners continue to be erratic and begin to deteriorate throughout the season, culminating in a psychotic breakdown brought on by the installation of an IBM computer in the old creative breakroom in "The Runaways". After the computer is installed at SC&P, Ginsberg becomes convinced that the computer has a plan to destroy the human race, and that it is doing so by turning those within its proximity into homosexuals thereby eradicating the possibility of female fertilization. Convinced that this is true, he arrives at Peggy's apartment to escape from it in order to do his work, but later wakes Peggy in order to "reproduce" and therefore beat the machine. The next day he gives Peggy his severed nipple as an apology, explaining that since his nipple is a valve and he has now removed it, the computer's vibrations can now flow through him and he will not need to use Peggy as an outlet. Ginsberg is removed from the building tied to a stretcher, leaving Peggy in tears and Stan in shock. It is later mentioned that Ginsberg's father had him institutionalized.

Feldman expressed surprise upon learning of the final story arc, stating "my jaw just dropped to the floor". Feldman ultimately kept the severed nipple prop.

=== Bobby Draper ===
Bobby Draper
- First appearance: "Smoke Gets in Your Eyes" (1.01)
- Last appearance: "The Runaways" (7.05)
- Created by: Matthew Weiner
- Portrayed by: Maxwell Huckabee (seasons 1); Aaron Hart (seasons 1–2); Jared S. Gilmore (seasons 3–4); Mason Vale Cotton (seasons 5–7)

In-universe information
- Full name: Robert Draper
- Nickname: Bobby
- Family: Don Draper (father); Betty Draper (mother); Sally Draper (older sister); Gene Draper (younger brother)

Robert "Bobby" Draper (Maxwell Huckabee in season 1; Aaron Hart in seasons 1 and 2; Jared S. Gilmore in seasons 3 and 4; and Mason Vale Cotton in seasons 5, 6 and 7) is Don and Betty Draper's middle child. His mother referred to him as a "little liar." Bobby was mentioned as being 5 years old in the Season 2 episode "The Mountain King," and 7 years old in the Season 4 episode "The Chrysanthemum and the Sword", making his birthday between March and September 1957. Due to many of the Draper story lines focusing on Don, Betty and Sally, Bobby does not have much of a role in the early seasons. He is depicted as being clumsy and accident-prone, such as burning his lip on a hot stove. When Betty urges Don to spank Bobby for damaging the radio, he opts to scold the boy rather than resorting to physical punishment; he later reveals that he is reluctant to use corporal punishment on Bobby because his own father beat him badly very often, and the only thing it accomplished was Don spending time thinking of ways to murder his father. After the Drapers divorce, Bobby gradually becomes close to his stepfather, Henry Francis, and he is treated kindly by Don's new wife, Megan. During Season 6, Bobby's character is expanded; he shown to be sympathetic towards black people in the aftermath of Martin Luther King, Jr's assassination, as well as expressing concern for Henry's safety. Don realizes that he has been missing out on his children's lives. By Season 7, Bobby is deeply troubled over Betty and Henry's arguments and fears they might divorce. He does not spend much time with his mother, but one day she agrees to help chaperone a field trip with his class. He is thrilled by his mother's involvement, but things sour when he trades his mother's sandwich for candy, which leads to her yelling at him and turning a cold shoulder to him for the rest of the day.

=== Lou Avery ===
Lou Avery
- First appearance: "For Immediate Release" (6.06)
- Last appearance: "The Strategy" (7.06)
- Created by: Matthew Weiner
- Portrayed by: Allan Havey

In-universe information
- Occupation: Creative Director

Lou Avery (Allan Havey) is first introduced in Season 6 as a creative executive at rival agency Dancer Fitzgerald Sample, competing with Don Draper and Roger Sterling for the Chevrolet account. When Don is placed on indefinite leave of absence from Sterling Cooper & Partners at the end of Season 6, Lou is brought in as a replacement creative director-for-hire on a two-year contract. As Don is exiting the SC&P offices after being told of his suspension, he runs into Lou and Duck Phillips; it is implied that Phillips coordinated the deal to bring Lou into SC&P in his role as a head hunter. In Season 7, it is shown that Lou brings a very different working method to SC&P: he is more interested in getting a large amount of creative work done on rigid deadlines and tight budgets. He is also not very creative or daring and is very old-fashioned. This causes tension with Peggy Olson, who is used to spending a lot of time on one pitch at a time until a creative breakthrough produces unique work, and Lou makes a point of ignoring Peggy's ideas, shunting aside her efforts, and treating her condescendingly. The members of the creative team under him do not respect him and he becomes an object of open ridicule when someone discovers that he writes and illustrates his own unpublished cartoon, Scout's Honor, full of hackneyed themes and unamusing punchlines. Lou later becomes upset when the partners allow Don to come back to work in the creative department and report to him, possibly recognizing how much better Don is at the job than he is. Lou finds Don's presence a distraction, and assigns Peggy as Don's direct supervisor. When he and Jim Cutler seek out a major cigarette deal (knowing that winning it would allow them to get rid of Don, due to his previous anti-tobacco ad in the New York Times), Lou is first angry when Don screws up the pitch meeting, then left ruined when they lose the cigarette deal anyway. Jim (who has no particular loyalty to Lou) makes it clear he does not care that Lou's background is in tobacco (which is now useless), that Lou is not important to the company, and that he regards Lou as essentially hired help. Not getting to share in the McCann payout windfall, Lou later emerges as the powerless director of the California office, where he openly ignores his work to keep trying to sell his planned "Scout's Honor" cartoon. He does sell the idea to a Japanese company and plans a move to Tokyo, and calls Don to taunt him about how happy he is to be living his dream; Don is first panicked, thinking Lou had the news about the McCann merger before him, but when he realizes the truth he just blankly and insincerely wishes Lou well as the call ends, Lou's response and last line on the show being "Enjoy the rest of your miserable life."

=== Bob Benson ===
Bob Benson
- First appearance: "The Doorway" (6.01)
- Last appearance: "The Strategy" (7.06)
- Created by: Matthew Weiner
- Portrayed by: James Wolk

In-universe information
- Occupation: Account Executive

Bob Benson (James Wolk) is a recurring character in season 6. A new hire in Accounts, he answers to Ken Cosgrove, although no one recalls having hired him. Bob's overly eager and helpful demeanor irritates many in the office and is interpreted as sycophantic by Don, Pete, and Ken. Bob engages in practices such as always buying an extra coffee so he has one to give to others, sending a catered deli platter to Roger's mother's wake, as well as hanging out on the lower floor of the office (Accounts is on the upper floor), looking for people to talk to, and in the reception area of Accounts, trying to be seen and (unsuccessfully) to appear busy. While at first these activities annoy people, eventually they bear fruit and gain Bob a stronger place in the firm. Bob is also shown listening to an LP audiobook of Frank Bettger's How I Raised Myself From Failure to Success in Selling (1949) and using similar language to inspire his friend, Michael Ginsberg.

In "Man with a Plan", Bob tactfully assists Joan when she is in pain due to an ovarian cyst and, displaying an ability to think quickly and a willingness to lie, tells the nurse that he strongly believes that Joan has just ingested poison, resulting in Joan's receiving treatment immediately after her abdominal pain alone had failed to result in any treatment. A grateful Joan prevents his lay-off after SCDP merges with CGC, and Bob is later seen accompanying Joan and Kevin to the beach.

Based on a comment made by Joan, Bob assists Pete Campbell in getting an experienced nurse for his now-ailing mother. Later, Benson intervenes in an argument between Michael Ginsberg and Jim Cutler, taking Cutler's side; his subsequent apology to Cutler leads Cutler to assign Bob to handle the Manischewitz account and give Bob a foot in the door with the Chevy business (although Bob is apparently unaware that this is part of Cutler's efforts to stage a coup within the merged firm).

When Pete voices concerns to Bob that the nurse Bob recommended, Manolo Colón, may be sexually abusing his mother and taking advantage of her dementia, Bob says Manolo does not date women and then hints heavily at his own romantic feelings for Pete, which Pete, repulsed, rejects.

When Ken is injured and the senior partners assign Bob to take the lead on the Chevy account, where he would potentially be working closely with Pete, an angered Pete threatens Bob and is astonished when Bob threatens him in turn. Bob is later shown venting in fluent Castilian Spanish on the phone to Manolo about Pete threatening Bob's future, saying it does not matter how nice Pete's mother is.

Pete proceeds to hire Duck Phillips to find Bob another job. Instead, Duck uncovers Bob's secret: much like Don Draper, Bob's adopted an assumed identity to compensate for an embarrassing and impoverished past. None of his college references check out, he is from a poor area of West Virginia, and he was the manservant of a vice president at Brown Brothers Harriman, rather than an employee of the firm itself in the accounts department, as he had implied. Moreover, his name is likely a false one. Pete immediately thinks to expose Bob, but, having learned from his experience trying to expose Don years earlier, decides to call a truce with Bob and lays out some ground rules to control Bob instead.

Bob appears shocked when Pete tells him Manolo (aka Marcos Constantine) apparently eloped with Pete's mother, and she has "fallen" overboard and become lost at sea under mysterious circumstances. Pete flatly rejects the idea that Bob was not in on the situation and proceeds to try and strong-arm him out of Chevy's good graces. Bob, maintaining his innocence in the Manolo situation, manipulates Pete into making a fool of himself at Chevy's headquarters, thereby securing his own position. Around the same time, Roger Sterling sees that Bob is spending time with Joan and giving Kevin gifts. Roger confronts Bob and threatens him about his relationship with Joan, which Bob replies to by insisting that he and Joan are just "buddies". Bob is later seen carving the turkey at Joan's Thanksgiving dinner, to Roger's surprise.

In season 7, Bob Benson reappears. He is called by a GM executive (Matthew Glave) asking to be bailed out of jail, having been arrested for offering to fellate an undercover police officer. The executive warns Bob that Chevy's advertising is going to become an in-house project, and SC&P is going to lose the account, but assures him not to worry, as Buick will hire him to work for them in Detroit. This prompts Bob to propose marriage to Joan, who turns him down, stating that they both deserve to be with people they love, not spending their lives in "an arrangement". When Bob explains that he needs a wife to assuage the GM executives, Joan learns about the losing of the account but neglects to inform Roger, who is at first incensed, until he realizes it will be an unavoidable blow for Jim Cutler.

=== Glen Bishop ===
Glen Bishop
- First appearance: "Marriage of Figaro" (1.03)
- Last appearance: "The Forecast" (7.10)
- Created by: Matthew Weiner
- Portrayed by: Marten Holden Weiner

In-universe information
- Family: Helen Bishop (mother)

Glen Bishop (Marten Holden Weiner, son of series creator Matthew Weiner) is the son of Betty's neighbor, Helen Bishop. Aged 9 in Season 1 (1960), he develops a crush on Betty. One evening, when she is babysitting him, he purposely walks in on her while she is using the bathroom and looks at her for several seconds. He then later asks for a lock of her hair. She acquiesces, and when Helen discovers it, she angrily confronts Betty in a supermarket, telling her he is just a "little boy", causing an offended Betty to slap Helen across the face. Betty immediately leaves the market, and while her friend Francine offers her support, she also reveals that the incident has become a topic of neighborhood gossip. In Season 2, episode 10, "The Inheritance", Betty discovers that Glen has run away and has been living in the Drapers' backyard playhouse for several days. Glen's father wants Glen to live with him and his new wife and baby, but Glen dislikes his stepmother and says she is mean. He also says his mother is only interested in her boyfriends, and that Glen brushes his little sister's teeth and puts her to bed. Glen and Betty comfort each other because they are both lonely and miserable. He tells Betty that he is there to rescue her. He proposes that Betty elope with him, but she instead calls his mother, which leads him to tell her he hates her.

He returns in Season 4, working for his father at a Christmas tree lot, where he encounters Sally Draper and fixates on her as a replacement for Betty, bonding with her over their now-shared experience as children in divorced families. After discovering that Sally hates living in her house with her mother, Glen breaks in with a friend and vandalizes it, but leaves Sally's room untouched and leaves a secret gift on her bed. Glen often mentions age-inappropriate things to Sally about divorce and tries to encourage her to be secretive.

Betty finds out about Glen's friendship with Sally and forbids him to see her, even going so far as to fire her housekeeper Carla when Carla allows Glen to see Sally one last time before they move to Rye. Betty is partly jealous of her daughter, but also aware of Glen's propensity for unsettling behavior.

However, in Season 5, it is revealed that Glen still speaks to Sally regularly on the telephone from his dorm at the Hotchkiss School, even going so far as to meet clandestinely in New York. Glen is unpopular at school and is frequently picked on, with the entire lacrosse team urinating in his locker. Though he encourages the boys at school to believe Sally is his girlfriend, with whom he has snuck off campus to have sex, Sally and Glen agree their relationship is closer to that of siblings. In season 6, he and Rolo, a friend from Hotchkiss, bring alcohol when visiting Sally and her student hosts at Miss Porter's School. When Rolo makes an unwanted pass at Sally, she tells Glen, who attacks Rolo and they briefly fight before leaving.

In Season 7, an 18-year-old Glen visits the Francis residence to tell Sally he has enlisted in the U.S. Army. His revelation that he has enlisted angers Sally, who condemns him for reversing his earlier stance on the Kent State shootings. Sally asks if he is going to Vietnam, to which Glen says it looks likely, but he has not yet gotten any orders. Later, Glen returns to the house and talks to Betty, revealing he flunked out of school and joined the Army to appease his stepfather. Unlike Sally, Betty considers Glen brave for enlisting.

=== Ida Blankenship ===
Ida Blankenship
- First appearance: "The Rejected" (4.04)
- Last appearance: "The Beautiful Girls" (4.09)
- Created by: Matthew Weiner
- Portrayed by: Randee Heller

In-universe information
- Occupation: Secretary
- Romances: Roger Sterling (ex-lover)

Ida Blankenship (Randee Heller) is Bert Cooper's long-serving secretary. She remains an unseen character until the fourth season, when Joan assigns her to be Don's secretary as punishment to him for having drunkenly seduced and then brushed off his previous secretary, Allison, causing her to have a breakdown at the office. An older woman, Miss Blankenship has a tendency to annoy Don and his co-workers with her salty attitude and eccentric work performance, though having been a secretary for over 40 years, she is quite experienced. Her blunt and cantankerous demeanor starkly contrasts with those of her predecessors and the firm's other secretaries. However, Don acknowledges that she is exactly the type of secretary he needs, as she is not overawed by him and he is unlikely to have an affair with her, which is likely the reason Joan assigned her to him. However, it is mentioned by Bert and Roger that she was rather attractive many years ago. In his tape recordings for his autobiography, Roger claims to have had an affair with Miss Blankenship when he was a very young man at the firm, which caused a rift between Cooper and himself. Roger implies she was sexually adventurous and aggressive, referring to her as the "Queen of Perversions". She is absent from the office for a brief time while she has cataract surgery. Not long after returning she dies, suddenly and unexpectedly, at her desk at Sterling Cooper Draper Pryce in the ninth episode of Season 4, at the age of 67. Heartbroken over her death, Cooper sends her to the Frank E. Campbell Funeral Chapel instead of the morgue and goes out of his way to make sure she has a nicely written obituary, stating: "She was born in 1898 in a barn. She died on the 37th floor of a skyscraper. She's an astronaut."

Actress Randee Heller states she created Blankenship's New York Jewish accent from the memory of her Yiddish-speaking grandparents.

=== Trudy Campbell ===
Trudy Campbell
- First appearance: "New Amsterdam" (1.04)
- Last appearance: "Person to Person" (7.14)
- Created by: Matthew Weiner
- Portrayed by: Alison Brie

In-universe information
- Full name: Gertrude Campbell
- Alias: Trudy Vogel (maiden name)
- Nickname: Trudy
- Family: Tom Vogel (father); Jeannie Vogel (mother); Andrew Campbell (father-in-law); Dorothy Dyckman-Campbell (mother-in-law); Bud Campbell (brother-in-law); Judy Campbell (sister-in-law)
- Spouse: Pete Campbell (husband)
- Children: Tammy Campbell (daughter)

Gertrude "Trudy" Campbell (née Vogel; Alison Brie) is Pete Campbell's wife. She met Pete when they were both in college (Pete was at Dartmouth while Trudy attended Mount Holyoke College); Trudy and Pete marry early in Season 1 and purchase an apartment on Park Avenue, with the help of Trudy's parents. Trudy is dutiful to her husband, even when he asks her to visit an old beau to get a short story published.

In Season 2, she expresses her desire to have a child, a desire Pete resists as he does not want to have children yet, unaware he already conceived a child with Peggy Olson. After discovering she has fertility problems, Trudy wants to adopt a baby, but Pete balks.

In Season 3, Trudy and Pete have a closer relationship than they did before and seem to work together as a team, though Pete manipulates a neighbor's au pair into having sex with him when Trudy is away on her summer vacation with her parents. This leads to the distraught au pair confessing the situation to her host father, who then threatens Pete to stay away from her. In turn, Pete tells Trudy she should never leave him for a long time, implying that it was her absence that led to his cheating.

In Season 4, Trudy becomes pregnant, a fact that Pete uses to secure the Vicks Chemical account for the firm from his father-in-law, Tom Vogel. Later in the season, Trudy gives birth to a daughter, whom they name Tammy.

In season 5, the couple has relocated to Cos Cob, Connecticut, against the wishes of Pete, who prefers living in Manhattan, and while Trudy settles in as a suburban housewife, Pete experiences angst and insecurity, eventually having a brief affair with Beth Dawes (Alexis Bledel), the wife of a fellow commuter. Following some fisticuffs with Beth's husband, Pete desires a pied-à-terre in Manhattan that he can use for affairs, though he tells Trudy he needs it for late nights at work. Trudy is reluctant at first, but finally agrees to let him have a bachelor pad in Manhattan, ostensibly for safety purposes but aware of the real reason.

In Season 6, Pete has a sexual liaison with their neighbor, Brenda, who her husband then beats when he finds out. A distraught, bloody Brenda, wearing only lingerie, shows up at their door. Trudy treats her with the utmost consideration and assistance, then returns home to Pete, furious; she knew Pete would cheat on her but she expected him to be discreet and keep his affairs in Manhattan.

She orders Pete to leave the house, though she refuses to admit defeat by divorcing him. Over the next several months, Pete visits and she gradually begins to accept him back, but she ends it again after her father, not knowing Pete and Trudy are separated, runs into Pete in a Manhattan brothel. Her father removes the Vicks account from Sterling Cooper in response. In retaliation, Pete then tells Trudy that he saw her father at the brothel, which Trudy refuses to believe.

While she is polite to Pete when he says goodbye to her and Tammy before his move to Los Angeles at the end of Season 6, she responds forcefully when Pete hypocritically snaps at her for staying out late one night in Season 7, stating that Pete is "no longer a part of this family." She reluctantly asks Pete for help when their daughter is denied admission to a prestigious preschool and opens up to him about how she is lonely and feels unattractive, leading Pete to compliment her and part on cordial terms.

In the penultimate episode, Pete is offered a job in Wichita and asks Trudy for reconciliation and to come with him. Trudy refuses at first, admitting she still loves him but cannot forget his adultery. However, Pete insists and Trudy agrees, and the two rekindle their marriage. They are last seen with Tammy as they board a flight on a private plane to Wichita.

=== Dawn Chambers ===
Dawn Chambers
- First appearance: "Tea Leaves" (5.03)
- Last appearance: "The Monolith" (7.04)
- Created by: Matthew Weiner
- Portrayed by: Teyonah Parris

In-universe information
- Occupation: Secretary

Dawn Chambers (Teyonah Parris) becomes Don Draper's new secretary in Season 5. She is the only black employee at SCDP, hired after the firm places an "equal opportunity employer" ad in a stunt against rival firm Y&R. She is befriended by Peggy Olson in the fourth episode of Season 5, "Mystery Date", after Peggy lets Dawn stay with her when she discovers Dawn has been sleeping in Don's office due to concerns of racial tensions near Dawn's apartment in Harlem. Dawn proves herself competent at her job and develops a good working relationship with Don. In the Season 6 episode "To Have and to Hold," Joan reprimands Dawn for covering for Harry Crane's secretary by punching her out five hours after the secretary had already left the building. Dawn becomes panicked by the accusation, as she feels she is perpetually at risk of being fired, and she proposes that Joan dock her pay. Quietly impressed and unable to fire Dawn without causing issues for the firm, Joan "punishes" Dawn by putting her in charge of the stockroom and time cards. Little is initially known about Dawn, but in "To Have and to Hold", it is revealed, through a conversation with her best friend, that she feels lonely and alienated as the only black employee at SCDP and, due to her long hours there, she has little opportunity to date. She also comments on SCDP's dysfunctional work environment, where many people are mean to each other and women cry in the bathroom. In season 6's "The Flood," Don and Joan, largely untouched by the struggles of the Civil Rights Movement, connect with the assassination of Rev. Dr. Martin Luther King by empathizing with Dawn over the tragedy. Dawn seems bewildered by Joan's sympathetic hug and insists on remaining at work when Joan and Don suggest she go home. In season 7's "A Day's Work", Dawn is shown paying secret visits to Don's home to keep him apprised of the office activities while Don is on mandatory leave. Don's replacement, Lou Avery, demands that Joan assign him a new secretary due to her loyalty to Don. In the same episode, Joan decides to surrender her personnel management duties, and chooses Dawn to take over from her, a decision which also neatly resolves Lou and Bert Cooper's concerns about Dawn (Bert makes it clear to Joan he doesn't want an African American woman as the first person people would see entering SCDP, which ironically leads Joan to deliberately give Dawn a much more powerful if not visible position in the company). Later episodes show Dawn conducting her new duties with aplomb, straining her relationship with Don.

She is last seen during season 7 episode "Time & Life" as her future following the absorption of SCDP into McCann is not revealed.

=== Jim Cutler ===
Jim Cutler
- First appearance: "The Flood" (6.05)
- Last appearance: "The Strategy" (7.06)
- Created by: Matthew Weiner
- Portrayed by: Harry Hamlin

In-universe information
- Occupation: Cutler, Gleason, and Chaough partner

Jim Cutler (Harry Hamlin) is a partner at the (once) rival firm, Cutler, Gleason, and Chaough and a senior partner at the merged Sterling Cooper & Partners. He first appears in the fifth episode of Season 6, "The Flood". He is the equivalent of Roger Sterling at CGC and Peggy describes him as "just like Roger but with bad breath." Cutler is usually courteous and mild-mannered, which belies his impatience and tendency for childlike escapades.

On one account, he brought his doctor to the newly merged SCDP-CGC office to give everyone a shot of "super vitamins" to help with their working over the weekend for Chevy. Instead of making everyone productive, the booster shot only made Cutler and Stan Rizzo hyperactive, and causes Don to fade in and out of consciousness. He also brought Frank Gleason's daughter Wendy to the office that weekend, shortly after her father's funeral, and later peeked on Stan and Wendy having sex.

He was part of the CGC team that was supposed to present to Chevy and vocally opposed the merger of SCDP and CGC, unless it would win them the account. In the Season 6 episode "A Tale of Two Cities," it appeared as if Cutler still opposed the merger, resentful of his loss of absolute control in the office and feeling disrespected by Michael Ginsberg and annoyed by Bob Benson's constant meddling. He then assigns Bob Benson to Chevy in open defiance of Don and Roger. Ted Chaough, having noticed this, chided Cutler for dividing the firm. As a sort of peace offering and tactical move, Ted and Jim proposed a new name for the merged firms: Sterling Cooper & Partners, removing any partner name from CGC as a sign of goodwill and cooperation.

Cutler supports Don's suspension at the end of Season 6 and is openly opposed to his reinstatement, desiring to morph SC&P into a more technologically driven marketing agency. When Roger negotiates the acquisition of SC&P by McCann-Erickson, Cutler is initially opposed, but eventually concedes, realizing the amount of money his share in the agency will bring him. In Season 7, his status is clarified by Roger, who confirms that Cutler took the cash payoff and retired from the company.

Cutler is a veteran of the Army Air Force and mentions that he participated in the bombing of Dresden in February, 1945.

=== Meredith ===
Meredith
- First appearance: "A Little Kiss" (5.02)
- Last appearance: "The Strategy" (7.06)
- Created by: Matthew Weiner
- Portrayed by: Stephanie Drake

In-universe information
- Occupation: Secretary

Meredith (Stephanie Drake) is a secretary who first appears as SCDP's receptionist during Season 5. Her infantile mannerisms and scatterbrained demeanor annoy Joan, and the two eventually have an altercation in the Season 5 episode "The Christmas Waltz", after Meredith allows a process server with divorce papers into the office to serve Joan. She remains at SCDP and briefly becomes Lou Avery's secretary after he complains about Dawn's continued loyalty to Don who was on involuntary leave from the agency. She becomes Don's secretary when he returns and is openly infatuated with him. When Don vanishes, she becomes one of two secretaries for Roger and moves with him to McCann-Erickson. She is let go by Roger in the series finale, as Don had not returned to work and two secretaries for Roger was unnecessary. She is optimistic even as she is let go as she claims "there are better places than (McCann-Erickson)".

=== Duck Phillips ===
Duck Phillips
- First appearance: "Nixon vs. Kennedy" (1.12)
- Last appearance: "The Milk and Honey Route" (7.13)
- Created by: Matthew Weiner
- Portrayed by: Mark Moses

In-universe information
- Full name: Herman Phillips
- Nickname: Duck
- Occupation: Grey; Head of Account Services (former)
- Spouse: Pauline Phillips (ex-wife)
- Children: Patricia Phillips (daughter); Mark Phillips (son)
- Romances: Peggy Olson (ex-lover)

Herman "Duck" Phillips (Mark Moses) was director of account services for a time at Sterling Cooper. In the Season 1 episode "Indian Summer", when Don Draper is made partner in the wake of Roger Sterling's heart attack, Bert Cooper gives Draper the authority to appoint a new head of account services. At the end of Season 1, Draper brings in Phillips, who is looking for a job after drunkenness and an extramarital affair ended his career at Y&R's London office. Phillips appears to be "on the wagon" (he quit drinking), and his ex-wife and children are moving on with their lives. Phillips immediately challenges Sterling Cooper to broaden their clientele, seeking to attract airlines, automobile manufacturers, and pharmaceuticals.

At the beginning of Season 2, Phillips pushes the agency to hire younger creative talent, a move Draper resists. He also pushes Cooper to pursue American Airlines in the wake of that airline's very public Flight 1 plane crash, forcing Draper to break his word and abandon a client to pursue the larger American Airlines. This event is symbolic of the subsequent relationship between the two; Don got Duck hired despite the risk of Pete Campbell's revealing his true identity, but he clashes with Duck throughout the season, as Don's belief in loyalty to clients and employees is at odds with Duck's pragmatic and utilitarian approach to business. Duck also continues to struggle to stay sober, going so far as to abandon his family's dog, which his children have left with him after informing him that their mother is remarrying and their new step-father does not want a dog, to avoid painful memories. At the end of Season 2, frustrated with his failure to make partner, Phillips goes to some of his former London colleagues to arrange a merger of Sterling Cooper with the British firm Putnam, Powell & Lowe, which wants to establish a New York office. The merger is successful but one of the PP&L executives, St. John (pronounced "SIN-jin") Powell, goads Duck into drinking alcohol, which breaks his sobriety. Phillips is named president of Sterling Cooper but he badly miscalculates his triumph because he does not realize that Don does not have a contract, leading Don to walk out when Duck's new demands as president are too odious to Don. Duck then embarrasses himself in a drunken rant against Don, securing his own dismissal.

During Season 3, it is revealed Duck, apparently sober once more, is now working at Grey, another New York agency. He fails to poach Pete and Peggy from Sterling Cooper, which leads to a sexual relationship with Peggy. They are in bed together when they learn of John F. Kennedy's assassination on November 22, 1963.

Duck surfaces in the Season 4 episode "Waldorf Stories" at the Clio Awards, where he drunkenly heckles the man giving the introductory speech, prompting security to remove him. Sterling jokes: "I miss working with that guy". During "The Suitcase", Duck fails to branch out on his own after being fired from Grey, attempting to create his own female consumer products-based ad agency. He tries to hire Peggy as Creative Director, sending her business cards with her name and title on them. It becomes clear that he is desperate and needs Peggy; she refuses to go along with it. During a late night at SCDP, Peggy catches a drunken Duck spitefully trying to defecate on Roger Sterling's elegant white Poul Volther Corona chair, mistaking it for Don's. While Peggy is walking Duck out, a drunk Don catches him in the office. Don confronts him and he and Duck get into a brief and comical brawl, which Duck wins. Duck states he is a former United States Marine officer and served in the Pacific Theater during the war, claiming to have killed "17 men" during the Battle of Okinawa. Peggy escorts Duck out, later telling Don she turned to Duck because she was having a "confusing time".

In Season 6, a sober Duck reappears as an independent headhunter for advertising positions and Harry Crane recommends to Pete that he meet with him. Duck explains to Pete that the merger between SCDP and CGC has left confusion in the management structure, has left Pete's role unclear and it is difficult for Duck to find prominent positions for Pete in New York. He tells Pete how he turned his life around by concentrating on his family life, so that he had something to give himself pride when he hit rock bottom. He advises Pete to concentrate on managing his own family life to help manage his professional career, and that if he does better for himself at the newly merged company, Duck can find better positions for him in New York.

Pete later asks for Duck's help in getting rid of Bob Benson, hiring Duck to find Bob a position at another agency. Duck asks Pete if the agency is in need of another account man but Pete makes it clear that Duck's previous antagonism with Don will prevent the firm from hiring him. Duck eventually discovers that "Bob Benson" is an alias, and that the man's entire identity is fabricated, with the only prior job on record under Bob's name being that of a manservant to an executive at another agency. Pete had not realized this because no one at SCDP had ever bothered to check any of Bob's references.

In the Season 6 finale, Duck Phillips is seen entering SC&P with Lou Avery, Don's eventual replacement as Creative Director, just after Don is told to take a few months' leave. Duck and Lou run into Don as Don is on his way out of the building. Despite their antagonistic history, Duck apologizes to Don for arriving before Don has left. Duck returns in the penultimate episode of Season 7 "The Milk and Honey Route" to recruit Pete to Learjet. He is depicted as a determined, if slightly desperate, headhunter who is drinking again.

=== Freddy Rumsen ===
Freddy Rumsen
- First appearance: "Babylon" (1.06)
- Last appearance: "The Monolith" (7.04)
- Created by: Matthew Weiner
- Portrayed by: Joel Murray

In-universe information
- Full name: Frederick C. Rumsen
- Nickname: Freddy
- Occupation: Copywriter
- Spouse: Violet Rumsen (wife)

Frederick "Freddy" C. Rumsen (Joel Murray) is a copywriter at Sterling Cooper. He is older than the other copywriters; his eldest daughter turns 30 in Season 2, and he served in World War II. He and Don worked together as copywriters for Sterling Cooper, becoming friends before Don was promoted to Creative Director and became Freddy's boss. He is the first to recognize Peggy Olson's potential as a copywriter in "Babylon" and recommends her to work on an ad campaign for Belle Jolie, which leads to her being promoted to junior copywriter. He is generally well-liked and lighthearted but he is an alcoholic who drinks unusually heavily at work, even by Sterling Cooper standards. This ends up costing him his job in the Season 2 episode "Six Month Leave" when, after having too much to drink, he wets his pants and falls asleep shortly before he is supposed to deliver a pitch to Samsonite. Peggy delivers the pitch instead, and Pete reports the episode to Duck Phillips, who proceeds to report this to Sterling. Rumsen is fired, to Peggy's anger as she feels loyal to Freddy, despite the fact that his departure secured her promotion to senior copywriter. Don and Roger take Freddy out for a night on the town to ease the sting of his departure from the agency. They also tell him he is being sent on "six months' leave," though they really mean that he is fired.

In the Season 4 episode "Christmas Comes But Once a Year", a 16-months sober Freddy returns to work for SCDP on a freelance basis. He has left J. Walter Thompson and brings with him Pond's Cold Cream, a $2 million account that he has secured thanks to a fellow AA member being in charge of the account. His only condition for coming back is that Pete not be allowed near the account. Freddy's newfound sobriety and his status as a sponsor in Alcoholics Anonymous puts him at odds with his coworkers' penchant for heavy drinking. He also clashes with Peggy over his old-fashioned ideals and strategies for marketing to women. Peggy harshly confronts him about how he needs to adapt to the times but the two make amends.

In Season 5, Freddy, recognizing that Peggy cannot rise any further within the company, discreetly begins making job inquiries for her, as his freelance work allows him to interact with many of the advertising agencies on Madison Avenue. This leads Peggy to meet with Ted Chaough. In Season 7, Freddy is still freelancing for Sterling Cooper & Partners (SC&P), and serving as a conduit for Don's ideas, while Don is under suspension from the firm. In "The Monolith," Freddy smuggles a drunk Don out of the office before anyone notices that Don is violating the rules of his return. Freddy lectures Don about putting his job at risk and asks if he wants to end up as a permanent freelancer like Freddy. He tells Don to earn his way back into SC&P's good graces, telling him, "Do the work, Don".

=== Jane Sterling ===
Jane Sterling
- First appearance: "The New Girl" (2.05)
- Last appearance: "The Doorway" (6.02)
- Created by: Matthew Weiner
- Portrayed by: Peyton List

In-universe information
- Alias: Jane Siegel (maiden name)
- Occupation: Secretary (former)
- Family: Danny Siegel (paternal younger cousin brother)
- Spouse: Roger Sterling (ex-husband)
- Children: Margaret Sterling (ex-stepdaughter)

Jane Sterling (née Siegel) (Peyton List) begins as a secretary at Sterling Cooper in Season 2 and is assigned to Don's desk. Her beauty causes her to quickly become a magnet for male attention and she frequently clashes with Joan, who reprimands Jane's overt flirtations. In "The Gold Violin," she convinces a group of employees to sneak into Bert Cooper's office to look at his new painting. Joan confronts her afterwards and Jane attempts to lie, claiming that the men pressured her to join them, before snapping and telling Joan that she does not need a mother. Joan fires her, but Jane seeks Roger on the way out and successfully manipulates him into intervening on her behalf. The two begin an affair shortly thereafter.

He proposes to her in "The Jet Set"; she accepts, and by the start of Season 3, she and Roger are married. However, their marriage is tense. Jane begins drinking heavily and the two frequently argue over how much involvement Jane should have in Margaret's wedding plans. Despite this, Roger repeatedly says his new marriage makes him happy because of Jane's youth and carefree personality. Roger refuses to cheat on Jane, something he repeatedly did with his first wife Mona, and even turns down the advances of an old flame in "The Gypsy and the Hobo." Roger does eventually cheat on Jane with Joan, and with Megan Calvet's mother Marie, seemingly unbeknownst to Jane.

In Season 5's "Faraway Places", Roger and Jane take LSD together, mutually realize their marriage has failed, and agree to divorce. Roger later recruits Jane in the episode "Dark Shadows" to pretend to still be his wife for a client dinner with Manischewitz as he thinks her Jewish background will help win the account. She agrees on the condition that he buy her a new apartment, but Roger becomes jealous when the client's son flirts with Jane. He then seduces Jane in her new apartment, and afterwards Jane is upset because their sexual encounter has ruined her fresh start.

Jane is last seen in the Season 6 premiere, when she attends Roger's mother's memorial service and offers to return the family heirloom ring he gave her. However, Roger tells her to keep it and the two seem to be on better terms.

=== Anna Draper ===
Anna Draper
- First appearance: "The Gold Violin" (2.07)
- Last appearance: "The Suitcase" (4.07)
- Created by: Matthew Weiner
- Portrayed by: Melinda Page Hamilton

In-universe information
- Full name: Anna M. Draper

Anna M. Draper (Melinda Page Hamilton) is the widow of the real Don Draper, the man whose identity Dick Whitman stole after Don's death during the Korean War. She has a noticeable limp as a result of polio and a sister named Patty (Susan Leslie), in whom the real Don Draper was interested before he married Anna. Anna tracks down Dick/Don while he is working as a used car salesman and confronts him about her husband. Dick/Don tells her he died, and despite the circumstances of their meeting, Don and Anna become close friends: he buys her a house in California, Anna often serves as an understanding confidante to Don, and he stays with her whenever he is in Los Angeles. When Don meets Betty, he gets a "divorce" from Anna in order to marry Betty. Don pays Anna another visit during a trip to California during the Season 4 episode "The Good News", during which she has a broken leg. Anna's sister Patty and college-aged niece Stephanie (Caity Lotz) are also staying with Anna during Don's visit to help care for Anna. After dinner out with Anna and Stephanie, Don attempts to make a move on Stephanie, who turns him down and informs him that Anna has terminal cancer, which devastates Don, and that Anna does not know about her diagnosis. Don angrily confronts Patty about this, offering to pay for any possible cancer treatments, but Patty tells him that she has consulted several doctors and confirmed that Anna's cancer is terminal, and asks that Don leave before he can inadvertently tell Anna about her cancer. Don agrees to leave but stays long enough to paint over Anna's water-stained wall, which Anna decorates with a painting of a flower and is signed "Dick + Anna '64" by Don. Later, in the Season 4 episode "The Suitcase", Don repeatedly avoids returning calls from Stephanie, falling asleep and dreaming of an apparition of Anna smiling and holding a suitcase. When he awakens the next morning, he finally returns Stephanie's call and learns that Anna had died the night before, and breaks down in front of Peggy Olson. Don later brings his children to Anna's house in the finale of Season 4, showing them the wall they had painted and introducing them to Stephanie, who gives Don Anna's engagement ring from the real Don Draper. It is Anna's death that then inspires Don to start a new life.

=== Greg Harris ===
Greg Harris
- First appearance: "A Night to Remember" (2.08)
- Last appearance: "Mystery Date" (5.04)
- Created by: Matthew Weiner
- Portrayed by: Samuel Page

In-universe information
- Occupation: Thoracic Surgeon; Army Surgeon
- Spouse: Joan Harris (wife)
- Children: Kevin Harris (ex-stepson)

Dr. Greg Harris (Samuel Page) is Joan's ex-husband, as of Season 5. During his engagement to Joan in Season 2, she brings him with her to Sterling Cooper to close up, at which time, feeling threatened by Joan's rapport with Roger, he rapes her on the floor of Don's office. After failing to become chief surgical resident because his brown-nosing and entitlement do not make up for his subpar surgical skills, he whines at length to Joan and insults her, and she smashes a vase over his skull. Greg later decides to join the Army, which is desperate for surgeons, not believing he may be shipped to the front line in Vietnam. He does not consult Joan prior to enlisting, but before leaving for basic training he states his desire to start a family. After basic training, Greg is sent directly to Vietnam. While there, he learns that Joan is pregnant, but is unaware that Roger Sterling is the father.

In Season 5, Greg returns from his initial deployment and is overjoyed to meet his new "son" Kevin, but tells Joan that he has been ordered to return to Vietnam for another year. However, at a homecoming dinner with Joan's mother and Greg's parents, it becomes clear that Greg volunteered to return, contrary to what he told Joan, preferring the status and respect his rank confers to being with his family. Joan is furious that he lied to her and made such an important decision without her, and tells him to leave and not come back. When he tells her the army makes him feel like a "good man", she tells him he was never a good man, implicitly referencing the rape. He storms out, and a few months later serves Joan with divorce papers at the office, humiliating and infuriating her.

It is revealed in the series finale that, following his divorce from Joan, Greg remarried and had twins with a nurse. He also disowned Kevin and refused to be involved in his upbringing in any way, despite still having no idea that Kevin is not his biological son.

=== Sylvia Rosen ===
Sylvia Rosen
- First appearance: "The Doorway" (6.01)
- Last appearance: "New Business" (7.09)
- Created by: Matthew Weiner
- Portrayed by: Linda Cardellini

In-universe information
- Spouse: Arnold Rosen (husband)
- Romances: Don Draper (ex-lover)

Sylvia Rosen (Linda Cardellini) is Arnie's wife, Mitchell's doting mother, and Don's mistress for much of Season 6. She is Italian, a plumber's daughter, and a housewife who, unlike Megan, affects visible displays of her Catholicism (wearing a Catholic crucifix and displaying Catholic icons in her bedroom), although her husband is implied to be Jewish. Sylvia is strong-willed, unhappy, and intelligent, and like Don, expresses interest in ending their liaison eventually. She is also friendly with Megan; this relationship significantly contributes to her ending her affair with Don, after she dreams that he died in a plane crash and she had to comfort Megan at the funeral. Don is heartbroken after Sylvia breaks it off, but she reminds him that he was happy with Megan once and can be so again. Nevertheless, Don becomes obsessed with Sylvia and of thinking of ways to get her back. In the Season 6 episode "The Crash", while all of SCDP has been injected with a stimulant so they can work through the night to come up with work for Chevy, Don works feverishly too, but it turns out he is focused only on thinking of an inspiration to get Sylvia back, not with inspiration for Chevy. Elements of Sylvia's physical appearance, such as her brunette hair and a facial mole, and her wearing a headwrap and kimono remind Don of his stepmother Abigail and of the maternal prostitute, Aimée Swenson, who forcibly initiated his first sexual act when he was a young teen.

When Don arranges with Ted to get Mitchell into the National Guard to avoid going to Vietnam, Sylvia is overcome by the favor and falls back into bed with Don, but Don's adolescent daughter Sally walks in on them. Sylvia reacts vehemently with guilt as Don runs after Sally. She is last seen with her husband in Season 7, having reconciled with Arnie and ended her relationship with Don.

=== Margaret Sterling Hargrove ===
Margaret Sterling
- First appearance: "Babylon" (1.06)
- Last appearance: "The Monolith" (7.04)
- Created by: Matthew Weiner
- Portrayed by: Elizabeth Rice

In-universe information
- Full name: Margaret Sterling
- Family: Roger Sterling (father); Mona Sterling (mother)
- Spouse: Brooks Hargrove (husband)
- Children: Ellery Hargrove (son)

Margaret Sterling (Elizabeth Rice) is Roger and Mona Sterling's only child. Roger thinks of her as spoiled and immature, complaining to Joan that she has no motivation to do anything with her life. It is strongly implied but never outright stated that she has mental illness issues. In Season 2, she becomes engaged to Brooks Hargrove, a rich bore whom she barely has interest in and whom her parents both immediately dislike. Margaret is hostile to Roger and Jane after their marriage and attempts to have Jane disinvited from her wedding. When John F. Kennedy is assassinated the day before her wedding, Margaret is distraught that the event has effectively ruined her big day. Roger and Mona convince her to proceed with the ceremony, which is a miserable affair where the small number of attendees are devastated over the death of the President. In the Season 6 premiere, she is disappointed that her grandmother has not left her any money and tries to convince Roger to invest in Brooks' refrigerator car technology venture, much to his annoyance and refusal.

In Season 6's "The Flood," she is shown to have a toddler-aged son, Ellery. After Ellery gets nightmares from seeing Planet of the Apes with Roger, Margaret berates Roger for his poor judgement and tells him that he is not allowed to see his grandson without Mona present.

In Season 7's "Time Zones", Margaret invites Roger to brunch at the Plaza to condescendingly "forgive" him. Later, in "The Monolith," Mona and Brooks inform Roger that Margaret has abandoned her family to join a commune in upstate New York, where she has taken the new name "Marigold". Roger and Mona try to persuade her to return for Ellery's sake, but she insists her son cannot be happy if she is unhappy. Although Mona gives up and leaves, Roger stays for the night to understand Margaret's point of view. He becomes disgusted when he realizes that Margaret is a participant in the free-love lifestyle, and attempts to force her off of the farm, reminding her that she is a mother and cannot abandon her responsibilities. Margaret berates him for being an absent father during her own childhood and declares that she is similarly entitled to behave selfishly and that Ellery will be fine. In the series finale, Roger tells Joan that Margaret is "lost" and he has written her out of his last will and testament, while telling a surprised Joan he has written a large estate share to be bequeathed to her son Kevin.

== Recurring characters ==
=== Allison ===
Allison (Alexa Alemanni) was Don Draper's secretary, first at Sterling Cooper and later at Sterling Cooper Draper Pryce. Allison was first seen as Sterling Cooper's receptionist. By Season 3, she had become Don Draper's secretary. Though her character was little developed during the first three seasons, she was depicted as being competent and friendly. She is seen occasionally flirting with Ken, and during Joan's going-away party she was seen sitting on Ken's lap. Although Don's sudden formation of Sterling Cooper Draper Pryce was accomplished without Allison's knowledge (she initially declares that the agency had been robbed when she comes into Don's office and discovers it ransacked), Don eventually brought her to the new firm as his secretary. On the night of the office Christmas Party in 1964, Don asked Allison to bring him his apartment keys, which he had forgotten at work. Upon her entering his apartment, the drunken Don seduced Allison, and they had an impulsive sexual encounter. The next morning, he brusquely makes it clear to Allison that he will pretend as though nothing happened between them. Allison continued to work for Don, despite the awkwardness and his frequent coldness toward her, but breaks down crying in a focus group about beauty that led to a discussion about men and relationships. She confronts Don about their encounter and, having decided to leave, asks Don for a recommendation letter. When he suggests that she write herself a glowing reference so he can sign it, Allison becomes angry with his lack of sensitivity and throws a brass cigarette dispenser at him and runs out of the office in tears. She is replaced by Ida Blankenship, and when Ida dies at her desk, Megan, who would go on to marry Don. When Megan and Don have their first romantic encounter, Megan reassures him that she would never behave like Allison the next morning.

=== Joey Baird ===
Joey Baird (Matt Long) is a freelance artist for Sterling Cooper Draper Pryce, first seen at the start of the fourth season. Joey and Peggy seem to enjoy working together, reenacting the "John and Marsha" comedy skit in a workroom and laughing. Joey is also rather crude, acts entitled, frequently makes insensitive remarks, and engages in sexual harassment. Joey misinterprets Harry Crane's friendly offer to help him get acting jobs and to go out for coffee as homosexual advances.

Joey is anti-authoritarian and while disrespectful behind Don and Lane's backs as some other SCDP employees are, is (unlike them) openly defiant of Joan. Things come to a head in "The Summer Man", when Joey reveals she reminds him of his mother, who he says is "a Joan" at her job; he speaks contemptuously about and to Joan, alleging she got her job by having sex with men in the office, because she lacks any skills of her own, calls her a "madame" and a "Shanghai whore", tells her she walks around the office like she "want[s] to get raped" and draws a pornographic picture of Joan and Lane Pryce engaged in oral sex and tapes it to the glass door of her office. Joan's efforts to control and admonish Joey herself fail to accomplish anything and Joey escalates his insulting and defiant behavior. She attempts to have Don and Lane handle him, emphasizing the problems with his work while indirectly referencing his transgressions toward her. Her attempts to indirectly deal with the situation fail. At first, Peggy's repeated efforts to confront his sexist attitudes are as his peer but Joey brushes her aside.

Peggy ultimately shows Don the obscene drawing and, at his suggestion, empowers herself by ordering Joey as his superior to apologize to Joan and fires the shocked freelancer when he refuses to comply. In the aftermath, Joan is angry at Peggy about the firing because she perceives it as Peggy acting to "look important" and causing Joan to look like a "glorified secretary" lacking power, respect, or authority, and needing Peggy to fight her battles for her.

=== Jimmy and Bobbie Barrett ===
Bobbie Barrett (Melinda McGraw) is the wife and manager of comedian Jimmy Barrett (born Jimmy Bernstein) (Patrick Fischler), an insult comic (reminiscent of Don Rickles) whom the firm uses in their advertisements for Utz Potato Chips. After Jimmy insults the wife of Utz's owner about her weight, Don has to intercede and ends up meeting Bobbie, who shrugs off her husband's behavior. After that meeting, Bobbie seduces Don, though he initially resists as he wants to remain faithful to his marriage vows, despite his previous infidelities. When Bobbie later (in a ladies' lounge at Lutèce, where they and the Schillings are meeting for the apology) tries to get Don to pay more for the apology as her husband's pay-or-play contract does not require it, Don grabs her hair with one hand and puts the other up her skirt, then threatens to ruin Jimmy if he does not apologize, and with no financial bonus. Bobbie appears to enjoy the dominating treatment, and quickly signals her husband to apologize. Later, she comes to Don with a TV pitch called "Grin and Barrett", a Candid Camera-type show, featuring her husband using his insult comic skills as the host. Don helps her arrange things, and they continue to see each other on the side, until the two are in a car accident that requires a cover story.

The two resume their affair after a hiatus following the accident, but Don breaks it off completely and abruptly, when Bobbie reveals to him that she and other women with whom Don has had affairs have been discussing his prowess as a lover. Upset to learn that he has a "reputation" and annoyed at his inability to control Bobbie, Don leaves her during the middle of a sexual encounter, while she is tied up. Later, during a party where Don, Jimmy, and their spouses are in attendance, Jimmy reveals to Betty that Don and Bobbie have had an affair, and Jimmy also confronts Don and gloats about the trouble he has just unleashed for Don. Betty is humiliated by the revelation; though she may have suspected affairs, Don's affair with Bobbie appears to be the only one Betty has been told about, leading to a period of separation for her and Don. Don later encounters Jimmy in an underground casino and punches Jimmy in the face, knocking him off his feet, which Jimmy later disparages as "nothing".

=== Helen Bishop ===
Helen Bishop (Darby Stanchfield) is one of the Drapers' neighbors. She is a liberal divorcée with two children and a Mount Holyoke College graduate. Helen works in a jewelry store and volunteers for John F. Kennedy's presidential campaign. Her divorce and habit of taking long walks have made her the subject of gossip for women in the neighborhood. A further rift develops between Helen and Betty Draper when the former discovers that Betty has given Helen's son Glen a lock of hair while babysitting him one evening. When Helen confronts Betty at the grocery store, Betty slaps her across the face. It is later discovered that Glen ran away from his home to stay in the Drapers' playhouse in the hopes of eloping with Betty; however, Betty calls Helen to retrieve her son, much to Glen's dismay. Betty later confides in Helen about her brief separation from Don, and the two seem to reach some kind of understanding. Later, Helen remarries and sends Glen to a boarding school at her new husband's request.

=== Richard Burghoff ===
Richard Burghoff (Bruce Greenwood) is a wealthy real estate mogul who becomes romantically involved with Joan in Season 7. After meeting Joan while she is in Los Angeles for business, he talks her into a date, which leads to a romantic encounter. A recently divorced, semi-retired millionaire with two grown children, Richard is exhilarated to be free to do as he pleases. He flies to New York on a whim and continues pursuing Joan. Their second date ends badly when he learns of the existence of her young son and becomes angry at the thought of Joan having commitments that will not allow her to pursue the kind of freewheeling lifestyle he envisions for himself. The next day, he shows up at Joan's office and apologizes, and they begin a relationship.

Joan continues seeing Richard and he comforts her when she begins to have problems transitioning to work at McCann Erickson, offering semi-jokingly to have a sexist co-worker beaten up. After she quits McCann, Joan spends an increasing amount of time with Richard, flying to Key West for a getaway and trying cocaine together. However, when she begins to plan a new business venture of her own, Richard becomes angry that she does not share his desire for a responsibility-free life. When Joan refuses to choose between her career and her relationship with him, he ends their relationship without saying goodbye.

=== Émile Calvet ===
Émile Calvet (Ronald Guttman) is Megan Calvet's pompous and arrogant father. Émile is an academic, an atheist, and a Marxist, and does not approve of Don. In "At the Codfish Ball", it is revealed that he has written a book and Marie believes he is having an affair with his graduate teaching assistant. He, in turn, seems bitter toward his wife, accusing her of infidelity; he is much closer to Megan than to Marie and urges Megan to pursue her dreams. Megan is frustrated with his politics, however, particularly with the attitudes he expresses following the assassinations of Rev. Dr. Martin Luther King, Jr. and Bobby Kennedy.

=== Marie Calvet ===
Marie Calvet (Julia Ormond) is Megan's mother; she has at least one more daughter, Marie-France, and ten grandchildren. When first introduced, she lives in Montreal with her husband, Émile, to whom she is unhappily married. Her accent indicates she is from France rather than Canada, and she indicates some knowledge of Paris while speaking with Arnie Rosen. Attractive, yet vain and prickly, Marie has a strained relationship with her husband Émile, as well as Megan and Don, and is not especially supportive of Megan's acting dreams, telling her "not every little girl gets to do what she wants; the world cannot support that many ballerinas". Marie has a short affair with Roger Sterling in Season 5; Sally discovers her fellating Roger at Don's award dinner in "At the Codfish Ball". Later, Roger wants Marie to watch out for him while he takes LSD, but Marie tells Roger he is "too old" to take LSD and she does not want to be his support; she then leaves him, causing Roger to take his second acid trip alone.

In season 6, Marie and Arnie Rosen flirt mildly and Roger suggests she accompany him and the Drapers to a business dinner with the coarse, crude Herb Rennet and his irritating wife, Peaches. Roger stands them up and an unhappy Marie makes insulting remarks in French about Peaches to Megan. When Roger phones the house later that night to talk business with Don, Marie answers the phone, insults Roger, and hangs up on him twice, telling him to forget her name. In season 7's "New Business", Marie meets Megan in New York to collect Megan's remaining possessions from Don's apartment as a result of their forthcoming divorce. After Megan leaves early for a lunch date and asks Marie to supervise the movers, Marie has them loot the apartment, removing Don's possessions as well as Megan's. Marie and Roger also resume their affair, which Megan learns of accidentally. She remains in New York after Megan returns to California, her marriage to Émile having apparently ended, as Roger notes in "Time & Life" that he is on his way to meet her for a date. By the final episode of the season, she and Roger have become a married couple and spend their honeymoon in France.

=== Andrew and Dorothy Campbell ===
Andrew Campbell (Christopher Allport) is Pete Campbell's father. He disapproves of Pete's profession and treats him with contempt. In Season 2, Andrew dies in the crash of American Airlines Flight 1; it is revealed that he has squandered his wife's fortune and family's inheritance on a lavish lifestyle and by donating large sums of money to Lincoln Center and the Botanical Garden to maintain the appearance that he is wealthy.

Dorothy "Dot" Dyckman Campbell (Channing Chase) is Pete's somewhat detached mother who comes from a prominent New York City family. Pete hates his mother and jokes with his brother Bud about it, mentioning Hitchcock's Rope. Dorothy greatly disapproves of Pete and Trudy's exploration into adoption, referring to orphans as "someone else's discards" and saying she will disinherit him if he adopts a child. Insulted, Pete reveals the truth about the family's fortunes to his mother, leaving her stunned. By Season 6 she suffers extensive memory lapses and is diagnosed with some form of dementia. When Bud foists her upon Pete, he is upset and annoyed with the situation, and resorts to exploiting her illness to keep her under control. Pete eventually hires Manolo, a Spanish nurse recommended to him by Bob Benson. Manolo initially works out quite well, but Dorothy begins implying that they are involved in a satisfying sexual relationship. Pete fires Manolo for sexually assaulting his mother, much to Dorothy's fury. Bob tells Pete that Manolo is gay, leaving it ambiguous as to what is actually happening. In the season finale it is revealed Dorothy married Manolo on a cruise ship and later "fell" overboard, implying Manolo married her to receive her (non-existent) riches and pushed her from the ship. Pete and Bud accept that it would be too expensive to pursue justice against Manolo, telling each other that "she's in the water, with Father," and "she loved the sea."

=== Bud and Judy Campbell ===
Andrew "Bud" Campbell, Jr. (Rich Hutchman) and Judy (Miranda Lilley) are Pete's elder brother and sister-in-law. Bud is an accountant and is the strongly favored child of their parents; it is understood that he alone will inherit his father's fortune. It is further shown when following her husband's death, Dorothy Campbell refers to her sons as "salt and pepper". After the death of their father in "Flight 1", Bud reveals to Pete the precarious financial state their father created and arranges for the liquidation of their mother's assets so that she can live comfortably. Bud tells Pete that he and Judy have no plans to have children, and he lets slip to their mother Pete and Trudy's exploration of adoption. In Season 6, Bud is angry when Pete selects a third party investment bank to take SCDP public rather than involving his business. In the episode "In Care Of", Bud and Pete tacitly agree to not pursue a potentially costly investigation of Manolo Colon, after learning he had eloped with their mother, who disappeared off the cruise ship on which they were honeymooning.

=== Tammy Campbell ===
Tammy Campbell is Pete and Trudy Campbell's only child. Tammy was born between September 7 and 10, 1965. The labor was long and difficult. Pete and Trudy Campbell believed they could not conceive a child, and they had consulted a fertility specialist. They discussed adoption, could not agree about it, and it was then revealed in Season 4's episode, "The Rejected.” that Trudy's father disclosed Trudy's pregnancy to Pete. Trudy's father, Tom, said he would give Pete $1,000 if the baby were a boy and $500 if it were a girl.

Tammy's mother, Trudy Campbell, is unaware of Pete's child with Peggy Olson.

=== Carla ===
Carla (Deborah Lacey) is a black woman who has worked as housekeeper for the Draper household since Sally's birth. Carla is shown to be the true maternal influence in Sally and Bobby's lives and is seen watching the children for extended periods of time, such as when Betty dashes off to Nevada with Henry to seek a quick divorce from Don. Throughout the first three seasons, Carla tries to offer marital advice to Betty. She continues to work for Betty after the latter divorces Don and marries Henry Francis, until being fired for allowing Glen Bishop to visit Sally. Carla later telephones Henry for a reference because Betty would not give her a written one for her job search. Though her character is often on the show's periphery, Carla has far more insight into the issues surrounding Don and Betty's marriage than perhaps anyone else. A silent critic of the couple's behavior, it is apparent that Carla recognizes how Don and Betty's relationship is affecting the development of their children.

=== Caroline ===
Caroline (Beth Hall) is Roger Sterling's longtime secretary, first appearing in Season 4's "Christmas Comes But Once a Year". She is very well liked by nearly everyone at SCDP and is extremely loyal to Roger, being apparently close enough to him that she is able to speak her mind to him when she feels he is out of line. She is also close to Roger's family, becoming very upset when she learns of Roger's mother's death. Of the secretaries at SCDP, she seems to be the one closest to Joan.

=== Toni Charles ===
Toni Charles (Naturi Naughton) is a black Playboy Bunny with whom Lane Pryce has an extramarital affair in Season 4, after his wife Rebecca and their son return to the UK. Lane seems to genuinely be in love with her, but their relationship comes to an abrupt end when Lane's father forces him to return to the UK and reconcile with Rebecca.

=== Clara ===
Clara (Alexandra Ella) is Pete Campbell's secretary, first appearing during Season 3. She is well regarded and remains professional and unmoved by Pete's frequent angry outbursts and verbal abuse, which are often directed at her. She is pregnant in much of season 6, and Ken mentions that one of the account men, Torkelson, is the father and has decided not to take responsibility for the baby. She does not appear in season 7.

=== Manolo Colon ===
Manolo Colon (aka Marcus Constantine) (Andres Faucher) is a con-artist associate of Bob Benson's whom Bob convinces Pete Campbell to hire in Season 6 as a personal nurse to Campbell's mother, Dorothy, after she begins to show signs of dementia. He is fired by Campbell after being suspected of sexually abusing Dorothy but remains in contact with her. They eventually marry on a cruise ship before he murders her by throwing her overboard in hopes of inheriting her wealth, which, unbeknownst to him (and, presumably, Bob), had been depleted by her late husband.

=== Cynthia Cosgrove ===
Cynthia Cosgrove (Larisa Oleynik) (née Baxter) is Ken Cosgrove's wife and the daughter of Ed (Ray Wise), the CEO of Corning. Cynthia is a New York society girl, who appears to have moved in the same Manhattan social circles as the presumably older Trudy Campbell, with whom she gets along well. Ken calls Cynthia "his life" and does not want to use her or his future father-in-law to get business, claiming in Season 4 that he does not want to be like Pete Campbell. In the Season 5 premiere, her character is listed during the credits as Cynthia Cosgrove, implying she and Ken were married between the fourth and fifth seasons. Cynthia appears as a background character in several episodes of Season 5. She is very supportive of Ken's work and his side hobby as an author. She and Ken live in Jackson Heights, Queens. In the third episode of Season 7, it is revealed that Cynthia and Ken now have an infant son, Edward.

=== Jennifer Crane ===
Jennifer Crane (Laura Regan) is Harry Crane's wife. Blonde and charismatic, Jennifer has the peculiarity of being a "working wife", at least until Season 3, holding a position as a supervisor at AT&T. She is from a blue-collar environment, which has helped her keep her husband grounded. Solidary, no-nonsense and generous, Jennifer has often tried to "fit in" with the more sophisticated circle of people surrounding Harry's workplace and has an unspoken rivalry of sorts with Trudy Campbell. She briefly threw Harry out of the house when he confessed to having a one-night stand with one of the secretaries, Hildy, but the two soon reconciled. She and Harry are parents to a daughter, Beatrice Grace, born in 1962. Sometime between the fifth and sixth seasons, they have twin sons, Nathan and Steven. It's implied but not outright stated that Harry and Jennifer get divorced in 1970, because Harry outright says he is delaying acceptance of a partnership at SCDP because once the divorce the final he won't have to share any of the profits with Jennifer. However, bad luck and timing lead to Roger nixing the partnership offer to Harry, and Harry presumably continuing the divorce process as the series ends.

=== Dale ===
Dale (Mark Kelly) is a copywriter. He first appears in Episode 2 of Season 1 ("Ladies Room"), and reappears in Episode 1 of Season Two ("For Those Who Think Young"), Episode 6 of Season 3 ("Guy Walks into an Advertising Agency"), and Episode 11 of Season 5 ("The Other Woman").

=== Midge Daniels ===
Midge Daniels (Rosemarie DeWitt) is an art illustrator engaged in an affair of several years' duration with Don Draper in Season 1. She is involved with beatniks and several proto-hippies, smokes marijuana, and makes several references to Jack Kerouac and Allen Ginsberg. It appears Midge has other lovers besides Don. When Don realizes she is in love with Roy, one of her beatnik friends, through a Polaroid he takes of the two, he ends his affair with her and gives her the bonus he received at work. She reappears in the Season 4 episode "Blowing Smoke" where she runs into Don at his office building, claiming to be there for a business meeting for her paintings. After inviting him back to her apartment to meet her husband, it is revealed that Midge tracked Don down to try and coax him into giving them money to fuel their heroin addiction, as well as to buy one of her paintings. Initially writing them a check for $300 for one of her paintings out of pity, Don instead gives Midge $120 in cash he had in his wallet following advances made by Midge and leaves with one of her paintings.

=== Gene Draper ===
Eugene Scott "Gene" Draper (Evan Londo) is Don and Betty Draper's youngest child. He was born during Season 3, on June 21, 1963, and is named after Betty's late father, Gene Hofstadt. His sister, Sally, first thinks that Gene is a reincarnation of their grandfather, as he is born shortly after their grandfather dies and is given the same room their grandfather had lived in, and is terrified of him, but she eventually grows to love her brother after Don comforts Sally and tells her that Gene is a baby and nobody knows who he is going to be yet. He speaks his first line in the premiere of Season 5 (“Good night, Daddy”) and his second and last line in the penultimate episode of the series (“No”).

=== Abe Drexler ===
Abe Drexler (Charlie Hofheimer) is Peggy Olson's boyfriend, beginning in Season 4. Abe, who is Jewish, is a freelance journalist with strongly expressed liberal/leftist political views. He and Peggy first meet at a loft party in a sweatshop. Another meeting is engineered by their mutual friend Joyce Ramsay, where Abe's progressive views on race, combined with his mild sexist attitude, rub Peggy the wrong way. When he brings her a piece he wrote condemning the capitalist attitudes of Wall Street, which names some of the firms with which Sterling Cooper Draper Pryce is contracted, Peggy loses her temper with Abe. In spite of this, they later reconcile and become a couple. In Season 5, Abe asks Peggy to move in together which, after some contemplation and Joan's encouragement, Peggy accepts. Despite some problems (including criticism from Peggy's mother, who objects both to the fact that Abe is not Catholic, as well as the fact that Peggy has chosen to live with a man to whom she is not married), they settle into a life together, eventually purchasing a run-down building on the Upper West Side midway through Season 6, which they renovate and live in. However, Abe proves incompetent at home repair, has far too lax of an attitude towards the crime in the neighborhood, and never tells the tenants to behave or be quiet, much to the chagrin of Peggy. He also refuses to identify a group of teenagers who stabbed him at the train station and instead turns it into an issue about race, further angering Peggy. Peggy and Abe become increasingly frustrated with the different directions their lives are taking, and after a serious incident in which Peggy accidentally stabs him, Abe ends the relationship.

=== Suzanne Farrell ===
Suzanne Farrell (Abigail Spencer) is Sally Draper's third grade teacher at the beginning of Season 3. She engages in an extended period of flirtation with Don, and they eventually enter into a sexual relationship after Sally has moved on to the next grade. She lives in an apartment above the garage of a single-family, detached house. Her younger brother, Danny (Marshall Allman), suffers from epileptic seizures and as a result has become something of a drifter, unable to keep a job for very long. At the end of Season 3, Don signals a desire to strengthen his and Suzanne's relationship, but his plans are scuttled when Betty unexpectedly returns home from a vacation and confronts Don about his past. She is not seen again and is the last person with whom Don has an affair while married to Betty.

=== Lee Garner, Jr. ===
Lee Garner, Jr. (Darren Pettie), is an executive at Lucky Strike, a cigarette company with a very long relationship with Sterling Cooper that began with Roger's father. Boorish, bossy, boozy, and sexually predatory to both women and (secretly) men, Lee's behavior is accepted because his father runs Lucky Strike, which represents the lion's share of Sterling Cooper's business.

In Season 3, Lee Garner, Jr., sexually propositions Sal Romano, only to be rebuffed. Not taking the rejection lightly, Garner, Jr., uses his clout to have Sal fired from Sterling Cooper. As Don explains to Sal after Roger fires him, "Lucky Strike can shut off our lights" and the agency could thus not risk losing the account by defending Sal.

Garner, in Season 4, invites himself to the SCDP 1964 Christmas party, forcing the company to overstep its tight budget to make the party a grander affair for their most important client. At the party, Garner gropes female employees and further humiliates Roger by forcing him to dress up in a Santa suit. Several months later, Garner abruptly informs Roger Sterling that Lucky Strike will be ending their business with SCDP, by going to BBDO, sending the agency into crisis.

=== Lee Garner, Sr. ===
Lee Garner, Sr. (John Cullum) is an executive at Lucky Strike, a cigarette company with a very long relationship with Sterling Cooper. A proud, no-nonsense man in his seventies, he and Bert Cooper go way back. He eventually turns executive power over to his son due to ill health.

=== Father Gill ===
Father John Gill (Colin Hanks) is a young Catholic priest in a visiting ministry at the church Peggy's family attends in Brooklyn. He first appears in the Season 2 episode "Three Sundays". The fact that he is a Jesuit priest is indicated by the "S.J." after his name on church bulletins in the same episode. He asks Peggy for advice about public speaking and advertising church events such as a youth dance after learning about her employment in advertising, and changes the style of his Palm Sunday sermon to include more colloquialisms and be more accessible to his congregation after listening to Peggy's criticisms; he later gives her a copy of the sermon. He learns about Peggy's pregnancy during the confession of Peggy's sister, Anita, and he appears to take an interest in bringing Peggy more fully into the church community. His progressiveness manifests itself at the end of "A Night to Remember", when he pulls out a guitar and begins to sing a folk-gospel song. He subtly indicates to Peggy that he would hear her confession if she wished, stating that "no sin is too great for God." Additionally, he expresses a desire for her to receive the Eucharist. However, Peggy is uncertain how involved she wishes to become in the church community and in the Catholic faith, although she appreciates Father Gill's friendship. Their relationship is a bit strained by the fact that Anita's confession, including the particulars of Peggy's pregnancy, was based on a mistaken assumption about the identity of the child's father. Peggy later confides to Don that her whole family believes he was the father because Don was the only non-family member to visit her in the hospital.

=== Francine Hanson ===
Francine Hanson (Anne Dudek) is one of Betty Draper's closest friends and neighbors in the first four seasons, before Betty moves from Ossining. Francine spends many afternoons gossiping with Betty about the neighborhood's newest resident, divorcée Helen Bishop. Francine, who is married to Carlton Hanson, has a son named Ernie and is pregnant in Season 1, giving birth to a baby girl named Jessica. Francine confides to Betty that she thinks Carlton is having an affair, as he makes secret phone calls to Manhattan and sleeps at the Waldorf Astoria two nights a week; she tells Betty she wishes she could poison him. Even Don is uncomfortable with Carlton, who confides his attraction to Jessica's young babysitter. By Season 2 the couple has reconciled somewhat; Carlton appears to have gained weight, and the insinuation is that food has become a substitute for womanizing. After Betty and her family leave Ossining, Francine appears only once, meeting Betty for lunch in the Season 7 episode "Field Trip", by which time she is working as a travel agent in Dobbs Ferry.

=== Brooks Stanford Hargrove ===
Brooks Hargrove (Derek Ray) is the dutiful husband of Roger Sterling's daughter Margaret. They were married on November 23, 1963, the day after John F. Kennedy was assassinated. In the Season 6 premiere, following Roger's mother's memorial service, Margaret asks her father to invest in Brooks' refrigerator car technology venture. Later in the season, she withdraws her Thanksgiving invitation because Roger declines to invest. In Season 7, Margaret abandons Brooks and their son Ellery to live in a commune in upstate New York. He is last seen watching the TV broadcast of the Apollo 11 moon landing alongside Ellery, Roger, and Mona.

=== Conrad Hilton ===
Conrad "Connie" Hilton (Chelcie Ross) is the fictional portrayal of the real founder of the Hilton Hotels chain, one of the only times the show portrayed a historical figure in person. He first meets Don Draper, who initially presumes Conrad is a bartender, at a country club where Don is a guest at Roger Sterling's Kentucky Derby party and Connie is a guest at a wedding reception. They share their hardscrabble beginnings and laugh about Don's urinating in the trunks of fancy clients' cars at the roadhouse where he had worked as a valet. Connie later seeks out Don's help with an advertising campaign, and thus becomes a Sterling Cooper client. Hilton is depicted as a demanding client and difficult to please; he is known to call Don during the middle of the night and to show up in Don's office unannounced. After sending Don to numerous Hilton properties throughout the country, Connie flies Don to meet him at the Hilton property in Rome, with Betty joining at the last minute to help put the property through its paces. Connie is behind Sterling Cooper forcing Don to sign an employment contract with the agency. Don begins to see Connie as something of a father figure whom Don seeks to impress, but Connie is ultimately unsatisfied with Don's work. At the end of Season 3 he gives Don the heads-up that Putnam, Powell & Lowe, Sterling Cooper's parent agency, will be bought by McCann-Erickson. The two part ways vowing to try working again in the future, but Hilton never returns to the show even after the founding of SCDP.

=== Gene Hofstadt ===
Eugene "Gene" Hofstadt (Ryan Cutrona) is Betty's elderly father, who does not approve of Don. A businessman of some kind in the affluent Philadelphia Main Line area and a veteran of World War I, he first appears in Season 1 when, several months after his wife's death, he begins dating another woman, Gloria Massey, which upsets Betty. He marries Gloria sometime between November 1960 and April 1962. In 1962, Gene suffers a series of small strokes that leave him with impaired mental abilities, emotional lability, and short-term memory loss. He becomes repeatedly confused, believing himself to be back in the Army or in the midst of prohibition; he mistakes his daughter Betty for his wife and fondles her. He also becomes more openly critical of Don, berating him in front of others and accusing him of not appreciating Betty; Don later tells Betty that he and Gene had a kind of mutual hatred for each other. His declining health eventually leads to Gloria leaving him in early 1963, leading him to move in with the Drapers at Don's instigation in the Season 3 episode "Love Among the Ruins". He becomes especially close with his granddaughter, Sally Draper, before dying in June 1963 in the Season 3 episode "The Arrangements", shortly before his youngest grandchild is born. Betty names her new son "Eugene" in honor of her late father.

=== William and Judy Hofstadt ===
William Hofstadt (Eric Ladin) is Betty Draper's younger brother. He and his wife Judy (Megan Henning) have three daughters. William and Betty disagree over the disposition of their father's house, since Betty does not want William to live there nor inherit the house, as well as arguing over how their father will be cared for as his health deteriorates. Although William is shown to be jealous of his father favoring Betty as a child, Judy seems to be a warm and kind caregiver for Gene. Don and Betty share a dislike of William and Judy for their selfishness and inability to control their unruly children.

In the series finale, despite Betty's strained relationship with William and Judy, she feels they should raise Bobby and Gene after she dies from lung cancer. While Don initially insists on retaking custody of his sons, and Sally believes that Henry is capable of raising the two boys alone, Betty opines that William and Judy look after them, as this will ensure the presence of a mother figure in their lives.

=== Hollis ===
Hollis (La Monde Byrd) is the black elevator operator in the Sterling Cooper building on Madison Avenue. He occasionally interacts with the Sterling Cooper staff. During the Season 1 episode "Red in the Face", Don pays Hollis to pretend the elevator is out of service in order to force Roger to climb the 23 flights of stairs to the office after an excessive lunch of oysters and martinis. Roger, having made the stairs, then meets the representatives of Richard Nixon's 1960 Presidential campaign in reception but vomits up his lunch on the floor due to the strain. He realizes that Don has exacted his revenge for making a pass at Betty, with Hollis's assistance.

His skin color becomes important on a number of occasions. In the Season 3 episode "The Fog", Pete tries to engage him in conversation about the product preferences of black people (for television brands), which Hollis is either uninterested in or sees as inappropriate. Pete, however, continues to push him by stopping the elevator and forcing Hollis to talk about the subject, knowing that Admiral television sets seem to sell well in "Negro markets". Hollis, while initially intimidated, is quick to respond to the issue of race, stating that, "We have bigger things to think about than TV". Pete is remorseful, but Hollis remains hardened.

Paul, too, addresses Hollis in an uncharacteristically familiar fashion, ostentatiously introducing Hollis to Paul's black girlfriend, Sheila, and telling Hollis to call him "Paul" instead of "Mr. Kinsey" in the Season 2 episode "The Inheritance". On the day that Marilyn Monroe's death is announced in the Season 2 episode "Six Month Leave", Hollis expresses sympathy for her ex-husband Joe DiMaggio, in contrast to many of Sterling Cooper's female characters who mourn Monroe's loss, and male characters (such as Roger), who appear emotionally unaffected.

=== Gail Holloway ===
Gail Holloway (Christine Estabrook) is Joan's mother, who comes to stay with Joan after Joan's son Kevin is born. She first appears in the Season 5 premiere "A Little Kiss" and remains as a recurring character through much of the season; she again appears in numerous Season 6 episodes, beginning with "To Have and to Hold", as well as the Season 7 episode "The Strategy". Gail is supportive of Joan, but their relationship is somewhat tense. She does not understand why Joan would want to return to work, thinking she should instead be content to be a full-time wife and mother, and she makes several disparaging comments to that effect. Joan, in turn, makes several references suggesting that Gail may have a drinking problem. Gail strikes up a flirtation with the apartment building's handyman, Apollo, of which Joan disapproves, until Apollo's wife forbids him to go to their apartment. Gail remains with Joan after Joan throws Greg out, but continues to be condescending about her daughter's job and failed marriage. She also frequently manipulates Joan's dependency on her to get her own way. In the Season 6 episode "To Have and to Hold", Gail surprises her daughter when she tells Joan's childhood friend Kate she is proud of her daughter having become a partner at a Madison Avenue firm. In "Man with a Plan", Gail advises Joan to accept Bob Benson's friendship (and possibly more), as not every act of kindness is a front. Gail remains with Joan, though mostly off-camera during the second half of Season 7, continuing to look at after Kevin while Joan works to establish her new company, Harris & Holloway; she appears briefly in the series finale "Person to Person", taking Kevin out to the park while Joan works from home.

=== John Hooker ===
John Hooker (Ryan Cartwright), an Englishman, is Lane Pryce's assistant during Season 3. His title is "secretary", but he insists his status is higher than that of the other secretaries at Sterling Cooper, telling Joan, "I'm Mr. Pryce's right arm; I'm not his typist." To this end, he asks that the switchboard operators address him as "Mr. Hooker" rather than "John". He assumes Joan's position as office manager after her departure to become a housewife. A variety of Sterling Cooper employees refer to John as "Moneypenny", much to his chagrin. His officious, self-important manner annoys nearly everyone in the office, particularly Joan; Lane and Rebecca Pryce call him a "toad". When the primary partners abandon the company to form Sterling Cooper Draper Pryce, John is left to deal with the Putnam, Powell & Lowe executives, who are infuriated.

=== Mack Johnson ===
Mack Johnson (Morgan Rusler) is Dick and Adam Whitman's father figure following Archie's death, whom Don called "Uncle Mack." In the aftermath of Archie's death, the Whitmans lost the family farm, and a pregnant Abigail Whitman took Dick to live with Mack and his wife, her sister. He first appears in the Season 1 episode "Babylon", in which Don flashes back to his brother's birth. In Season 6, it was revealed that Mack was the pimp of a brothel in Hershey, Pennsylvania. In the Season 6 finale, Don attempts to be more honest about his life and shows his children where he grew up. While Abigail was cruel and spiteful to Dick, Mack was described as being nice to him. However, he is shown to not intervene on Dick's behalf in stopping Abigail's abusive treatment. According to Adam, Mack died shortly after Abigail's death from stomach cancer.

=== Joy ===
Joy (Laura Ramsey) is a young woman Don meets in California in the Season 2 episode, "The Jet Set", for whom he impulsively abandons Pete and his business obligations. She belongs to a group of wealthy, sexually liberal, bohemian tax exiles who live lavishly and travel from place to place but display no work ethic or means of support. Both Joy and her father seem attracted to Don. One of their entourage is a "Doctor Feelgood" type, whom Don fends off to avoid receiving an injection of an unknown substance, after Don collapses by the pool and comes to on Joy's couch. When Don asks Joy about a book she is reading, she explains she had enrolled in a literature class while staying in Rhode Island, but "it was not for [her]". During a late night skinny dip with Joy, Don meets her brother, who is estranged from his wife, and his children, who are roughly the same ages as Don's, and Don offers them his and Joy's bedroom. Though enticed to join the group in their travels, Don declines.

=== Edna Keener ===
Dr. Edna Keener (Patricia Bethune) is a child psychiatrist whom Betty takes Sally to see when her behavior at home becomes too much for Betty to handle. Betty also has short sessions with Dr. Edna, ostensibly to discuss Sally, though Betty uses them to discuss her own psychiatric issues. After making progress with Sally, Dr. Edna recommends reducing Sally's number of sessions per week, to which Betty objects. Dr. Edna suggests that Betty seek some psychiatric help with an adult psychiatrist, but Betty elliptically convinces Dr. Edna to continue reserving time for Betty to "discuss Sally's progress" with her in the Season 4 episode "Blowing Smoke".

=== Gloria Massey ===
Gloria Hofstadt, née Massey (Darcy Shean), is Gene Hofstadt's second wife, whom her stepchildren Betty and William despise. Gloria tries to hide the extent of Gene's illness in Season 2. In Season 3, Gloria is not seen, but Betty's brother William discovers that Gloria, unable to deal with Gene's deteriorating condition and overall difficult demeanor, has left him and moved to Boca Raton.

=== John Mathis ===
John "Johnny" Mathis (Trevor Einhorn) is a copywriter at Sterling, Cooper & Partners, appearing in Seasons 6 and 7. Defensive about his work, he endangers an account with Peter Pan by interrupting a meeting. Late in Season 7, he goes to Don for help in putting together a difficult pitch, but when he tries to copy Don's off-the-cuff style and it goes disastrously wrong, he furiously blames Don for his failure and snarls that Don only gets by on looks, and makes an ugly reference to Lee Garner Jr. being sexually attracted to Don. In response, Don tells Mathis to own his failures and garbage-mouth and then fires him, leading a defiant Mathis to sneer that he was right about not apologizing to Don.

=== Guy MacKendrick ===
Guy MacKendrick (Jamie Thomas King) is a confident, handsome, charismatic accounts executive of London-based advertising firm Putnam, Powell, and Lowe. A Cambridge University and London School of Economics graduate, he was brought in by PPL to take over the Sterling Cooper Advertising Agency. St. John Powell and Harold Ford expressed much enthusiasm for him. During the office party held in the Season 3 episode "Guy Walks Into an Advertising Agency", Lois Sadler accidentally runs over MacKendrick's foot with a John Deere riding lawnmower. Joan Holloway saves his life by quickly placing a tourniquet on his leg; however, he ultimately loses his foot. Because of this disfigurement, Powell and Ford decide that MacKendrick has no future with the firm and fire him.

=== Carol McCardy ===
Carol McCardy (Kate Norby) works at a literary agency and is Joan Holloway's roommate in Season 1. One night, she musters the courage to confess to Joan that she has loved her since they met the first week in college, but Joan ignores her romantic advances in favor of not spoiling their friendship. She has moved out by the beginning of Season 2 and is not referred to again.

=== Daisy McClusky ===
Daisy McClusky (Danielle Panabaker) is a stewardess for Northwest Airlines. She has recurring sexual relationship with Roger Sterling in Season 6 and notifies him when potential clients are on her flights, even detaining those clients until Roger arrives. Daisy's assistance has its limits, however, as she will not do anything that actually harms business, such as bump SCDP's rivals from her flights altogether. However, she does arrange for the luggage of rival admen to be temporarily "lost".

=== Faye Miller ===
Dr. Faye Miller (Cara Buono) is a psychologist and consultant who provides market research for Sterling Cooper Draper Pryce. She meets Don the day of the 1964 office Christmas party in the Season 4 episode "Christmas Comes But Once a Year", and seems to immediately have multiple insights into Don's true character. She is a tough and independent "modern woman" whom Peggy admires. Although she wears a wedding ring, she admits to Don this is merely a ruse to ward off unwanted advances. She later shares that her father, "a handsome, two-bit gangster like [Don]", owns a candy store and has friends and "obligations" connected to the mob. Don, after initially denigrating her approach to advertising and overhearing her lambaste an estranged lover on the phone, during which she reveals she does not cook and does not want to clean up after him, takes an interest in her. Eventually, the two embark on a secret romantic relationship, during which time Don expresses admiration for her work. When Sally stows away on a train and a stranger brings her to Don's office, Faye reveals her discomfort with children and, although Sally liked her, her fear that she had failed some test as a result. Don later confides to Faye about his past as Dick Whitman and his fears the security clearance investigation Pete's defense industry client has ordered will expose him and lead to his arrest, to which Faye advises him to face the problem and come clean. Faye severs ties with SCDP after Don submits a full-page ad to The New York Times saying SCDP will no longer work with tobacco companies, as her firm continues to do so. He also convinces her to put her ethics aside and breach the "Chinese wall" to use her connections to try to get his struggling firm meetings with clients; her partner secures a meeting with a tobacco company, which falls through, and she secures a meeting with Heinz Beans, for whose advertising campaign Megan Calvet Draper and Peggy Olson ultimately win a Clio Award. While in a relationship with Faye, he begins a relationship with Megan, then impulsively becomes engaged to her, leading to him breaking off his relationship with Faye. She is extremely upset by the news and tells Don he "only like[s] the beginnings of things".

=== Katherine Olson ===
Katherine Olson (Myra Turley) is Peggy and Anita's mother. Peggy's relationship with her mother is strained, as Katherine does not understand Peggy's focus on her career rather than on finding a husband and has not forgiven her daughter for having a child out of wedlock. Old-fashioned and harsh, she disapproves of Peggy's decisions to move to Manhattan and later, to live with Abe. Not so much because of their religious differences, rather her nihilistic view that Abe's relationship with Peggy is merely practice for the real family he will someday have with someone else. She harshly tells her daughter that loneliness is no excuse for shacking up and to simply buy a series of cats for companionship until she dies. A devout Catholic, Katherine is vocally critical of Father Gill's style of preaching and informal grace at dinner during the Season 2 episode "Three Sundays".

=== Burt Peterson ===
Burt Peterson (Michael Gaston) is Head of Accounts at Sterling Cooper until 1963, when Roger Sterling fires him in the Season 3 premier "Out of Town" at Lane Pryce's instigation. Peterson reacts very negatively as he had recently been struggling with his wife's cancer treatments, which had caused PPL to delay firing him and lulling him into a false sense of security since he had survived the various waves of firings. He has a tantrum after his firing, sweeping the items on people's desks onto the floor, breaking them, and then throwing things around his own office, to the sounds of many crashes. At some point later, he becomes employed by CGC and mentions to Peggy that he is a widower. When SCDP and CGC merge, he is again fired by Roger in the Season 6 episode "Man With a Plan". Roger takes great pleasure in firing Burt again, due to the bridge-burning way Burt behaved the last time he was fired. Duck Phillips later tells Pete Campbell that he used his new job as a headhunter to find Burt a Senior Vice President position at the high-powered McCann Erickson advertising agency.

=== Phoebe ===
Phoebe (Nora Zehetner) is a nurse who lives down the hall from Don Draper's Greenwich Village apartment. She invites Don to her Christmas party and, later, when she finds him unsteadily trying to unlock his apartment door, she helps him to bed and fends off a pass from him. She confides that her father was also an alcoholic. Don hires her to watch Sally and Bobby one evening, when he is out with Bethany Van Nuys. Sally cuts her own hair while on Phoebe's watch, angering Don, who has to deal with the aftermath from Betty.

=== St. John Powell ===
St. John (pronounced "SIN-jin") Powell (Charles Shaughnessy) is the managing director of London advertising firm Putnam, Powell, and Lowe (PPL). In Season 2, Duck Phillips meets with Powell and Alec Martin, first to ask for a job and when he is rejected, to propose that PPL buy out Sterling Cooper. At that meeting, Powell goads Duck into drinking alcohol, breaking Duck's sobriety. Powell eventually makes an offer that is accepted. At the end of Season 2, Powell and Martin witness Duck's drunken rant against Don, which results in Duck being pushed out of Sterling Cooper. Powell is the architect of PPL's sale to McCann Erickson, keeping the information from Lane Pryce and the rest of the Sterling Cooper staff. Pryce fires Roger, Bertram Cooper and Don to void the non-compete clauses in their contracts, allow them to start their own agency and bring Pryce along as a fourth partner. A furious Powell fires Pryce for "lack of character" in the Season 3 finale "Shut the Door. Have a Seat.", playing into Pryce's hands.

=== Rebecca Pryce ===
Rebecca Pryce (Embeth Davidtz) is Lane Pryce's wife of 18 years. Born to an upper-class British family, she is stylish and polite, though a bit snobbish and self-involved. She follows Lane to New York in Season 3 but suffers the strain of culture shock, and by Season 4 she returns to London, with their son, Nigel, in tow. After a brief separation, and Lane's infidelity with a Black Playboy Bunny, they apparently smooth over their problems and Rebecca moves back to New York to reconcile. She is stunned by his suicide and combines her genuine grief over losing him and the general contempt she viewed him with when she angrily tells an apologetic Don that SCDP is at fault because they filled "a man like that with ambition". She also astutely realizes the US$50,000 check Don gives her, reimbursing Lane's partnership fee, is worth less than Lane's contributions to the firm, although she is unaware that SCDP actually got over $200,000 from insurance.

=== Robert Pryce ===
Robert Pryce (W. Morgan Sheppard) is Lane Pryce's stern father. Originally from a middle class British background, he is a retired surgical equipment supplier. He has a complicated love/hate relationship with his son, whom he dominates, sometimes by violence to make him "take action and sort his problems" to "put his house in order". Lane once described him to Don as "one of those alcoholics that thinks he's collecting".

=== Joyce Ramsay ===
Joyce Ramsay (Zosia Mamet) works as an assistant photo editor at Life magazine in the Time-Life Building, where Sterling Cooper Draper Pryce is located. Peggy meets her in the elevator in the Season 4 episode "The Rejected" and the two quickly become friends; Joyce introduces Peggy to the counter-culture scene of the early 1960s. Joyce is a lesbian and hangs out with a bohemian crowd, introducing Peggy to her eventual boyfriend Abe Drexler at a loft party in a sweatshop. She later engineers a meeting between Abe and Peggy; although the meeting ends badly, Peggy remains friends with Joyce. That summer, Joyce reunites Abe and Peggy by giving both a ride home from the beach in her crowded car.

=== Anita Olson Respola and Gerry Respola ===
Anita Olson Respola (Audrey Wasilewski) is Peggy's older sister. She is married to Gerry Respola (Jerry O'Donnell), who has a bad back, and has three young children. The youngest baby was born soon after Peggy's illegitimate child with Pete Campbell. Anita is sometimes judgmental and harsh, like her mother, and shares Katherine's anger about Peggy's pregnancy, although she is supportive of Peggy when Katherine reacts badly to news of Peggy's move to Manhattan. Anita reveals Peggy's secret to Father Gill while taking confession, out of anger at her sister's ability to move on.

=== Arnold Rosen ===
Dr. Arnold "Arnie" Rosen (Brian Markinson) is Sylvia's husband and Mitchell's father. He is a cardiac surgeon who lives in Don and Megan's building. Affable and conscientious, he and Don establish a relatively close friendship. When Arnie is trapped in Washington, DC during the riots following the assassination of Dr. Martin Luther King, Jr., a visibly distressed Don, who is having an affair with Arnie's wife Sylvia, tries to reach him several times. Arnold quits his job in New York when his hospital nixes plans for him to perform the first heart transplant in the United States. He is also a staunch patriot, having served in the Army in Korea during the Korean War, but acknowledges America's shaky status in the world during the late '60s. He references the Tet Offensive in Vietnam and the capture of the USS Pueblo by North Korea as the result of America not taking its enemies seriously, and cites Fidel Castro as the original example. He is a quietly heroic man, departing in the middle of the night on cross-country skis during a blizzard on New Year's Eve to get to his hospital to perform emergency surgery, and casually saving the life of their building's doorman after he has a heart attack. At the same time, his wife Sylvia feels he takes her for granted. In Season 7, Arnold runs into Don and his new love interest Diana on the elevator. He shares news that Mitchell received an honor from the New York Air National Guard, but then proceeds to say cutting and sarcastic remarks towards Don, subtly suggesting Sylvia told him about the affair.

=== Mitchell Rosen ===
Mitchell Rosen (Hudson Thames) is Arnold and Sylvia's son. He attends college in Michigan and is studying overseas in Paris during the 1968 student riots. When he rips up and sends back his draft card, he seems certain to be drafted, but Don arranges with Ted to get Mitchell into the New York Air National Guard to avoid him being sent to Vietnam.

=== Lois Sadler ===
Lois Sadler (Crista Flanagan) is a switchboard operator in Season 1 who has a crush on Sal Romano based on his phone conversations and voice. In Season 2, she becomes Don's secretary after Peggy is promoted to copywriter, but she is depicted as being incompetent. Don demotes her back to the switchboard in "The Benefactor" (S02E03), after she fails to cover for him when he is out of the office. In "Meditations in an Emergency" (S02E13), she agrees to give Harry, Paul, and Ken information about the upcoming merger with PPL that she has overheard in telephone conversations in exchange for being promoted to secretary again. In Season 3, she becomes Paul's secretary. In the episode "Guy Walks Into an Advertising Agency" (S03E06), she accidentally runs over the foot of Guy MacKendrick, a British executive who was poised to replace Lane as the head of Sterling Cooper, while drunkenly riding a lawn mower during an office party. Miraculously, she is not fired after this, as she is still seen as Paul's secretary in "The Color Blue" (S03E10). However, she is not seen in the new SCDP offices.

=== Scarlet ===
Scarlet (Sadie Alexandru) is Harry Crane's secretary, first appearing in Season 5. In spite of her slightly ditsy personality she is nonetheless competent, and Harry values her loyalty to him, as well as her rather sycophantic demeanor toward him. In the Season 6 episode "To Have and To Hold," she asks Dawn to commit time card fraud so Scarlet can buy a birthday present for one of the secretaries. Joan fires Scarlet when she discovers the fraud but Harry intervenes when a crying Scarlet passes him on her way out of the office, which causes a serious rift between Harry and Joan. A romantic relationship is hinted at between Scarlet and Harry, especially when Peggy requests a new secretary in "A Day's Work" and Joan replies that, "Scarlet and Harry are practically married."

=== Shirley ===
Shirley (Sola Bamis) is the only other black employee at SC&P, aside from Dawn. As a contrast to Dawn, Shirley is more self-assured and dresses in trendy minidresses and go-go boots. Nevertheless, she and Dawn are often mistaken for one another by the employees of SC&P, leading to their own inside joke of referring to the other by their own name. Shirley is originally assigned to Peggy's desk, following her from CGC. However, in Season 7's "A Day's Work," Peggy becomes embarrassed when she realizes she accidentally took Shirley's Valentine's Day bouquet and insists Shirley be reassigned to another desk. Joan initially places Shirley in reception but Bert insists Shirley be reassigned yet again because he does not want a black woman to be the face of SC&P. Shirley then becomes Lou Avery's secretary for the remainder of his time at SCDP. She later becomes Roger's second secretary, when his workload becomes too much for Caroline. In the Season 7 episode "Lost Horizon", she tells Roger that she has found a job as a secretary at a publishing house instead of going to McCann, and that "some people don't feel welcome in advertising." She tells Roger that she always found him amusing and he wishes her luck.

=== Danny Siegel ===
Danny Siegel (Danny Strong) is Jane Sterling's cousin, for whom Roger Sterling arranges an interview at SCDP in the Season 4 "Waldorf Stories". Don and Peggy find his book laughable and decide not to hire him. However, during a pitch meeting for Life cereal, Don drunkenly uses one of Danny's ideas, which the client loves. Peggy later calls Don out on what he did and persuades him to make things right, so he offers to pay Danny for the idea. Danny insists on having a job instead and Don reluctantly hires him.

Danny ends up generally fitting in well with the rest of the younger staffers, though he remains somewhat clueless. Danny is one of the first people let go from SCDP after it loses the Lucky Strike account, and Don and Peggy are visibly upset when they have to fire him in the Season 4 episode "Blowing Smoke". However, he takes the news gracefully and thanks them for the opportunity they had given him. Danny reappears at a party that Don and Roger attend in the Season 6 episode "A Tale of Two Cities", by which time he has become a major movie producer with a hippie persona and now prefers to be called "Daniel J. Siegel." Danny seems genuinely friendly, but Roger is gleefully rude and demeaning towards him. When Roger attempts to pick up Danny's hippie date Lotus, Danny becomes fed up. He punches Roger in the testicles and walks away with Lotus, leaving Roger humiliated.

=== "Smitty" Smith and Kurt Smith ===
"Smitty" Smith (Patrick Cavanaugh) and Kurt Smith (Edin Gali) are a young copywriter/artist team hired by Don at the beginning of Season 2 to target the youth demographic.

"Smitty" is American, and often explains the complexities of American culture to Kurt. Smitty is aware of Kurt's homosexuality and although he tries to caution Kurt from coming out at work, he defends Kurt from the rest of the staff's homophobia in "The Jet Set." In "My Old Kentucky Home," Smitty mentions having graduated from the University of Michigan and he eagerly joins in the smoking of marijuana to help come up with ideas for the Bacardi account.

Kurt is German and is openly gay, which causes quite a stir in the office when he casually reveals as such in order to dispel the assumption that he and Peggy are dating. Nevertheless, he is still friendly with Peggy and arranges to take her to a Bob Dylan concert. When Peggy complains to Kurt that she always picks the wrong guys, he advises Peggy to adopt a trendier appearance and provides her with a new trademark hairstyle.

When SCDP is formed, the partners do not ask Smitty or Kurt to come with them. Later, Smitty is seen working for rival advertising company CGC in Season 4, implying that Kurt is working there as well. At CGC, Smitty speaks glowingly of Don Draper when asked to describe him, which makes Ted Chaough envious. The two are not seen after SCDP and CGC merge.

=== Mona Sterling Pike ===
Mona Sterling Pike (Talia Balsam) is Roger Sterling's first wife and the mother of his daughter, Margaret. During their marriage, it is not clear whether Mona is aware of Roger's multiple infidelities. In Season 1, Mona cares for Roger as he recovers from his heart attack and when he suffers a second heart attack in a client meeting, she berates Bert Cooper for prioritizing a client over Roger's health. Despite her devotion to Roger, he later leaves her for Jane Siegel. In "Six Month Leave," she goes to the Sterling Cooper offices and angrily blames Don for encouraging Roger to divorce her. Roger and Mona seem to be on good terms in Season 3 after their divorce as they try to help Margaret's anxieties over her wedding; Mona even advocates for Margaret to accept Jane as a step-mother. In Season 5, Mona helps Roger get a meeting with Ed Baxter from Corning Inc., noting that he still supports Mona and their daughter. In the Season 6 premiere The Doorway, Roger gets angry when he sees Mona's new husband, Bruce Pike, at Roger's mother's memorial service but the two reconcile in Season 7s "The Monolith", when they to try to bring Margaret home after she had run off to become a hippie. Mona quickly gives up while Roger stays the night and attempts to understand Margaret. Mona is last seen watching the 1969 Moon landing with Roger and their grandson Ellery.

=== Bethany Van Nuys ===
Bethany Van Nuys (Anna Camp) is a friend of Jane Sterling's who resembles Betty Draper. On their first date in the Season 4 premiere, she explains that she is an actress and is working as a supernumerary at the Metropolitan Opera. Don dates her periodically throughout season 4, but she notes that he does not seem particularly interested in her. In "The Summer Man", they run into Betty at a restaurant and Bethany seems pleased with Betty's jealousy. Later, Bethany performs oral sex on Don in the taxi ride back to her apartment and promises, "To be continued." In his journal, Don writes that he believes that was a rehearsed line; he continues, "She's a sweet girl, and she wants me to know her, but I already do. People tell you who they are but we ignore it, because we want them to be who we want them to be." He stops seeing her in favor of Dr. Faye Miller. At the end of Season 4, Bethany is mentioned again when Don tells Betty he is getting remarried; Betty assumes his new fiancée is Bethany.

=== Tom and Jeannie Vogel ===
Thomas and Jeannie Vogel (Joe O'Connor and Sheila Shaw) are Trudy Campbell's parents. Tom is an executive at Vicks Chemical, who uses his status as an important client with Sterling Cooper to wield influence over Trudy's marriage to Pete Campbell. In Season 1, he helps Pete and Trudy buy an apartment, much to Pete's chagrin. Tom also offers to give Sterling Cooper the Clearasil account if Pete agrees to have a baby soon. In Season 2, after Trudy and Pete learn that they have fertility problems, Tom pressures Pete to agree to adopt a child. When Pete refuses, Tom cancels the Clearasil account. At the end of Season 3, Pete gets the account back with Trudy's help. In Season 4, the agency drops Clearasil because of a conflict with Pond's Cold Cream, but Pete is able to manipulate Tom into giving him several larger accounts from Tom's company. In Season 6, after Tom and Pete unexpectedly meet in a brothel, Tom pulls his company's accounts in hypocritical disgust at Pete's infidelity to Trudy. In season 7, it is revealed that Tom has suffered a heart attack.

=== Arnold Wayne ===
Dr. Arnold Wayne (Andy Umberger) is Betty's psychiatrist during the first season, who she began seeing because of her problem with her hands going numb unexpectedly in the wake of her mother's death. While she is seeing him, Dr. Wayne is secretly in contact with Don to discuss her sessions, which Betty finds out about in the Season 1 finale. She uses that to her advantage by confiding in Dr. Wayne her anger at Don's infidelity, knowing that the doctor will report the session to Don.

=== Abigail Whitman ===
Abigail Whitman (Brynn Horrocks) is the stepmother of Dick Whitman and the mother of Adam Whitman. She was married to Archie Whitman and had recently miscarried when a midwife gave her Dick, the child of Archie and the prostitute Evangeline, to raise. However, Abigail resented Dick and regularly referred to him as a "whore's son." Don hated Abigail in return; in Season 1's "5G", when Adam tells Don that Abigail has died, Don's response is, "Good."

After Archie died, Abigail lost the family farm during the Great Depression and she, pregnant with Adam, traveled with Dick to stay with her sister and her sister's husband, "Uncle Mack" in Pennsylvania. Uncle Mack ran a whorehouse and Abigail had to make herself sexually available to him. Abigail disliked staying at the whorehouse and told Dick to keep away from the women. In Season 6's "The Crash," Don recalls being sick as a teenager and Abigail claiming he had tuberculosis and ordering him to the basement. When Aimée takes pity on Don, she notes that Abigail does not know how to take care of anybody. When Aimée is evicted and she reveals that she had taken Dick's virginity, Abigail beats Dick severely with a wooden spoon while berating him, calling him filthy.

=== Adam Whitman ===
Adam Whitman (Jay Paulson) is Dick Whitman's half-brother, the son of Abigail and Archie Whitman. In the Season 1's "5G", an adult Adam tracks Don down after seeing his picture in Advertising Age. He is a janitor working in New York City and is overjoyed to find Don alive. Initially unwilling to associate with Adam, Don agrees to meet him for lunch where Adam updates Don on their family and tries to learn more about Don's life. Don later visits Adam at his single room occupancy rooming house to give Adam $5,000 and to tell him to never contact Don again. Adam is devastated. Later, Adam mails a package to Don that contains old family photos and soon afterward, hangs himself. The box of photos later causes Don trouble when it is found by Pete Campbell, who attempts to use the photos to blackmail Don about his true identity. Don then attempts to reach Adam, but learns that he has died and didn't spend any of the money Don had given him. Don feels guilty about the way he treated Adam.

In Season 1's "Nixon vs. Kennedy," a flashback reveals that as a boy, Adam saw Don on the train that brought back the body of "Dick Whitman" (actually that of the real Don Draper's). He attempts to tell his mother and Uncle Mack but they think Adam is imagining things. In Season 5's "The Phantom", Don sees an employee around the office building who looks like Adam and when he finally goes into for a dental procedure involving anesthesia, he hallucinates Adam standing over him, his neck bruised from his hanging, stating, "It's not your tooth that's rotten." When Don asks Adam not to leave him, Adam smiles and tells him he will be "hanging around."

=== Archie Whitman ===
Archibald "Archie" Whitman (Joseph Culp) was a farmer in rural Illinois and the father of Dick and Adam Whitman. He impregnated Evangeline, a prostitute, who died while giving birth to Dick. The midwife then brought the newborn Dick to Archie and his wife, Abigail, since she knew Abigail had recently miscarried. Archie is depicted as a mean-spirited alcoholic; in Season 1's "The Hobo Code", Archie refuses to compensate a drifter for labor performed around the farm and in Season 2's "Three Sundays," Don tells Betty that his father would "beat the hell out of [him]" so badly that Don would fantasize about ways to kill him. In Season 3's "Shut the Door. Have a Seat." Don recalls sitting in with Archie during a farmer's meeting. Archie went against all of his neighbors and refused to join them in selling his crops at the same price, despite the group having previously agreed to act in unison. Later that night, a drunken Archie set out to find a buyer for his crops and was kicked in the face by his horse during a storm. He was instantly killed as a stunned Dick looked on.
