= Mad Men season 4 =

Season of television series

Mad Men
- Season 4
- Season 4 promotional poster
- Starring: Jon Hamm; Elisabeth Moss; Vincent Kartheiser; January Jones; Christina Hendricks; Jared Harris; Aaron Staton; Rich Sommer; Kiernan Shipka; Robert Morse; John Slattery
- No. of episodes: 13

Release
- Original network: AMC
- Original release: July 25 – October 17, 2010

Season chronology
- ← Previous; Season 3 Next → Season 5

The fourth season of the American television drama series Mad Men premiered on July 25, 2010, and concluded on October 17, 2010. It consisted of thirteen episodes, each running approximately 48 minutes in length. AMC broadcast the fourth season on Sundays at 10:00 pm in the United States.

Season four takes place between November 1964 and October 1965. It is set at the new and considerably more modern advertising agency, Sterling Cooper Draper Pryce. The main narrative of the fourth season is driven by Don Draper's identity crisis. As Don falls deeper into existential despair, he begins regularly meeting with prostitutes and faces debilitating alcoholism.

The fourth season of Mad Men was widely commended by television critics, who viewed it as continuing the show's excellence in all areas of production while still emphasizing strong character development. Its seventh episode ("The Suitcase") garnered particularly strong praise. The season received the Primetime Emmy Award for Outstanding Drama Series and recognition from the American Film Institute for the show's fourth year in a row. According to year-end lists collected by Metacritic, the fourth season of Mad Men was the most acclaimed show of 2010.

== Cast ==
=== Main cast ===
- Jon Hamm as Don Draper
- Elisabeth Moss as Peggy Olson
- Vincent Kartheiser as Pete Campbell
- January Jones as Betty Francis
- Christina Hendricks as Joan Harris
- Jared Harris as Lane Pryce
- Aaron Staton as Ken Cosgrove
- Rich Sommer as Harry Crane
- Kiernan Shipka as Sally Draper
- Robert Morse as Bert Cooper
- John Slattery as Roger Sterling

=== Recurring cast ===
- Cara Buono as Faye Miller
- Jessica Paré as Megan Calvet
- Christopher Stanley as Henry Francis
- Matt Long as Joey Baird
- Jay R. Ferguson as Stan Rizzo
- Jared S. Gilmore as Bobby Draper
- Randee Heller as Ida Blankenship
- Alison Brie as Trudy Campbell
- Beth Hall as Caroline
- Alexa Alemanni as Allison
- Zosia Mamet as Joyce Ramsay
- Kevin Rahm as Ted Chaough
- Danny Strong as Danny Siegel
- Anna Camp as Bethany Van Nuys
- Charlie Hofheimer as Abe Drexler
- Deborah Lacey as Carla
- Caity Lotz as Stephanie Horton
- Joel Murray as Freddy Rumsen
- Samuel Page as Greg Harris
- Marten Holden Weiner as Glen Bishop
- Melinda Page Hamilton as Anna Draper
- Peyton List as Jane Sterling
- Mark Moses as Herman "Duck" Phillips
- Joe O'Connor as Tom Vogel
- Darren Pettie as Lee Garner, Jr.

=== Guest stars ===
- Patrick Cavanaugh as "Smitty" Smith
- Rosemarie DeWitt as Midge Daniels
- Anne Dudek as Francine Hanson
- Laura Regan as Jennifer Crane
- Myra Turley as Katherine Olson
- Audrey Wasilewski as Anita Olson Respola
- Ray Wise as Ed Baxter

== Plot ==
The main narrative of the fourth season is driven by Don Draper's identity crisis after the dissolution of his marriage to Betty. As Don falls deeper into existential despair, his alcoholism worsens and he begins regularly meeting with prostitutes. Don travels to California to see Anna and meets her niece, Stephanie, who tearfully tells Don that Anna is dying of cancer, a fact her family has hidden from Anna thus far. Don, unable to spend time with Anna knowing she is going to die, tells her he will return to California soon with his kids, knowing that it's a lie. Meanwhile, Sally struggles to cope with her parents' divorce, and Betty and Henry send her to a child psychologist to address Sally's erratic behavior. The psychologist offers comfort to Sally, but additionally spends a significant amount of time analyzing Betty.

Pete and Peggy continue down different cultural paths; Pete accepts fatherhood when Trudy gives birth to a baby girl, while Peggy makes friends with a group of beatniks, including Abe, a liberal writer whom she starts to date. Peggy's relationship with Don becomes frayed after Don wins a prestigious award for a commercial whose success largely depended on Peggy. The tension comes to a head when Don forces Peggy to stay late in the office, causing her to miss her own surprise birthday party. Nevertheless, the two reconcile and have an intimate discussion about their lives. That night, Don falls asleep in Peggy's lap and experiences a vision of Anna carrying a suitcase. Having received an urgent message from Stephanie the day prior, Don returns the call after waking up and discovers that Anna has died. Peggy comforts Don, and the two hold hands in an act of friendship.

After Anna's death, Don cuts down on his drinking and becomes increasingly introspective. He asks Faye Miller, a consultant at Sterling Cooper Draper Pryce (SCDP), out on a formal date. Around the same time, Roger and Joan have sex after getting mugged in a poor neighborhood. Joan becomes pregnant and decides to pass the child off as Greg's rather than take Roger's money for an abortion.

At SCDP, Roger loses the Lucky Strike account, putting the financial security of the entire company in jeopardy. When SCDP lands a contract with North American Aviation, FBI agents come to the Francis home for a routine security clearance. Don is rattled and forces Pete to drop the aforementioned client, while Faye advises Don to come clean about his past to the authorities rather than continue living in fear. Don later discovers that his former mistress, Midge Daniels, is in the throes of heroin addiction. In order to put a positive spin on being dropped from Lucky Strike (and deeply rattled by Midge's inner destruction), Don places a full-page ad in The New York Times proclaiming that SCDP will no longer do business with Big Tobacco. The sensational move does not go over well with their partners, except Don's assistant Megan, who admires it.

In October 1965, Don takes his kids on a trip to California, and brings Megan to look after them after Betty abruptly fires the family nanny. They visit Stephanie at Anna Draper's former home; Sally notices a message painted on the wall ("Dick + Anna '64") and asks Don who Dick is, leading Don to admit that it refers to him, though he elides the longer story by calling it a nickname. Over the course of the weekend, Don decides that he is in love with Megan and proposes to her on their return.

Peggy and Ken help to save the company by signing new work with Topaz Pantyhose. Betty and Henry move out of the Drapers' Ossining home after Betty fails to break up the budding friendship between Sally and Glen, an unruly neighborhood boy. Don announces the news of his engagement to Megan to the office and breaks up with Faye, who is left in tears. Don returns to the Draper home one last time to say goodbye to Betty, who shows signs of regret for the ending of their marriage as they leave their former home for the last time. The season closes with Don lying awake with Megan, looking out the window.

== Episodes ==
No. overall	No. in season	Title	Directed by	Written by	Original release date	US viewers (millions)
40	1	"Public Relations"	Phil Abraham	Matthew Weiner	July 25, 2010	2.92
Don's secretive demeanor results in an unfavorable interview by an Advertising Age reporter, and Horace fires the agency because Don did not mention him in his interview. Pete and Peggy work together to secure an increased budget from the Sugarberry Ham account, devising an ill-advised publicity stunt involving two women fighting over a baked ham. The plan goes awry when the fight turns real, and Peggy has to ask Don for bail and hush money. Roger attempts to find a girlfriend for Don, setting him up with Jane's friend Bethany. Betty and the kids spend Thanksgiving 1964 with Henry's family; Henry's mother disapproves of Betty, observing that her children are clearly scared of her. Betty gets into a fight with Don over her delay in moving out of the house. Don struggles with a bathing suit account, for which the client wants to project a wholesome image. When the representatives reject Don's pitch as overly risqué, an exasperated Don throws the men out of the room. He agrees to do an interview with The Wall Street Journal, telling the journalist about how he instigated the formation of Sterling Cooper Draper Pryce (SCDP) by having Lane fire them.
41	2	"Christmas Comes But Once a Year"	Michael Uppendahl	Tracy McMillan and Matthew Weiner	August 1, 2010	2.47
The office holds a meeting led by Dr. Faye Miller, a newly-hired psychiatrist and consultant who provides market research for the company. Faye confronts Don for leaving the meeting early, and declines his offer to go out for dinner. Don gets a Christmas letter from Sally expressing her desire for him to be present in their home on Christmas morning. Sally commiserates to Glen about Don's absence in her home; Glen later breaks into the Francis home and vandalizes it, but leaves Sally's room untouched. Peggy's boyfriend, Mark, urges her to have sex with him, but she puts him off. Now 18 months sober, Freddy Rumsen turns up at SCDP and provides the client Pond's Cold Cream in exchange for a job. After seeking advice from Freddy, Peggy decides to have sex with Mark, who believes that he has taken her virginity. Roger mistakenly invites Lee Garner, Jr. to the firm's Christmas party, forcing Lane to expand the party's budget beyond their means. Don has a drunken one-night stand with his secretary, Allison, but later hints that they are to pretend the encounter never happened, leaving her rejected and hurt.
42	3	"The Good News"	Jennifer Getzinger	Jonathan Abrahams and Matthew Weiner	August 8, 2010	2.22
Joan is trying to start a family with Greg, but her work schedule and his impending Army commitments make the timing difficult. Lane brusquely refuses Joan's request for time off in early January, since Greg is on duty over Christmas. Later, Joan is highly provoked to receive roses from Lane; he assures her the note was intended for his wife, and suspects that his secretary mixed up the cards, leading Joan to fire Lane's secretary. Don takes a New Year's trip to California to see Anna and meets her niece Stephanie. Stephanie reveals to Don that Anna has cancer, but does not know it. Upon being confronted by Don, Anna's sister Patty discloses that they have already consulted experts who collectively agree the cancer is terminal and advanced. Patty also asks Don to leave before he inadvertently tells Anna about her diagnosis. Returning to New York, Don enters the office and encounters Lane, who reveals that his wife has left him. They spend a night on the town to get their minds off their troubles. The episode ends with a partners meeting to begin 1965.
43	4	"The Rejected"	John Slattery	Keith Huff and Matthew Weiner	August 15, 2010	2.05
In February 1965, the creative team continues to work on the Pond's Cold Cream account. As Clearasil is Pond's main competition, Roger orders Pete to tell his father-in-law that SCDP needs to drop the Clearasil account due to the conflict of interest. Pete arranges a meeting with his father-in-law to reveal the news, only to discover from him that Trudy is pregnant. Pete later convinces his father-in-law to give him the entire Vicks Chemical account, while transferring Clearasil to another agency. A focus group for Pond's leads to a confrontation between Don and Allison, the latter of whom decides to quit. Joan punishes Don for the affair by hiring Bert's former secretary Ida Blankenship, a much older and blunt woman, as Don's new secretary. Faye announces the results of the Pond's focus group to Don, who is skeptical about Faye's psychological approach and dismisses her role in the creative process as useless and intrusive. Peggy begins a friendship with Joyce, an employee of Life magazine who works in the building. Peggy meets Joyce's friends and takes a liking to Abe Drexler, an underground newspaper writer. Upon learning of the news of Pete's upcoming fatherhood, Peggy awkwardly congratulates him.
44	5	"The Chrysanthemum and the Sword"	Lesli Linka Glatter	Erin Levy	August 22, 2010	2.19
Pete enters SCDP into a competition run by Honda, earning the ire of Roger who, due to his World War II experiences, refuses to do business with the Japanese. Upon learning that the other partners have secretly planned a meeting, Roger sabotages it by insulting the Honda representatives to their faces. Sally's erratic behavior, including cutting her own hair and masturbating, disturbs Betty and Henry, who seek a child psychiatrist over Don's objections. The psychiatrist, Dr. Edna, sets up sessions for Sally four days a week, and also encourages Betty to see a therapist of her own. Meanwhile, Ted Chaough, the creative director of Cutler, Gleason, and Chaough (CGC), attempts to position himself as Don's rival. Don conceives of a plan wherein SCDP will pretend to shoot a lavish Honda commercial, allowing details of the shoot to leak to Ted, who attempts to outdo SCDP's ad. Don then tells the Honda executives that he is withdrawing SCDP from consideration, because Honda had entertained a bid from CGC that broke the rules with a finished ad. The Honda representatives are impressed, and Pete and Lane inform Don that SCDP now has a shot at Honda's automobile account.
45	6	"Waldorf Stories"	Scott Hornbacher	Brett Johnson and Matthew Weiner	August 29, 2010	2.04
After winning a Clio Award for the Glo-Coat ad, an inebriated Don attends a meeting with Quaker Oats executives and inadvertently pitches a slogan for Life cereal that came from Jane's dimwitted cousin Danny, who had applied for a job. After Peggy persuades him to make things right, Don attempts to buy the slogan from Danny, but he refuses the money and insists on having a job, forcing Don to hire him. Peggy secludes herself in a hotel room with the firm's new artistic director Stan Rizzo in order to complete a campaign. Pete is upset to learn that Lane has hired Ken to join SCDP. He ultimately agrees to accept Ken's hiring, on the condition that Ken pays due respect to Pete's rank at SCDP. Roger dictates his memoirs and recounts how he met Don as a fur salesman in 1953. In flashbacks, Don discovers that Roger works in advertising and hounds him for a job at Sterling Cooper. Despite trying to blow him off, Roger agrees to go out with him for drinks. The next day, Don arrives at the lobby and claims that Roger had hired him; a puzzled Roger has no memory of what really happened.
46	7	"The Suitcase"	Jennifer Getzinger	Matthew Weiner	September 5, 2010	2.17
Duck calls Peggy to offer her a job at the agency he intends to start, but she turns him down. Facing an impending deadline for the Samsonite account, Don forces Peggy to stay late to work on the campaign, causing her to miss a birthday dinner with Mark, who has invited her family as a surprise. When Peggy calls Mark to cancel a second time, an infuriated Mark breaks up with her over the phone. Peggy lambasts Don for being unappreciative of her work and leaves in tears. Don calls her back into his office and they reconcile. Over dinner and drinks, the two intimately discuss their lives. Returning to SCDP, Duck arrives and drunkenly accuses Peggy of being "just another whore"; Peggy gets rid of Duck and reveals their past affair to Don. Don falls asleep in Peggy's lap and experiences a vision of Anna smiling with a suitcase. The following morning, Don calls Stephanie and discovers that Anna has died, causing him to break down in front of Peggy. Later that morning, Don informs Peggy of his new idea for the campaign; she reassures him that it is good, and the two exchange meaningful looks before she leaves.
47	8	"The Summer Man"	Phil Abraham	Lisa Albert & Janet Leahy and Matthew Weiner	September 12, 2010	2.31
Following Anna's death, Don attempts to regain control over his life through physical changes and journal writing, while Betty forbids him from attending Eugene's birthday party. After clashing with Joan in the office, freelance artist Joey Baird draws an obscene cartoon of Joan giving Lane fellatio and tapes it to her office window. Peggy is personally offended and informs Don, who tells her to fire Joey herself. When Joey refuses to apologize, Peggy fires him; Joan is upset with Peggy for firing Joey on her behalf, as it reinforces the stereotype that working women are frivolous and vindictive. Betty is flustered when she and Henry run into Don and Bethany on a date, infuriating Henry, who questions whether Betty is still in love with Don. The next morning, Betty apologizes, explaining that Don was the only other man she had ever been with. Despite Bethany's insistence on moving their relationship forward, Don ends up pursuing Faye, resulting in an impromptu dinner date during which the two bond. Don arrives at the Francis household to attend Eugene's birthday party, despite not being invited; Betty stops Henry from confronting Don, reasoning "we have everything".
48	9	"The Beautiful Girls"	Michael Uppendahl	Dahvi Waller and Matthew Weiner	September 19, 2010	2.30
At SCDP, the elderly Miss Blankenship dies at her desk while Don is meeting with Fillmore Auto Parts, leaving the grief-stricken employees to quietly remove her corpse without distracting the Fillmore clients. After learning that Greg is being shipped off to Vietnam, Roger and Joan go to a diner to commiserate with each other. While walking on Broadway, Roger and Joan are mugged at gunpoint; Roger calms Joan in an alleyway, and the two have sex. At a local bar, Peggy engages in conversation about race and feminism with Abe, but she angrily leaves when Abe reacts dismissively to her assertions that women have it as bad as African-Americans. The next day, Abe arrives at SCDP with an article he has written about corporate injustice towards women; Peggy is enraged, as the article could get her fired. Don and Faye's burgeoning relationship is tested when Sally runs away from home and turns up at the office. Don asks Faye to handle Sally when Betty refuses to pick her up; Faye lambasts Don for pushing her into a high-pressure situation with his daughter. When Betty finally arrives, Sally refuses to go home until she is comforted by Megan, Don's new secretary.
49	10	"Hands and Knees"	Lynn Shelton	Jonathan Abrahams and Matthew Weiner	September 26, 2010	2.12
After SCDP lands a contract with North American Aviation, FBI agents visit the Francis home as part of the security clearance process. Betty lies to the agents to protect Don's secret, while Don panics over having signed the application form Megan filled out, unaware that it contained lies that could potentially compromise his identity. After consulting with a friend from the Department of Defense, Pete tells Don that ending the account with North American Aviation will end the investigation; Don orders Pete to kill the account, which Pete reluctantly does, even though it is worth $4 million. Joan finds out that she is pregnant with Roger's child; Roger helps her set up an abortion, but Joan insists that Roger not come since they should not be seen together. Lane's father is displeased when Lane expresses his feelings for a Playboy Bunny waitress, and demands his son return to London to reconcile with Rebecca. Lee Garner, Jr. tells Roger that Lucky Strike is planning to terminate its contract with SCDP, ending their 30-year history together; Roger begs Lee to give them 30 days before moving to get their affairs in order, and intends to hide the loss from the other partners.
50	11	"Chinese Wall"	Phil Abraham	Erin Levy	October 3, 2010	2.06
When word leaks of Lucky Strike's defection to BBDO, Don charges the employees of SCDP to protect their existing businesses, as well as attempt to find new clients. Roger, who has been hiding the loss, fakes an angry phone call to Lee, and lies to the rest of the firm about going to Raleigh to try to win back the account. In the midst of the turmoil, Roger turns to Joan for comfort; she admonishes Roger that they cannot resume their affair. Stan kisses Peggy, who is nervous about her upcoming meeting with Playtex; Peggy tells Stan that Abe, whom she has had sex with, is her boyfriend. While waiting for Trudy to give birth to their daughter, Pete is wooed by Ted Chaough at CGC. Megan shows interest in both Don and the advertising business, and opens up to Don about her early life, revealing that she came to New York to be an actress. They proceed to have sex in Don's office. Roger returns to the office, claiming that Lucky Strike has defected as part of American Tobacco's cost-saving consolidation of accounts. Although some clients jump ship, such as Glo-Coat, most clients ultimately decide to stay at SCDP.
51	12	"Blowing Smoke"	John Slattery	Andre Jacquemetton & Maria Jacquemetton	October 10, 2010	2.23
Layoffs begin in the wake of the agency's financial troubles, reducing the staff by about 50%. Pete worries about his future at the agency when he is asked to contribute $50,000 to keep the agency afloat, but Trudy blocks him from borrowing the money. After running into his old flame Midge, Don has dinner with Midge and her husband Harry, who implies that Midge had tracked Don down. Midge asks Don for money, confessing that she and her husband are heroin addicts; Don gives her $120 and leaves. Betty is angered to learn that Sally and Glen have been talking in private, and she suggests to Henry that they move to another town. After executives from Philip Morris cancel a meeting for potential business, Don has a full-page ad printed in the New York Times announcing the firm will no longer represent tobacco companies, incensing the other partners and causing Bert to resign in protest. SCDP receives a call from the American Cancer Society about launching an anti-cigarette campaign. Faye informs Don that she must resign from SCDP, because her boss wants to continue working with tobacco clients, but points out that she and Don can now date openly.
52	13	"Tomorrowland"	Matthew Weiner	Jonathan Igla and Matthew Weiner	October 17, 2010	2.44
In October 1965, as Betty and Henry plan to move to the nearby town of Rye, Don arranges to take his kids with him on a business trip to California. The family maid, Carla, allows Glen to say goodbye to Sally; Betty is incensed and fires Carla, leading Don to ask Megan to accompany his children in California while he attends to business. Henry lambasts Betty for firing Carla, pointing out that she was important for the children's stability. Peggy and Ken sign an account with Topaz Pantyhose, bringing the agency back from the brink of collapse. Joan speaks with Greg over the phone about her pregnancy, revealing that she did not have an abortion. In California, Don takes the kids to visit Anna's home, and Stephanie gives Don the engagement ring that Anna had received from the real Don Draper. Impressed by Megan's relationship with the kids, Don proposes marriage; Megan accepts, and Don later calls Faye to end their relationship. Don has a meeting scheduled with a real estate agent at the old house in Ossining and Betty contrives to be there before the agent arrives so that she can see Don. She intimates that she regrets having married Henry, but Don tells her that he is engaged to Megan. Betty gives Don her key to the house.

== Production ==
=== Crew ===
Series creator Matthew Weiner also served as showrunner and executive producer, and is credited as a writer on 10 of the 13 episodes of the season, often co-writing the episodes with another writer. Lisa Albert became consulting producer and co-wrote one episode. Writing team Andre Jacquemetton and Maria Jacquemetton were promoted to co-executive producers and co-wrote one episode together. Erin Levy was promoted to staff writer and wrote two episodes. Dahvi Waller was promoted to producer and wrote one episode. Brett Johnson was promoted to staff writer and wrote one episode. New writers in the fourth season included consulting producer Janet Leahy, who co-wrote one episode; producer Jonathan Abrahams, who wrote two episodes; co-producer Keith Huff, who co-wrote one episode; and freelance writers Tracy McMillan and Jonathan Igla, who each co-wrote one episode. Other producers included Blake McCormick, Dwayne Shattuck, and executive producer Scott Hornbacher.

Phil Abraham directed the most episodes of the season with three, while Jennifer Getzinger, Michael Uppendahl, and series star John Slattery each directed two. The remaining episodes were directed by Lesli Linka Glatter, Scott Hornbacher, Lynn Shelton, and Matthew Weiner, who directs each season finale.

== Reception ==
=== Critical reception ===
The fourth season of Mad Men received widespread critical acclaim. Review aggregator Rotten Tomatoes reports that 95% of 37 critics have given the season a positive review with an average score of 9.5/10. The site's consensus is: "While Mad Men continues to darken in tone, it remains one of the most provocative, intelligent shows on television." On Metacritic, the fourth season scored 92 out of 100 based on 30 reviews, indicating universal acclaim; it has the highest score of all Mad Men seasons.

Robert Bianco of USA Today said that the series was "adept at changing course without diminishing its appeal or fundamentally altering its core". Maureen Ryan said that "the season was really, in the end, all about who Don Draper was and what he felt comfortable sharing, if not in interviews, in life. And it was hard not to root for Don once he'd found happiness", yet noted that season 4 was strong because of the focus on Sterling Cooper Draper Pryce. She also said that "The season began with a reporter asking, "Who is Don Draper?" He is, if nothing else, loved. And that's a far cry from the man we met in season 1, who wasn't truly known by anyone, except perhaps Anna."

Alan Sepinwall of HitFix felt that the fourth season was one of the strongest years, saying "this was a very different season for the show, but no less compelling. If anything, that off-kilter quality led to some of the show's best episodes ever, like "The Suitcase". Mad Men seasons often seem to need a handful of episodes to ramp up, but here all we really needed was the expository premiere, and we were off to the races after that. Great show. Great season." The A.V. Club writer Keith Phipps considered it the best season of the series so far, noting that "Matthew Weiner knows every rule of creating tense, dramatic story arcs and then willfully ignores them. Happily, his subversive tendencies have their own sort of satisfaction." Keith also observed that the best episodes of the season were light on plot, praising the "ruminative depth" of "mood pieces" like "The Good News" and "The Suitcase".

James Poniewozik of Time magazine said that Season 4 was the second-best season, slotting in just behind the first season, saying that "I think that a season that started strong—and had, through its middle, perhaps its best run of episodes ever—seemed to lose a bit of focus and momentum in its last third." Heather Havrilesky of Salon said that during the fourth season, "The central identity parable of Mad Men, which seemed like a simple act of deception in the first few seasons, has deepened into something richer and more ominous. Don Draper reflects the American compulsion to sidestep the hard work of living a flawed but authentic life for the empty illusion of perfection, as shiny and skin-deep as an advertisement that promises the impossible."

Eric Deggans of the Tampa Bay Times said that "I have been told by much more accomplished storytellers than myself that this season was among the series' best. But I have been deeply ambivalent about the episodes". Deggans also criticized the lack of focus on race, as well as the show's attempts at unpredictability, comparing it to The Sopranos. He did, however, praise the character development of Peggy Olson.

=== Accolades ===
The fourth season was celebrated with 19 nominations at the 63rd Primetime Emmy Awards (the most nominations the series has ever received from the Emmys), as well as many other industry honors. The series won the award for Outstanding Drama Series for the fourth year in a row, tying with L.A. Law, Hill Street Blues, and The West Wing for most wins in the category.

Jon Hamm was once again nominated for Outstanding Lead Actor in a Drama Series, while Elisabeth Moss was nominated for Outstanding Lead Actress in a Drama Series. John Slattery was honored with a nomination for Outstanding Supporting Actor in a Drama Series. Christina Hendricks' performance was recognized with a nomination for Outstanding Supporting Actress in a Drama Series. Robert Morse received yet another nomination for Outstanding Guest Actor in a Drama Series for his work as Bert Cooper. In addition, Cara Buono (Faye Miller) and Randee Heller (Ida Blankenship) were nominated for Outstanding Guest Actress in a Drama Series. Andre Jacquemetton and Maria Jacquemetton were nominated for Outstanding Writing for a Drama Series for "Blowing Smoke". Matthew Weiner also received a nomination in the same category for writing "The Suitcase".

The American Film Institute honored the series as one of the ten greatest television achievements of 2010, for the fourth year in a row. AFI referred to the fourth season as its finest, and praised Jon Hamm, the ensemble cast, and the storyline revolving around Don Draper's decline. AFI also exalted creator Matthew Weiner as a "master of the medium". The fourth season of Mad Men was nominated for the Best Television Drama Series at the 68th Golden Globe Awards. Jon Hamm was nominated for the Best Actor – Television Series Drama award for the fourth year in a row. Elisabeth Moss also received a nomination for the Best Actress – Television Series Drama award.

Mad Men won "Dramatic Series" at the 2010 WGA Awards. The episode "The Chrysanthemum and the Sword" also won the "Episodic Drama" award. Jennifer Getzinger was nominated for a Directors Guild Award for directing "The Suitcase". The fourth season also won the Outstanding Achievement in Drama award at the 27th Television Critics Association Awards. Jon Hamm also won the Individual Achievement in Drama award for his performance as Don Draper during the fourth season.
