= Public Relations (Mad Men) =

- Mad Men episode
- Episode no.: Season 4 Episode 1
- Directed by: Phil Abraham
- Written by: Matthew Weiner
- Original air date: July 25, 2010
- Running time: 48 minutes

Guest appearances
- Christopher Stanley as Henry Francis; Matt Long as Joey Baird; Anna Camp as Bethany Van Nuys; Erin Cummings as Candace; Blake Bashoff as Mark Kerney; Pamela Dunlap as Pauline Francis; Jack Laufer as Frank Keller; Chris McGarry as Jack Hammond; Ron Perkins as Jim Hartsdale; Paul Bartholomew as Bob Finley

Episode chronology
| ← Previous "Shut the Door. Have a Seat." | Next → "Christmas Comes But Once a Year" |
- Mad Men season 4

"Public Relations" is the season premiere of the fourth season of the American television drama series Mad Men, and the 40th overall episode of the series. It was written by series creator and executive producer Matthew Weiner, and directed by Phil Abraham. It originally aired on AMC in the United States on July 25, 2010. The episode takes place in November 1964, about a year after the advertising agency Sterling Cooper Draper Pryce was started, and Don Draper (Jon Hamm) is struggling with his divorce. The agency partners are concerned about the narrow breadth of their client base, which is not helped by Don coming across as less than sympathetic in an interview with a trade magazine. Peggy Olson (Elisabeth Moss) attempts a viral marketing stunt to bring back a disgruntled client, with unexpected repercussions. Meanwhile, Don's ex-wife Betty (January Jones) is struggling to fit in with her new family, and Don encounters problems in his romantic life.

"Public Relations" was heavily promoted in the weeks leading up to its airing, with an endorsement by President Obama and product tie-in by Mattel toys helping with publicity. Weiner expressed displeasure with what he considered a media revelation of plot details, though other journalists called his objections unwarranted. "Public Relations" was critically acclaimed by television critics, who expressed that the series returned to form. Upon airing, the episode was viewed by 2.92 million viewers and attained a 0.9 rating in the 18–49 demographic, according to Nielsen ratings.

== Plot ==
In November 1964, Don Draper (Jon Hamm) is being interviewed by a reporter from Advertising Age and declines to speak about his personal life. As a result, he comes across as arrogant and inscrutable in the published story – a fact that senior partners Roger Sterling (John Slattery) and Bert Cooper (Robert Morse) lament, as they had hoped the interview would act as advertising for the company. One effect of the bad publicity is brought home just after Harry Crane (Rich Sommer) has sold a Jai Alai special to ABC. It must be pulled because the client, Pete Campbell's (Vincent Kartheiser) college friend, Horace Cook Jr. (nicknamed "Ho Ho"), fires the agency because Don did not mention the client in his interview. Because of the agency's narrow client base, the loss is financially detrimental. Bert suggests Don do an interview with The Wall Street Journal to make amends, but Don demurs. Meanwhile, Peggy Olson (Elisabeth Moss) comes up with an idea to regain the Sugarberry Ham account. She hires two actresses to fight over a ham in a grocery store. The plan goes awry when the fight turns real and one of the women presses charges against the other for assault, and Peggy has to ask Don for bail and hush money. Don disapproves of the stunt (which was carried out behind his back), but Peggy points out that they did retain the account. Peggy is shown to have a friendly working relationship with Joey Baird (Matt Long), a new employee. They consistently roleplay the John and Marsha single by Stan Freberg whilst also helping and later presenting their ideas for Sugarberry Ham to Pete.

Don settles in as a bachelor after his divorce from Betty (January Jones). Roger sets him up on a date with Bethany, a friend of his wife Jane, who is a petite blonde, like Betty. After the date, Bethany (Anna Camp) expresses interest in seeing Don again, but rejects his sexual advances. On Thanksgiving Day, Don spends time with a prostitute, and Betty has problems fitting in with the family of her new husband Henry Francis (Christopher Stanley). At Thanksgiving dinner with his family, Betty's daughter Sally (Kiernan Shipka) complains about the food and spits it out. This childish behavior blows up into a scene when Betty scolds Sally, treats her brusquely, and causes problems by forcing food into Sally's mouth. Henry's mother later privately expresses displeasure with her son's new wife, observing that her children are clearly scared of her. However, in bed, Henry and Betty get along. The next day, Don picks up his two oldest children for an overnight visit, and Don is disappointed he can't see baby Gene, whom Betty has sent to Carla's. Betty curtly tells Don to have the kids back by 9. When he returns the next evening, the house is empty and he has to wait for Betty and Henry to come back. When they return, well past 9 pm, an argument ensues about the house; Don, at his accountant's instigation, angrily reminds them they were supposed to be out a month ago, and he demands they either buy him out, pay him rent, or leave. A minor argument later sparks between Henry and Betty when Henry agrees with Don's point. Betty stubbornly reiterates that they will leave on her timetable, not Don's.

A different client, Jantzen swimwear, asks for help to maintain a family-friendly image in a field where bikinis are becoming more common and more revealing. They insist they do not sell "bikinis" (which they liken to underwear) but rather two-piece bathing suits. Don tries to sell a pitch wherein the model's breasts are obscured by the slogan, "So well built, we can't show you the second floor". The Jantzen representatives reject the ad as overly risqué, and Don – exasperated by the clients' refusal to acknowledge a changing culture and the realities of their business – ends up throwing the men out of the meeting room. As they leave, he finally agrees to do the interview with The Wall Street Journal. As the episode ends, Don is seen telling the journalist the swashbuckling story of how he instigated the formation of SCDP by having Lane Pryce (Jared Harris) fire them.

== Production ==
"Public Relations" was heavily advertised in the weeks prior to its broadcasting. Producers of the series' entered into a cross-promotional deal with Banana Republic, and Janie Bryant, the show's costume designer, collaborated with QVC to design a clothing line inspired by mod subculture. President Barack Obama, a fan of Mad Men, had sent series creator Matthew Weiner a letter to express his admiration. Attention was further boosted by the release of a series of Barbie dolls based on characters from the show by toy manufacturer Mattel. A week prior to the premiere of the episode, recurring cast member Crista Flanagan (who plays Lois Sadler) posed nude for Playboy.

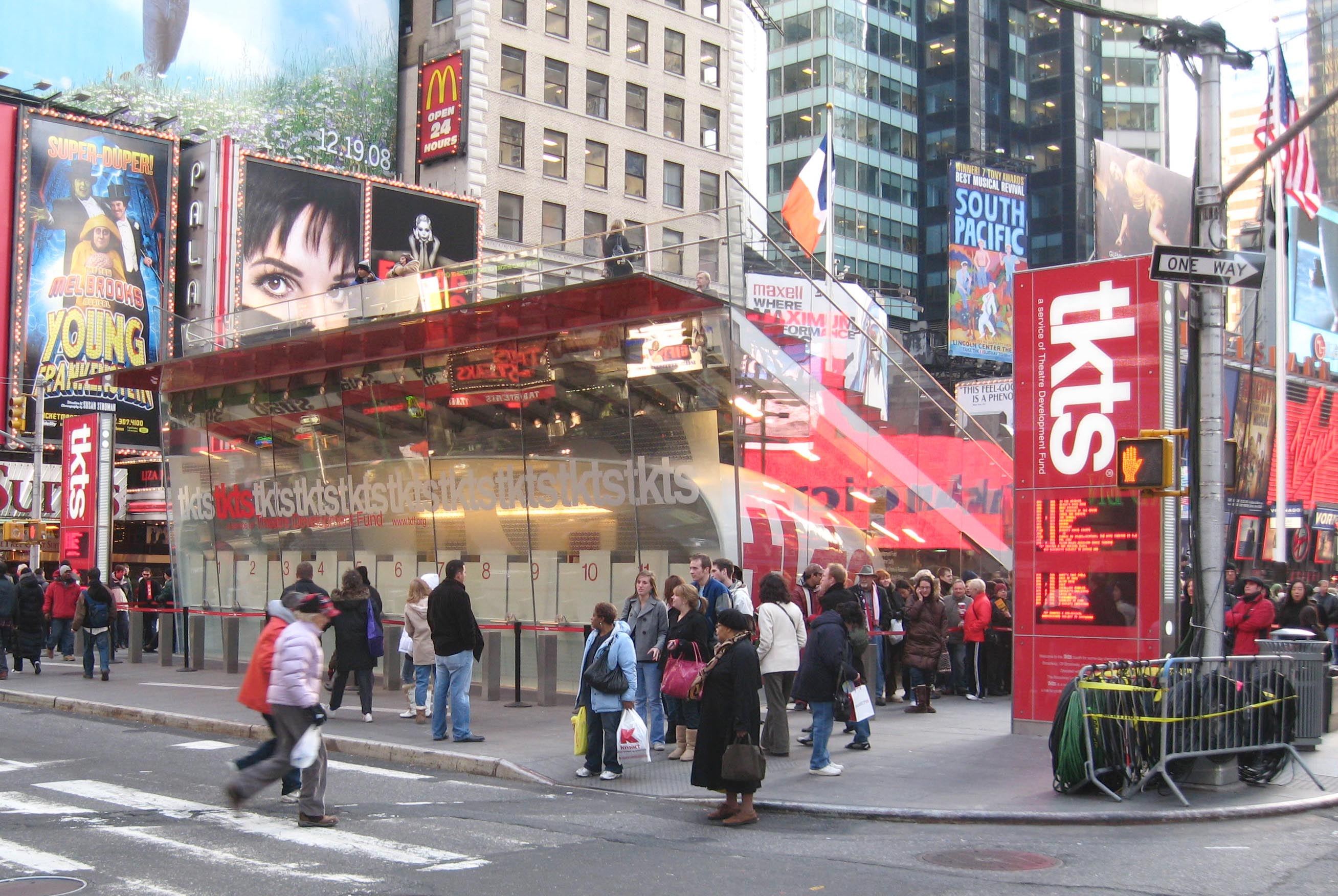
"Public Relations" was screened at Duffy Square in New York City an hour before it was televised.

Screenings for the episode were shown in Los Angeles, California on July 21, 2010, and again five days later at Duffy Square in New York City an hour before it was televised nationwide. The designs of costumes were altered, according to Bryant, to reflect the general fashion development and changes in mainstream pop culture during the 1960s. In an interview with the San Francisco Chronicle, she teased: "My characters are in an office environment in New York; it's very different from what was going on in London at the time. But there will be some progression in their costumes, just like in real life.

The press were given advanced copies of the episode. Matthew Weiner pronounced himself shocked by what he considered spoilers in the review. Weiner criticized the episode's review by Alessandra Stanley of the New York Times, expressing that the publication revealed too much information. He continued: "I'm kind of powerless. It's the bargain you make. I wanted to have press, and it was nice to get that kind of space with those pictures. The alternative is not to share these things with the press any more – but how can you expect journalists to write about the show if you don’t? It was all very disappointing to me.

"Public Relations" features several references to media, music, film, and other pop culture phenomena. Peggy and a coworker engage in a humorous conversation, in which they subsequently refer to "A Dear John and Marsha Letter" by Stan Freberg. The episode depicts the growing acceptance of the bikini in mainstream popular culture in the United States during the 1960s.

== Reception ==
"Public Relations" first aired in the United States on July 25, 2010, on AMC. It was watched by 2.92 million viewers, and attained a 0.9 rating in the 18–49 demographic, according to Nielsen ratings. Total viewership increased 5% from the previous season premiere, "Out of Town", which was viewed by 2.76 million viewers. In contrast, ratings for "Public Relations" were constant to that of "Out of Town". Likewise, total viewership was significantly up from the previous episode, "Shut the Door. Have a Seat", which attained 2.32 million viewers.

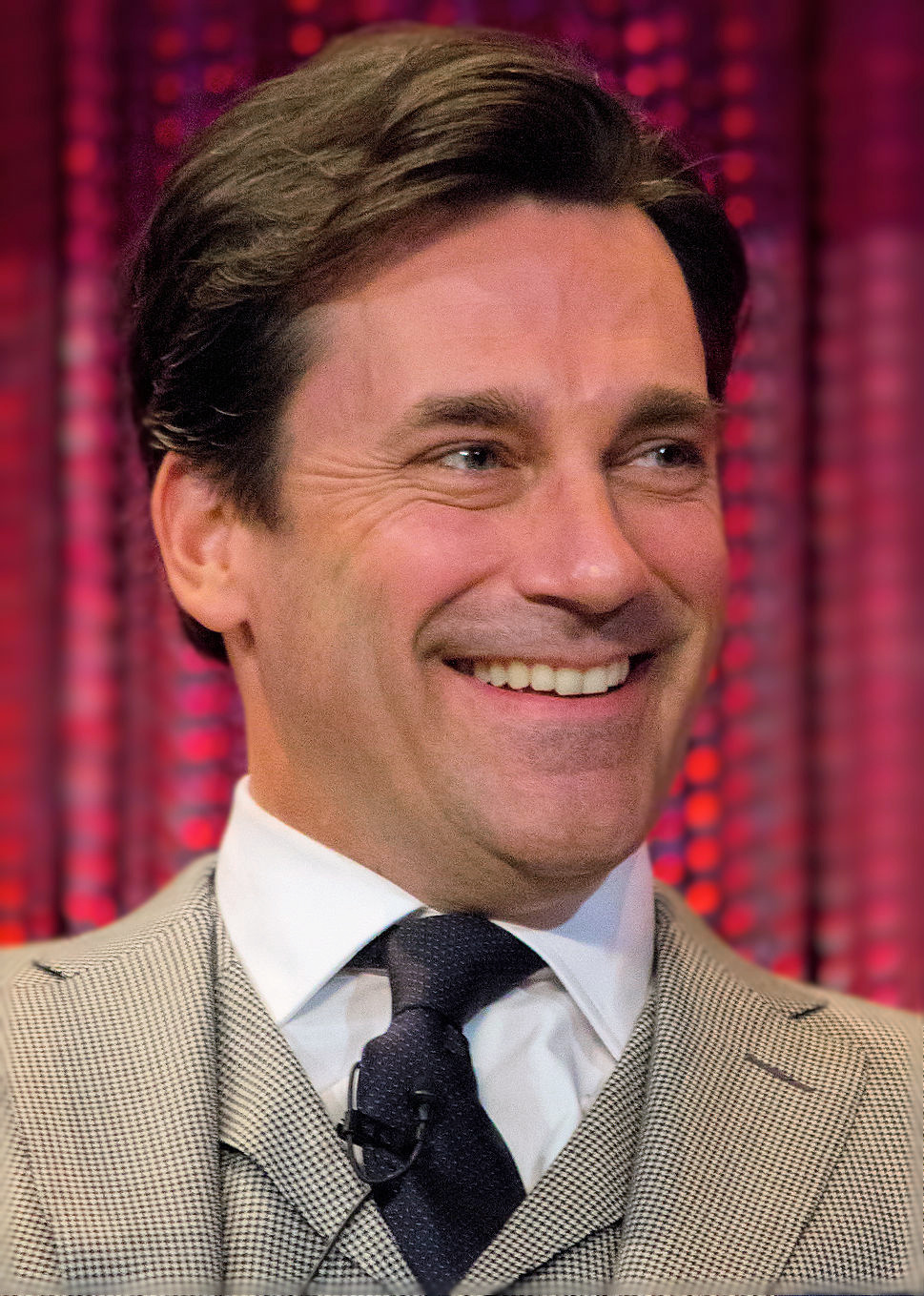
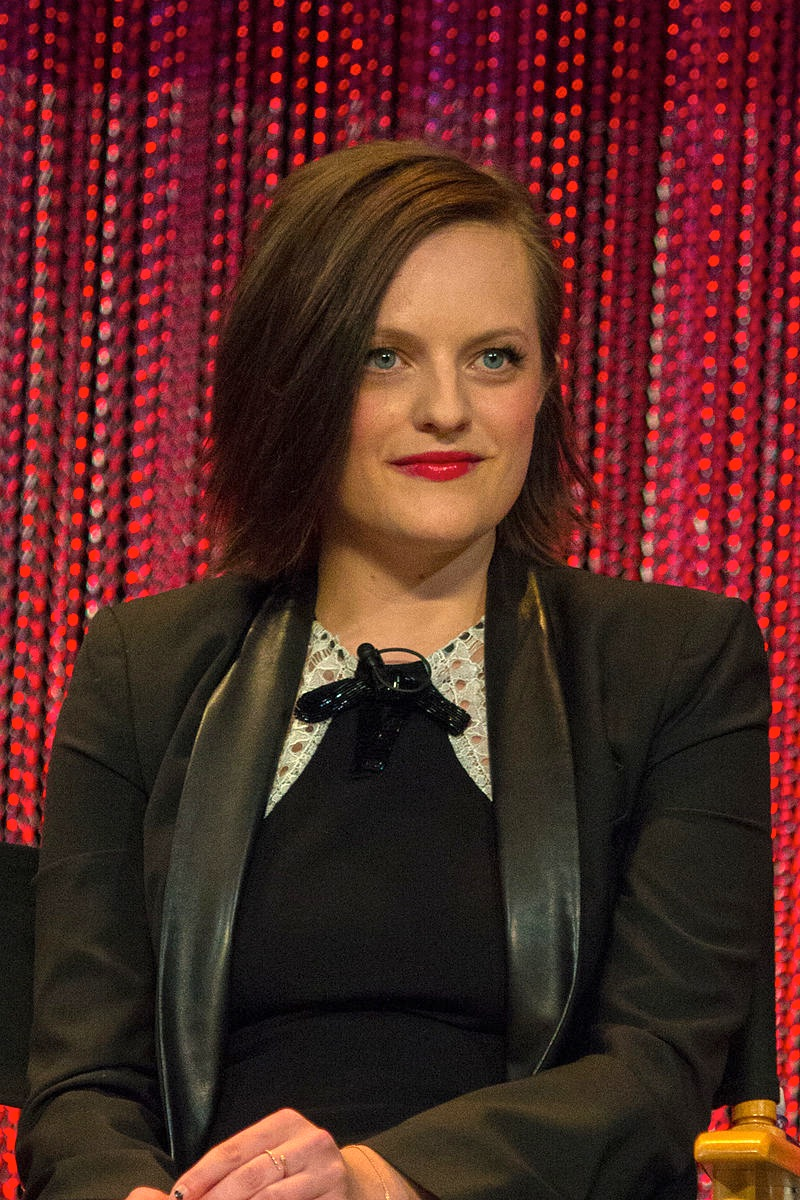
Critics appreciated the character development of Don Draper (Jon Hamm) and Peggy Olson (Elisabeth Moss)

The episode was critically acclaimed by television critics. Alessandra Stanley of The New York Times opined, "Those cues also hold out the promise that the coming season will once again pivot the story on the workplace. It’s where Mad Men started and where it was best. A fresh start at the rat race is just what the series needs." Eric Goldman of IGN gave the episode a nine out of ten, signifying an "amazing" rating. Goldman felt that it started the season on a strong note, writing, "It's a clever beat to start out with, leading into a strong premiere that quickly drops us into what can be described as Mad Men 2.0." Praise was also directed to the musical selection of the episode, which Goldman described as excellent. In concurrence, Keith Phipps of The A.V. Club gave the episode an 'A' grade, praising the character development of Don Draper and Peggy Olson. Expressing that she had more confidence, Phipps said of Peggy: "[She's] the person who's changed most notably over the last year. She drinks at work like the boys and [...] goes into a Don-like trance as she searches for inspiration. She bosses Joey around and tells him when he’s gone too far. And she’s not afraid to get creative to sell ham and wants credit for her idea, even if it encounters a minor disaster along the way. Most significantly, she’s standing up to Don at every turn now. He bullies her in front of her fiancé but hears about it later. And she provides a devastating mixture of admiration and chiding when she reminds Don that everyone at SCDP is there because of him and out of a desire to make him happy." Similarly, James Poniewozik of Time praised the performance of Elisabeth Moss, exclaiming that "she has come a long way."

TV Fanatic's Dan Forcella felt that "Public Relations" was a fantastic episode, and asserted: "All in all it was a great start to the fourth season of Mad Men." In conclusion, Forcella gave the episode a 4.5 out of 5 stars. The Wall Street Journal journalist Cheryl Berman opined that the episode had a "little bit of everything we love about Mad Men." William Bradley wrote in The Huffington Post that the series got off to "a cracking start" with "Public Relations". Similarly, Scott D. Pierce of the Deseret News found it to be "a very good episode and a very promising restart", after what he considered a disappointing third season.
