= Hands and Knees =

- Mad Men episode
- Episode no.: Season 4 Episode 10
- Directed by: Lynn Shelton
- Written by: Jonathan Abrahams; Matthew Weiner
- Original air date: September 26, 2010
- Running time: 48 minutes

Guest appearances
- Christopher Stanley as Henry Francis; Alison Brie as Trudy Campbell; Cara Buono as Dr. Faye Miller; Jessica Paré as Megan Calvet; Darren Pettie as Lee Garner Jr.; Jack Laufer as Frank Keller; Naturi Naughton as Toni Charles; W. Morgan Sheppard as Robert Pryce

Episode chronology
← Previous "The Beautiful Girls"	Next → "Chinese Wall"
- Mad Men season 4

"Hands and Knees" is the tenth episode of the fourth season of the American television drama series Mad Men, and the 49th overall episode of the series. It aired on the AMC channel in the United States on September 26, 2010. John Slattery submitted this episode for consideration on his nomination for the Primetime Emmy Award for Outstanding Supporting Actor in a Drama Series at the 63rd Primetime Emmy Awards.

== Plot ==
Joan Harris (Christina Hendricks) informs Roger Sterling (John Slattery) that she is pregnant, and that he is the father because Greg has been away for weeks. Roger is surprised, but tells her not to be upset about it. Lane Pryce's (Jared Harris) father, Robert Pryce (W. Morgan Sheppard), arrives to bring him back to London, which Lane refuses to do. They make dinner plans and Lane asks Don Draper (Jon Hamm) to come to defuse the tension between them.

Two men from the Department of Defense come to the Francis home to question Betty (January Jones) since North American Aviation has requested verification of Don's application form. Betty lies to them to protect Don's secret. In a phone call made after they've left, Betty tells Don about the meeting, which instantly throws him into a panic. He learns that his secretary, Megan (Jessica Paré), filled out his application form and he unknowingly signed it, unaware that it contained lies that could potentially compromise his identity.

Don goes to Pete Campbell (Vincent Kartheiser), who knows about his true identity, for help. Don points out numerous contradictions on the application such as the real Don Draper's age and his MOS as an engineer. Pete has his friend in the Department of Defense look into it. Pete tries to put Don's mind at ease, but Don points out that since he technically deserted, he could face military prison. Roger and Joan set up an abortion, but Joan insists that Roger not come since they should not be seen together. At the clinic, Joan speaks with a mother of a 17-year-old girl who assumes that the reason Joan is there is for an abortion for her "daughter" instead of herself. Joan goes along with it and mentions that her daughter is fifteen. Then she is seen on a bus returning from the doctor's. At the office she tells Roger that they "avoided a tragedy".

Lane introduces his father to Toni Charles (Naturi Naughton), a Playboy Bunny with whom he is having an affair. Irritated with his son, Robert Pryce demands that Lane return to London. Lane refuses again, and Robert responds by hitting him about the head with his cane. He then tells Lane to "Put your home in order, either there or here." After this, Lane decides to return to London.

Roger has dinner with Lee Garner, Jr., who tells him that Lucky Strike will be moving to BBDO, ending their 30-year history together. Knowing that this means doom for SCDP, Roger begs him to give them 30 days before moving to get their affairs in order. Garner agrees to do so but informs him that there is nothing that can be done to fix the situation.

After returning home with Faye Miller, Don mistakes two men for agents of the Department of Defense, and is struck with a panic attack. Now fearing that his life as Don Draper is coming to an end, he tells Faye his secret. Faye is surprised at this information, but she expresses gratitude for his telling her. Pete tells Don that the Department of Defense has not flagged him, and ending the account with North American Aviation will end the investigation. Don wants him to kill the account, but Pete is reluctant, as it is worth $4 million. His loyalty to Don proves stronger, and he eventually agrees. In the next meeting of the partners, Pete fabricates a story to explain why North American Aviation is leaving SCDP, and accepts the blame for it. Knowing that the loss of this account will mean a heavy loss for the agency after losing Lucky Strike, Roger yells at Pete. Joan goes through the "status of accounts" and Roger gives a thumbs up when Lucky Strike is called, indicating his intention to hide the loss from the other partners.

== Music ==
During the end credits of the episode, Santo and Johnny's instrumental cover of the Beatles song "Do You Want to Know a Secret" is played.

== First appearances ==
- Robert Pryce: Lane's strict, overbearing and abusive father, a middle-class British salesman who tries to get Lane to reunite with his now estranged wife Rebecca.
- Toni Charles: A black waitress at the Playboy Club who is having a secret love affair with Lane.

== Final appearance ==
- Lee Garner Jr.: One of the owners and heir to Lucky Strike who leaves SCDP after working for many years as their client.

== Reception ==
The episode was watched 2.12 million viewers on the night of its original airing, while 0.7 million viewers in the adults 18-49 age demographic viewed the episode.
