= Chinese Wall (Mad Men) =

- Mad Men episode
- Episode no.: Season 4 Episode 11
- Directed by: Phil Abraham
- Written by: Erin Levy
- Original air date: October 3, 2010
- Running time: 48 minutes

Guest appearances
- Joel Murray as Freddy Rumsen; Ray Wise as Ed Baxter; Cara Buono as Dr. Faye Miller; Jessica Paré as Megan Calvet; Jay R. Ferguson as Stan Rizzo; Danny Strong as Danny Siegel; Charlie Hofheimer as Abe Drexler; Peyton List as Jane Sterling; Zosia Mamet as Joyce Ramsay; Kevin Rahm as Ted Chaough; Joe O'Connor as Tom Vogel; Sheila Shaw as Jeannie Vogel

Episode chronology
← Previous "Hands and Knees"	Next → "Blowing Smoke"
- Mad Men season 4

"Chinese Wall" is the eleventh episode of the fourth season of the American television drama series Mad Men, and the 50th overall episode of the series. It aired on the AMC channel in the United States on October 3, 2010. Cara Buono, who played Dr. Faye Miller, received a nomination for Primetime Emmy Award for Outstanding Guest Actress in a Drama Series for this episode.

== Plot ==
Ken Cosgrove finds out from an acquaintance at BBDO that Lucky Strike has left SCDP. The news spreads among the executives, resulting in a panicked emergency meeting. Roger Sterling, who has been hiding the impending disaster from his partners for weeks, fakes both an angry phone call to Lee Garner, Jr. and an angry visit to Garner's office. SCDP's executives tell the rest of the staff that Lucky Strike has defected as part of American Tobacco's cost-saving consolidation of accounts, but that the client has praised the agency's work. The executives also assure the staff that more accounts are coming in than going out, and everything is OK. All expenses must now be cleared through Lane Pryce or Joan Harris and in private Don tells the creative staff the firm is in trouble. Don charges them with protecting existing business and hitting home runs when pitching new business, while the partners and Accounts drum up new clients. Despite a few clients' jumping ship following the news (such as Glo-Coat), most stay, giving some hope for the future. The Accounts and Creative teams anticipate the worst. In the midst of the turmoil, Roger turns to Joan for comfort (which she provides, at arm's length, admonishing Roger that they cannot resume their affair), Megan seduces Don, Pete Campbell's baby girl is born, and Ted Chaough tries to recruit Pete, with Tom Vogel's encouragement.

== Reception ==
The episode was viewed by 2.06 million viewers on the night of its original airing, while 0.6 million viewers in the adults 18-49 demographic watched the episode.
