= The Suitcase (Mad Men) =

- Mad Men episode
- Episode no.: Season 4 Episode 7
- Directed by: Jennifer Getzinger
- Written by: Matthew Weiner
- Original air date: September 5, 2010
- Running time: 48 minutes

Guest appearances
- Blake Bashoff as Mark Kerney; Caity Lotz as Stephanie; Audrey Wasilewski as Anita Olson Respola; Mark Moses as Herman "Duck" Phillips; Myra Turley as Katherine Olson; Alison Brie as Trudy Campbell; Matt Long as Joey Baird; Jay R. Ferguson as Stan Rizzo; Danny Strong as Danny Siegel; Jessica Paré as Megan Calvet; Melinda Page Hamilton as Anna Draper

Episode chronology
← Previous "Waldorf Stories"	Next → "The Summer Man"
- Mad Men season 4

"The Suitcase" is the seventh episode of the fourth season of the American television drama series Mad Men, and the 46th overall episode of the series. It aired on the AMC channel in the United States on September 5, 2010.

This episode is centered on the characters of Don Draper (Jon Hamm) and Peggy Olson (Elisabeth Moss), and the relationship between the two. It was widely lauded by television critics; in subsequent years it has often been cited as the best episode of the series. The end of this episode marks the halfway point in the series (46/92).

Jon Hamm and Elisabeth Moss both submitted this episode for consideration for nominations for the Primetime Emmy Award for Outstanding Lead Actor and Actress in a Drama Series, respectively, at the 63rd Primetime Emmy Awards. At the same ceremony, Weiner received a nomination for Outstanding Writing for a Drama Series.

Regarded as one of the greatest episodes of television ever, "The Suitcase" has been described as the peak of television's Golden Age.

== Plot ==
The episode focuses almost entirely on the characters of Don Draper and Peggy Olson. A deadline is looming over a campaign for the suitcase manufacturer Samsonite, and Don rejects all of the creative department's ideas. Most of the staff (that being Joey Baird (Matt Long), Stan Rizzo (Jay R. Ferguson) and Danny Siegel (Danny Strong)) all plan to watch the May 25, 1965, Ali vs. Liston fight that night, except for Peggy who has plans for a romantic birthday dinner with her boyfriend Mark. Duck Phillips calls to offer her the creative director job at the ad agency he intends to start. She acts flattered, but turns him down as she deduces that he had to leave his earlier job because of drinking. Don receives a message from Stephanie, Anna Draper's niece, that he should call her back immediately. He puts off calling and decides to forgo the boxing match to continue working on the Samsonite campaign.

Don stops Peggy from leaving to go over her new ideas for the campaign. He criticizes all of them and wants to keep working, forcing her to call Mark to tell him she will be late. When she finally tries to cancel their dinner, Mark reveals he has invited Peggy's family and roommate along as a surprise. Don allows Peggy to leave, but refuses to feel guilty for making her work on her birthday.

Peggy decides to stay and calls Mark to cancel again. Peggy's mother berates her over the phone for treating Mark like this, and Mark, equally annoyed, breaks up with Peggy with her family listening. Peggy returns to Don's office where they end up in an argument over the lack of credit Don gave Peggy for her idea on the award-winning Glo-Coat campaign and his lack of appreciation for her work in general. The conversation causes Peggy to storm off to cry in the ladies' room. Later, Don calls her back into his office to listen to a tape he has found for Roger Sterling's memoirs where Roger discusses his, Burt Cooper's, and Ida Blankenship's pasts. The two laugh over the embarrassing revelations about their co-workers and go out for a meal.

Over dinner, and later drinks, the two intimately discuss their lives. They learn that they both saw their fathers die when they were young, and Don admits he never knew his mother. Peggy tells Don that people in the office believe she slept with him to get her job. She also divulges that her mother believes he fathered her baby owing to Don's visiting Peggy in the hospital shortly after the child was born. Don asks if she knows who the father was. Peggy replies, "Of course" but does not reveal that it was Pete Campbell or what happened to the baby. They listen to Cassius Clay's quick victory in the boxing match.

When they return to the office, Duck Phillips shows up after trying to call Peggy to discuss his new business. He is drunk, and as Peggy leads Duck out, Don sees them. Duck tells a shocked Don he and Peggy were in love, but ultimately she is "just another whore". Don drunkenly swings at Duck, who overpowers him. Peggy gets rid of Duck, and admits to Don that she and Duck had an affair. He tells Peggy she doesn't owe him an explanation and asks for another drink.

Don intends finally to call Stephanie back, but instead falls asleep in Peggy's lap. He wakes in the middle of the night with Peggy asleep beside him, and sees a vision of Anna smiling with a suitcase. The next morning, he calls Stephanie and receives the news he was expecting: that Anna died. He breaks down sobbing in front of Peggy, referring to Anna as the only person who really knew him. Peggy responds that "that's not true."

Peggy curls up in her office to go back asleep and is woken up by Joey, Stan and Danny in the morning. She goes to Don's office to find that he has developed an idea for the suitcase campaign based on the Ali vs. Liston knock-out photo. Peggy is skeptical about his idea, but then reassures him that it is good. Don takes her hand in his for a moment, and the two exchange looks before she leaves. The episode ends with Simon and Garfunkel's "Bleecker Street" playing as the Sterling Cooper Draper Pryce office begins its day.

== Production ==
=== Writing ===
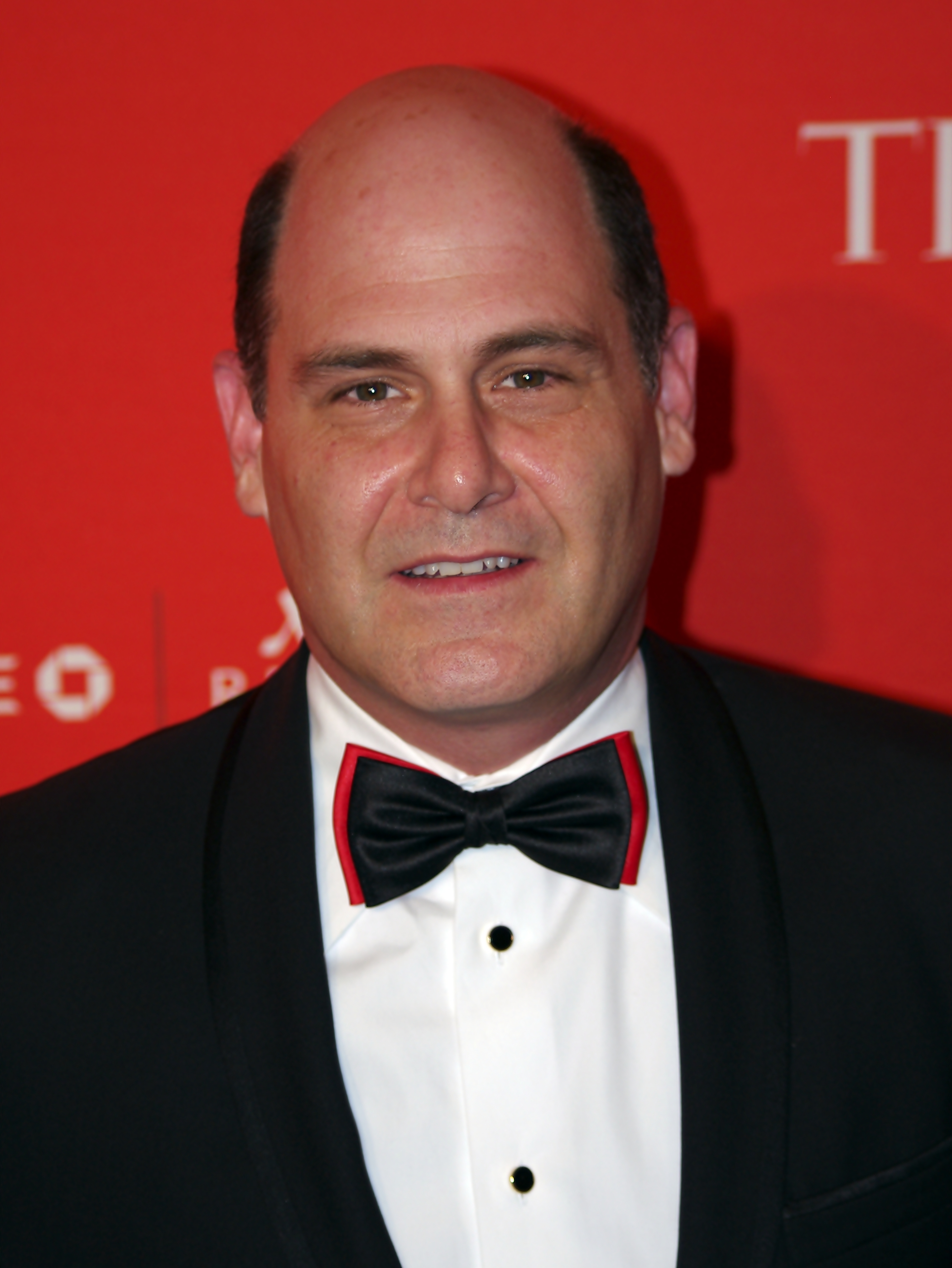
Series creator Matthew Weiner wrote the script for "The Suitcase"

Matthew Weiner compared Peggy's standing at Sterling Cooper Draper Pryce to his own standing while working under David Chase on The Sopranos. Jon Hamm commended the writers for adding in the conversation that references the child Peggy gave away, calling it "heartbreaking" for Peggy. Weiner said, "they can acknowledge that that happened. Even though they had sworn to never talk about it together, this is the place that they can talk about it. I also think that Don’s interest in it is really a big part of it." Weiner elaborated on Draper's dislike for Duck, attributing it to Duck's "lack of understanding of creative" and "his alcoholism", while citing Duck's sexual relationship with Peggy, who Weiner said could be Don's daughter figure in that moment.

On the subject of Don's vision of the deceased Anna Draper, Weiner said, "Once the suitcase was in Anna’s hands, which was the last thing that was added to that script, you realize that it’s probably in Don’s mind because what is on his mind is his job. But it’s so symbolic… Every single person has heard some version of this story… when someone important has died, they have had a sense of premonition or visitation."

=== Filming ===
Matthew Weiner credited the cinematographer Chris Manley and director Jennifer Getzinger for the "gradations of darkness, of afternoon into night into early morning, the way that they’re posed together, it just really made the whole thing work."

Jon Hamm elaborated on the difficulty of filming the heavy emotional scenes with Elisabeth Moss in which Hamm breaks down after learning of Anna's death, saying that "Episode eight, everyone is starting to get exhausted. When we had those lines together, just looking at Elisabeth’s face, when I realized that she’s heard this entire phone call, how completely awash with emotion she was, it seemed like the only response to that was to just completely break down and let it all go. It’s a remarkable alchemy between writing, acting, directing, lighting, and everything else for them to make that a really nice moment."

=== Editing ===
Originally, during the emotional climax of the episode in which Don and Peggy hold hands, Draper told Peggy "Thank you." The line was taken out in post-production so as to not undermine the visual power of the scene, as the creative team believed the scene was more powerful through nonverbal acknowledgement.

== Cultural references ==
The Ali vs. Liston bout was a rematch of a February 1964 fight (at which point Muhammad Ali was still called Cassius Clay). The 1965 fight is noted for Ali's so-called "phantom punch", that knocked out Sonny Liston, as well as for a photo of Ali standing over a fallen Liston, one of the most famous photos in sports history. There were speculations at the time that Liston took a fall on orders from the Mafia. Another sports reference in the episode is found in Peggy's original pitch for the Samsonite ad, featuring football player Joe Namath. Namath, a burgeoning player at the time, would later become a highly sought-after product endorser.

The episode solved a mystery from a previous episode: Roger Sterling's reference to a Dr. Lyle Evans. The name caused much speculation among reviewers, and a spike in Google Searches for the name. Rather than a real-life person, Dr. Evans turned out to be a doctor who once performed an unnecessary orchiectomy on Bert Cooper.

The episode ends with the song "Bleecker Street" from Simon & Garfunkel's 1964 album Wednesday Morning, 3 A.M..

== Deceased ==
- Anna Draper: The wife of the deceased Lt. Draper, Patty's sister and Don's closest ally who dies of cancer offscreen. The death is reported by her niece Stephanie and a brief vision of her ghost is seen by Don.

== Final appearance ==
- Mark Kerney: Peggy's controlling boyfriend set up to be married to her by her mother who breaks up with her because he thinks that she prioritizes her work over him.

== Reception ==
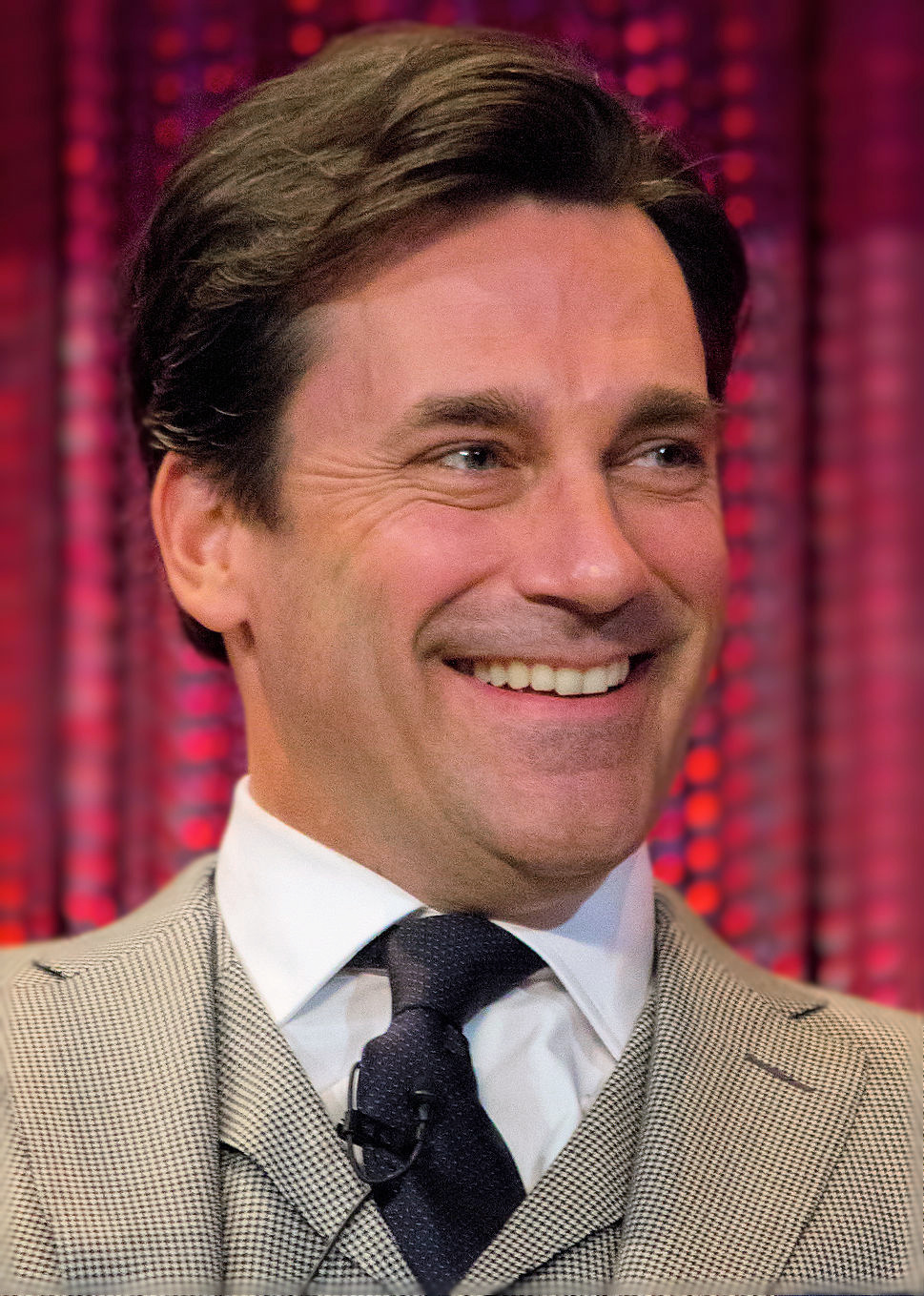
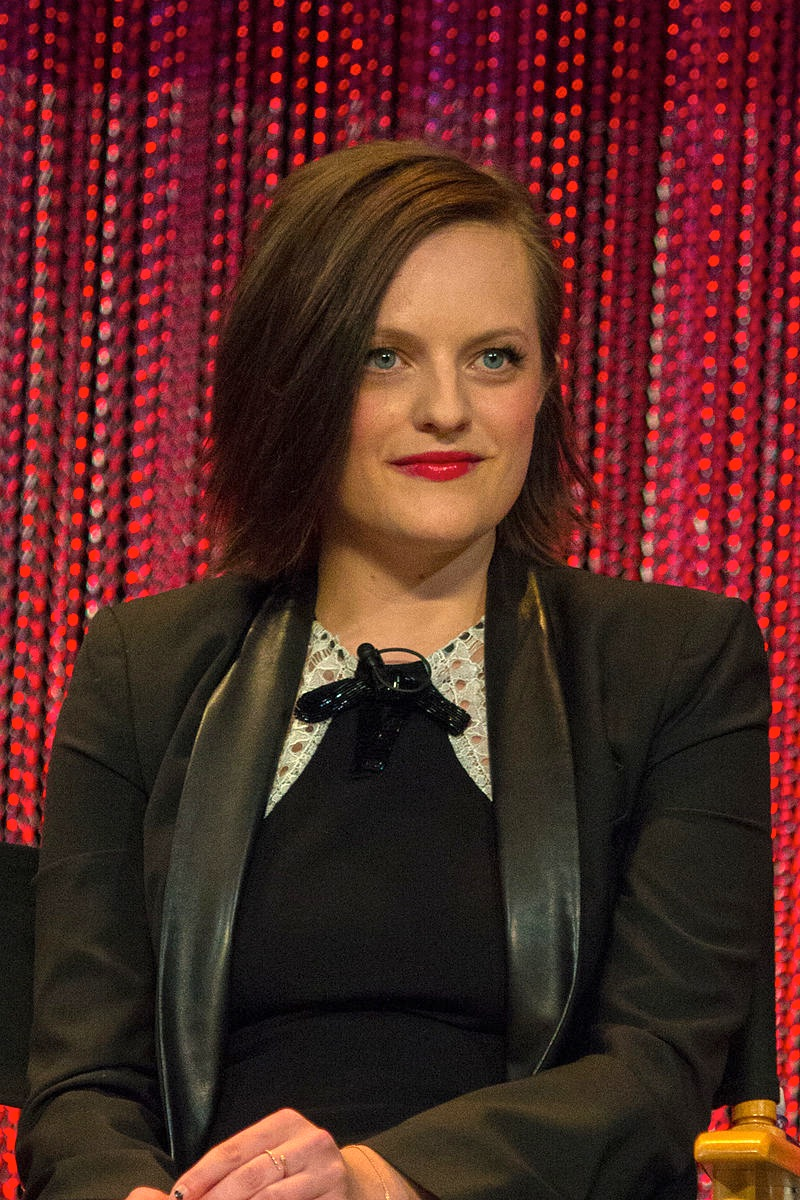
Jon Hamm (left) and Elisabeth Moss (right) both received critical acclaim for their performances

On its original American broadcast on September 5, 2010, on AMC, the episode was viewed by 2.17 million people.

The episode received universal praise from television critics and is considered by many to be the series' greatest episode. The A.V. Club critic Emily St. James called it "one of the best episodes the show has ever done", writing that a scene toward the end between Peggy and a tearful Don was "enormously moving". Ken Tucker of Entertainment Weekly called the episode "a knock-out", and commented on the "remarkable intimacy" of the scenes between Don and Peggy. The Baltimore Sun's David Zurawik, after some initial deliberation, concluded that it was "a great episode". He pointed out how it made him care about the fates of both Peggy and Don in a way he had not for a long time.

Jennifer Smith at CNN found some of the scenes in the episode among "the most powerful of the entire series". She implied that the performances of both Jon Hamm and Elisabeth Moss were Emmy Award material. William Bradley, reviewing the episode for The Huffington Post, also mentioned the Emmy Awards. He called Hamm's performance "fantastic", believing it was "time for him to win the Emmy as best actor". Moss he found "even more of a revelation...as a young woman coming of age". Entertainment Weekly's Karen Valby called it her "favorite Mad Men episode of all time", highlighting the performances of the two main actors.

Actors Moss and Aaron Staton chose "The Suitcase" as their favorite episode of Mad Men so far. Moss said of the episode, "It's the greatest material I've ever had the privilege of acting." Hamm said, "I've never ever worked on something and felt the way I felt after we shot the episode in Season 4 called 'The Suitcase'. That one ... I can't even put it into words."

For its 65th anniversary, TV Guide picked it as the seventh-best episode of the 21st century. The Writers Guild Foundation listed the screenplay as one of the best in 2010s film and television, and the episode was described as "a great example of two unlikely characters opening up with each other and finding a weird, unexpected solace. Where Don carelessly goes to bed with, dates or marries the next pretty girl, here with Peggy, he shares something slightly more special and transformative: his feelings."

== See also ==
- List of television episodes listed among the best
