= The Rejected (Mad Men) =

- Mad Men episode
- Peggy goes to a beatnik party with her new friend Joyce.
- Episode no.: Season 4 Episode 4
- Directed by: John Slattery
- Written by: Keith Huff; Matthew Weiner
- Original air date: August 15, 2010
- Running time: 48 minutes

Guest appearances
- Cara Buono as Faye Miller; Jessica Paré as Megan; Randee Heller as Miss Blankenship; Charlie Hofheimer as Abe Drexler; Zosia Mamet as Joyce Ramsay

Episode chronology
← Previous "The Good News"	Next → "The Chrysanthemum and the Sword"
- Mad Men season 4

"The Rejected" is the fourth episode of the fourth season of the American television drama series Mad Men, and the 43rd overall episode of the series. It was written by Keith Huff and series creator and executive producer Matthew Weiner, and directed by John Slattery, who portrays Roger Sterling on the show. It originally aired on the AMC channel in the United States on August 15, 2010. Reviews of the episode were generally positive, emphasizing particularly the emotional tension between Pete Campbell (Vincent Kartheiser) and Peggy Olson (Elisabeth Moss).

== Plot ==
In February 1965, reformed alcoholic Freddy Rumsen (Joel Murray) has returned to Sterling Cooper Draper Pryce after a several-year absence, working freelance and primarily trying to help Peggy Olson (Elisabeth Moss). He has delivered Ponds Cold Cream to the agency but does not want Pete Campbell (Vincent Kartheiser) - who previously got Freddy fired - to work on the account. However, Ponds complains to Roger Sterling (John Slattery) that SCDP's client Clearasil is a conflict of interest, even though Clearasil is an acne cream aimed at teens and Ponds is a cold cream aimed at women. Because Ponds bills more, Roger orders Pete to tell his father-in-law Tom Vogel (Joe O'Connor), a high-level executive at the Vicks Chemical Company, that SCDP needs to drop the Clearasil account. When he meets with Tom, Tom believes Pete arranged the meeting to tell him that Trudy is pregnant, which shocks Pete but excites him. Later, Pete decides to "force Tom's hand" into giving him the entire Vicks account, with advertising billings worth over US$6 million (equivalent to US$61.3 million in 2025). Tom is angry but impressed at what he considers blackmail.

Dr. Faye Miller (Cara Buono) conducts interviews with single women in the office about their beauty regimens and what products they use. The discussion quickly turns to men treating them badly. Don's secretary Allison (Alexa Alemanni) grows emotional during the meeting, feeling hurt and used after her one-night stand with Don. She runs out of the session in tears. Peggy tries to comfort Allison, who insinuates that Peggy also slept with Don and used this as leverage to get promoted to copywriter. Peggy, offended, tells Allison to get over Don. Allison later tells Don that what happened between them was a mistake and asks for a letter of recommendation so she can find a job elsewhere. Don offers to sign a letter that Allison types for herself, which Allison takes as indifference and storms off. The next day, Joan replaces Allison with Bert Cooper's former secretary, the aged Miss Ida Blankenship (Randee Heller).

Pete and Harry Crane have lunch with Ken Cosgrove (Aaron Staton), who is engaged to the daughter of Corning's CFO. Ken has been shifting from firm to firm since the collapse of Sterling Cooper but expresses dissatisfaction with where he is now. Pete subtly insinuates he might do well to hire on with SCDP. In Don's office, Dr. Miller presents her findings from the focus group, reporting that the best strategy is to tap into young women's desire to get married. Don rejects the strategy as old-fashioned and dismisses Dr. Miller's role in the creative process as useless and intrusive.

Peggy makes friends with a young photo editor at Life magazine named Joyce Ramsay (Zosia Mamet), who also works in the Time-Life Building. Joyce invites Peggy to a party, where she introduces Peggy to her friends, a group of marijuana-smoking bohemian artists. Peggy finds herself attracted to Abe Drexler (Charlie Hofheimer), an abrasive yet charming underground newspaper writer. Later, Peggy learns that Trudy is pregnant when a secretary brings a card for her and Joey Baird (Matt Long) to sign in the break room. Peggy does not sign the card and instead goes into Pete's office to congratulate him; he thanks her, but the interaction ends awkwardly. Later, Peggy meets with Joyce and her beatnik friends for lunch and catches Pete's eye through SCDP's glass doors. The two share a private smile.

== Production ==
John Slattery, who portrays Roger Sterling on the show, directed this episode. This is Slattery's first work as a director.

== First appearances ==
- Joyce Ramsay: A beatnik lesbian photographer in the Time & Life building who becomes best friends with Peggy.
- Abraham "Abe" Drexler: A Jewish underground reporter, beatnik and Joyce's acquaintance who later starts dating Peggy.
- Ida Blankenship: Don Draper's new secretary after Allison leaves. An aging woman who was also formerly Bert's secretary and previously had an affair with Roger.
- Clara: Pete's secretary whom he constantly verbally abuses and blames whenever he loses his temper.

== Final appearance ==
- Allison: Don's secretary who after having a one-night stand with him, leaves SCDP after he chooses not to have a relationship with her.

== Reception ==
On its original American broadcast on August 15, 2010, on AMC, the episode was viewed by 2.05 million people.

The episode received positive reviews from critics. David Zurawik of The Baltimore Sun emphasized the "moment of poignancy that didn't seem forced" between Peggy and Pete towards the end of the episode, after she found out about his wife's pregnancy. Zurawik found this a welcome relief from the "Don Draper TV-phony existentialism" that had dominated the season so far. Noel Murray, reviewing the episode for The A.V. Club, gave it a grade "A−". Murray liked the episode "a lot", and pointed to the scene with Peggy and Pete as the episode's highlight. At the same time he also voiced concerns that "Weiner’s stubborn insistence on keeping Don a lost soul could lead to creative stagnation". Mark Dawidziak, of the Cleveland newspaper The Plain Dealer, also highlighted the "poignant and telling glances" exchanged between Peggy and Pete, providing an "emotional payoff punch" to the episode.
