= Christmas Comes But Once a Year (Mad Men) =

- Mad Men episode
- Episode no.: Season 4 Episode 2
- Directed by: Michael Uppendahl
- Written by: Tracy McMillan; Matthew Weiner
- Original air date: August 1, 2010
- Running time: 48 minutes

Guest appearances
- Alison Brie as Trudy Campbell; Deborah Lacey as Carla; Joel Murray as Freddy Rumsen; Christopher Stanley as Henry Francis; Alexa Alemanni as Allison; Blake Bashoff as Mark Kerney; Matt Long as Joey Baird; Cara Buono as Dr. Faye Miller; John Aylward as Geoffrey Atherton; Darren Pettie as Lee Garner Jr.; Laura Regan as Jennifer Crane; Peyton List as Jane Sterling; Nora Zehetner as Phoebe; Jessica Paré as Megan Calvet

Episode chronology
← Previous "Public Relations"	Next → "The Good News"
- Mad Men season 4

"Christmas Comes But Once a Year" is the second episode of the fourth season of the American television drama series Mad Men, and the 41st overall episode of the series. It was written by series creator and executive producer Matthew Weiner and Tracy McMillan, and directed by Michael Uppendahl. It originally aired on the AMC channel in the United States on August 1, 2010.

The episode opens in December 1964, as Sterling Cooper Draper Pryce is hosting a Christmas party. As the company faces financial problems because of its limited client base and expensive new office space, Don Draper's personal life becomes ever more chaotic. Critical reception of the episode was positive.

== Plot ==
Sterling Cooper Draper Pryce intends to throw a scaled down Christmas party to save expenses. Don spends extra money on Christmas presents for his children after receiving a letter from Sally expressing her desire for him to be present in their house on Christmas morning. He also grows closer to his neighbor Phoebe, a nurse, especially after she helps him when he comes home drunk. Meanwhile, Peggy's boyfriend, Mark, urges her to have sex with him, but she puts him off. He believes that this is because she is old-fashioned and still a virgin.

The office holds a meeting with their newly hired consumer research company. Dr. Faye Miller, a psychiatrist, gives a presentation and passes out questionnaires for the staff to fill out as an example of their research process. Don leaves the meeting early rather than answer questions about his personal life and childhood. A newly sober Freddy Rumsen returns and provides the client Pond's Cold Cream in exchange for a job. Peggy is especially thrilled to have Freddy back, until she finds his copywriting ideas to be uninspired, dated and insulting—causing her to tell him that he is "old-fashioned." He is clearly hurt by the remark, but he brushes off Peggy's apology.

While Christmas tree shopping, Sally encounters Glen who indicates interest in getting close with her. He calls her house later in the week, pretending to be a classmate at school. He asks her about her parents' divorce, and Sally confesses her misery from living in the same house as before, but now without her father in it.

Lee Garner, Jr., the representative for Lucky Strike, calls Roger and invites himself to the office Christmas party. Since Lucky Strike represents 73% of all SCDP billings, the party must be changed to a lavish affair catered specifically to Garner. Joan quickly puts the event together in hours, assisted by the staff, including new-hire Megan. Garner gets drunk and becomes increasingly unpleasant, ultimately publicly humiliating Roger by forcing him to dress up as Santa for the office. As Don prepares to leave, Faye confronts him about his leaving her presentation early and disregarding the importance of consumer research. She posits that advertising boils down "what I want vs. what is expected of me." He apologizes and asks her out to dinner, but she declines. She comforts him by telling him that he'll "be married again in a year" which shocks Don.

Glen breaks into the Francis house with a friend and vandalizes it—breaking things and dumping trash and food everywhere. The family returns home and is distressed at the state of their house. Betty offers to let Sally sleep in her room, but Sally discovers her room is untouched—except for a bracelet that reveals to her who the culprit was. She smiles, pleased.

Don returns to his apartment, only to realize he forgot his keys at work. He tries to knock on Phoebe's door, but she is not home, so he calls his secretary, Allison. When she arrives, Don hits on her and the two have sex—a line Don has never crossed before.

The next day, the office is in shambles after the party, and Don and Roger commiserate over having to degrade themselves to appeal to Garner and their clients. Peggy apologizes again to Freddy and discusses her situation with her boyfriend with him. He advises her not to sleep with him until marriage if she wants him to respect her, but that if she is unsure about marriage, she should not lead him on as that is physically uncomfortable for him. Allison eagerly greets Don in his office. However, he merely thanks her for bringing his keys and hints that they are to pretend their encounter never happened. He gives her a $100 bonus that thanks her for her hard work, leaving her feeling rejected and hurt.

As the episode ends, Peggy is revealed to have slept with Mark, who continues to believe he is Peggy's first time. She remains uncertain about their relationship and her decision. The final shot shows Don gathering the presents for his children.

== Production ==
The title "Christmas Comes But Once a Year" is from the title of an original Stan Freberg song mocking the advertising industry on his 1958 comedy single, "Green Christmas" (Freberg's title is borrowed from the 1936 animated short of the same name).

The episode was written by executive producer Matthew Weiner, who has written a number of episodes, and Tracy McMillan. It was directed by Michael Uppendahl, who had directed three previous episodes of the series. The episode also saw the return of Joel Murray in the role of Freddy Rumsen, for the first time since the season two episode "Six Month Leave".

Pond's Cold Cream, the account brought in by Rumsen, is a real-life product by Unilever. This product placement was not meant to promote Pond's itself but was intended as a tie-in for a commercial for Dove soap, another Unilever product. This commercial featured actors reminiscent of the characters from the show and ran during a commercial break of the episode's original screening. The deal between Unilever and AMC included six different spots, for six different products, running over the course of the season.

== Reception ==
"Christmas Comes But Once a Year" had a total of 2.473 million viewers, and a 0.8 share of adults between 18 and 49. This was a drop from the season premiere, which had a viewership of 2.918 and a 0.9 share. The second episode aired directly after the premiere of AMC's third original series (after Mad Men and Breaking Bad), Rubicon, which was the station's most-watched original series premiere ever, with two million viewers.

The fourth season of Mad Men opened to universal acclaim from critics, gaining a score of 92 out of 100 on the review aggregation site Metacritic. Reviews for the second episode were positive, although somewhat more muted. James Poniewozik at Time appreciated the return of several characters that had been absent for a while, particularly Marten Weiner (Matthew Weiner's son) in the role of Glen. Moira Macdonald, writing for The Seattle Times, found it "not an entirely satisfying episode", though she enjoyed little details, such as the subtle development of the relationship between Don and Peggy. In the same vein William Bradley, writing for The Huffington Post, considered the episode good, "but not one of the classics, and a step back from the season premiere." Bradley warned against reading too much into Don Draper's decline, reminding readers that Weiner "likes to toy with expectations."
