= The Good News (Mad Men) =

- Mad Men episode
- Episode no.: Season 4 Episode 3
- Directed by: Jennifer Getzinger
- Written by: Jonathan Abrahams; Matthew Weiner
- Original air date: August 8, 2010
- Running time: 48 minutes

Guest appearances
- Melinda Page Hamilton as Anna Draper; Caity Lotz as Stephanie; Samuel Page as Dr. Greg Harris; Susan Leslie as Patty; Erin Cummings as Candace; Will Janowitz as Comedian; Remy Auberjonois as Dr. Emerson; Alexa Alemanni as Allison; Bayne Gibby as Sandy Schmidt

Episode chronology
← Previous "Christmas Comes But Once a Year"	Next → "The Rejected"
- Mad Men season 4

"The Good News" is the third episode of the fourth season of the American television drama series Mad Men, and the 42nd overall episode of the series. It was written by Jonathan Abrahams and series creator and executive producer Matthew Weiner, and directed by Jennifer Getzinger. It aired originally on the AMC channel in the United States on August 8, 2010. The episode contained guest appearances by, among others, Melinda Page Hamilton as Anna Draper and Samuel Page as Greg Harris.

In the episode, Don Draper (Jon Hamm) makes a trip to California to visit an old friend, where he receives bad news. Back in New York, he takes Lane Pryce (Jared Harris) out for a wild night on the town. Meanwhile, Joan Harris (Christina Hendricks) is having problems both at work and at home.

Advance copies of the episode were not sent to critics because of Weiner's fear of spoilers. Once the reviews came out, they were split on the value of the California storyline, but more consistent in lauding the comedy of Don and Lane's adventure.

== Plot ==
It is the end of 1964, and Don Draper (Jon Hamm) is planning a holiday trip to Acapulco. On the way, he has a 24-hour stop-over in Los Angeles, to visit Anna Draper (Melinda Page Hamilton). He finds Anna – the wife of the man whose identity Don stole – on the porch with a broken leg. Anna's sister Patty (Susan Leslie) comes over to help with the chores, with her daughter Stephanie (Caity Lotz), who is in college. Stephanie stays behind when Patty leaves, and the three go out for dinner. In the evening, Don drives Stephanie home and makes a pass at her in her driveway. She turns him down and instead tells him that Anna has cancer but does not know it. Don decides to extend his visit, and the next morning, he angrily confronts Patty about the secrecy and says he will pay for any possible treatment. Patty replies that they have already consulted experts, who all agree the cancer is terminal and advanced. She asks him to stay out of the family's business and to leave before he inadvertently tells Anna the real story. Don reluctantly decides to acquiesce. He tells Anna he has to leave and returns to New York, instead of going to Acapulco. Before leaving, he paints over Anna's water stained wall, on which she paints a flower and he inscribes, "Dick + Anna '64".

Meanwhile, Joan Harris (Christina Hendricks) consults an OB/GYN about the possibility of getting pregnant, despite having had two prior abortions. He assures her there should be no problems but is puzzled by the timing, since her husband Greg (Samuel Page) will soon be shipped off to Vietnam. Back at the office, she asks Lane Pryce (Jared Harris) for time off in early January, since Greg is on duty over Christmas, but Lane brusquely refuses. Later, Joan is highly provoked to receive roses from Lane with a note saying: "Darling, I've been an ass. Kisses, Lane." He assures her the note was intended for his wife, to whom he'd also sent roses, and hypothesizes that his secretary must have mixed up the cards; upon learning of the error Joan promptly fires Lane's secretary. At home, Greg tells Joan to take the time off anyway; the two argue, and he storms out. Later they make up, and Joan accidentally cuts her finger. Despite her desire to be taken to the hospital, Greg pressures Joan into letting him stitch the wound, saying that for him, this is like filing papers for her (she corrects him to point out that she has people do that for her).

Back in New York, on New Year's Day, Don encounters Lane in the office and takes him out for a movie and dinner. Lane confides that his wife has left him, that he is not sure if he should get "on that plane." Don counters Lane's comment by repeating the line from Episode 2, "Is that what you want or is that what people expect of you". Don persuades him to come along and meet a couple of call girls. After meeting the girls at a comedy club, Lane spends the night in Don's apartment with one of the girls. In the morning he thanks Don for the "welcome distraction" and leaves. Back at the office, the executive staff convenes for a meeting. Joan opens with the words: "Gentlemen, shall we begin 1965?"

== Production ==
After sending out advance copies of the season premiere to the media, Matthew Weiner was angered by what he considered spoilers in subsequent reviews. As a result, advance copies were not issued for later episodes. James Poniewozik, in his television blog for Time magazine, called AMC and Weiner's handling of the matter "insane". The channel released a promotional clip from the third episode containing a major plot detail, so in Poniewozik's opinion, they were contradicting the spoiler policy they were trying to force on others.

In an interview with TV Guide given prior to the screening of "The Good News", actress Christina Hendricks revealed that her character Joan would figure more prominently in the fourth season than she had in the third. Hendricks saw Joan as someone who experienced "a lot of conflict at home", but still managed to put on a cheerful exterior at work, and be a stabilizing force in the often tumultuous workplace. She also believed that the new office layout reflected the importance of the office manager, where she was positioned in an office with glass walls on the middle of the floor, with a full view of everything going on.

== First appearance ==
- Stephanie Horton: Patty's daughter and Anna and the deceased Lt. Draper's niece who has come to visit her because of her cancer.

== Final appearance ==
- Candace: A prostitute who regularly gives her services to Don Draper.

== Historical error ==
Although this episode takes place at the end of 1964, the film that Draper and Pryce see, Gamera: The Giant Monster was not released until 1965, and not released in the United States until 1966.

== Reception ==
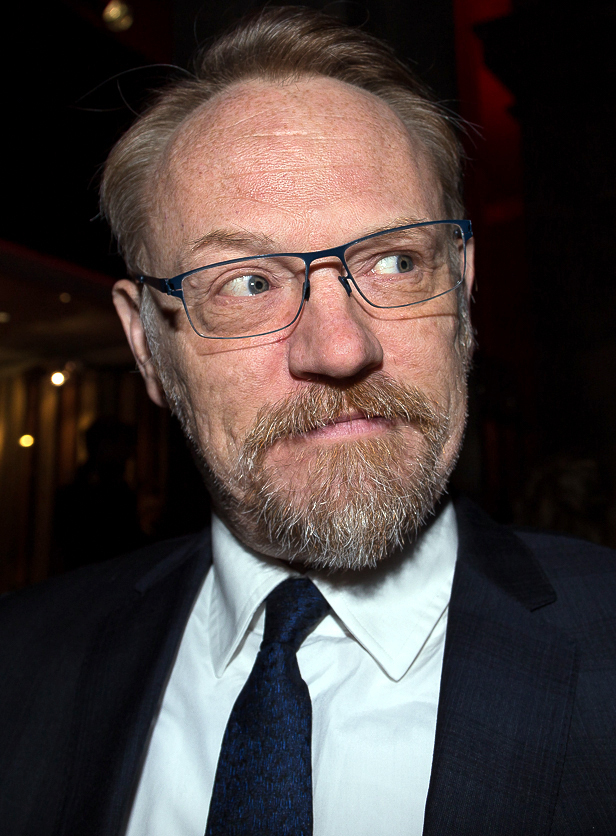
Jared Harris was praised by multiple commentators for his performance in the episode.

On its original American broadcast on August 8, 2010, on AMC, the episode was viewed by 2.22 million people.

The episode received very approving reviews from critics. Scott Tobias, reviewing the episode for The A.V. Club, gave it a grade "A", calling it a "wonderful, tonally dexterous episode". He especially appreciated the "heartbreaking" scenes between Anna and Don, and the "fucking great" scenes with Don and Lane. Mark Dawidziak, of the Cleveland newspaper The Plain Dealer, also found the episode both "heartbreaking and humorous". He pointed to the scene with Don and Lane in the movie theater as the funniest one, and Don's goodbye to Anna as the most heartbreaking. Slate's John Swansburg was less impressed, writing: "For the first time this season, Mad Men bored me." He found the return of Anna and the entire California story line unappealing. On the other hand, Swansburg enjoyed the "truly hilarious night of debauchery" Don and Lane enjoyed. Matt Zoller Seitz, writing for The New Republic, was even more scathing in his criticism, calling "The Good News" "The show's first truly bad episode." He further termed it "easily the most awkwardly written, clumsily paced and disposable hour it has ever aired." Though he did enjoy some parts of Don and Lane's night out, he found this also ultimately awkward, while he believed Christina Hendricks was not given enough screen time and good dialogue to fully play out the drama of her situation.

Devon Thomas, reviewing the episode for CBS News, called the episode "strange", but appreciated the return of Joan to the story line. James Poniewozik of TIME magazine acknowledged the fact that viewers had previously been divided on the episodes of the show that have taken place in California. In this case, however, he appreciated the contrast, echoing Lane's words of "a welcome distraction". He also enjoyed seeing Jared Harris, in the role of Lane, having the chance to display a different side of his character. The New York Times' Ginia Bellafante felt the episode was not as "thematically tight" as the show at its best but reflected the view of other critics that it contained some of the most humorous scenes in the show's history. Bellafante, like Poniewozik, also commended Jared Harris for his performance. Meanwhile, Ben Kenigsberg pronounced himself a fan of the show's "Los Angeles interludes" in a Time Out Chicago review. He also enjoyed the "comic balance to the tragedy of the Anna announcement" provided by the night out in New York, as well as Joan's husband's "first non-loathsome scene".
