= Waldorf Stories =

- Mad Men episode
- "Waldorf Stories" features flashback sequences to the 1950s, and further expands on the past affair between a young Joan Holloway (Christina Hendricks) and Roger Sterling (John Slattery).
- Episode no.: Season 4 Episode 6
- Directed by: Scott Hornbacher
- Written by: Brett Johnson; Matthew Weiner
- Original air date: August 29, 2010
- Running time: 48 minutes

Guest appearances
- Cara Buono as Dr. Faye Miller; Kevin Rahm as Ted Chaough; Matt Long as Joey Baird; Jessica Pare as Megan Calvet; Jay R. Ferguson as Stan Rizzo; Danny Strong as Danny Siegel; John Aniston as Wallace Harriman; Randee Heller as Ida Blankenship; Mark Moses as Herman "Duck" Phillips; Tim De Zarn as Jim Anderson; Becky Wahlstrom as Doris

Episode chronology
← Previous "The Chrysanthemum and the Sword"	Next → "The Suitcase"
- Mad Men season 4

"Waldorf Stories" is the sixth episode of the fourth season of the American television drama series Mad Men, and the 45th overall episode of the series. It was written by Brett Johnson and series creator and executive producer Matthew Weiner, and directed by Scott Hornbacher. The episode originally aired on the AMC channel in the United States on August 29, 2010. This was the same evening that Mad Men received the award for Outstanding Drama Series at the 2010 Primetime Emmy Awards.

== Plot ==
In April 1965, the firm has been nominated for CLIO Awards for Don Draper's Glo-Coat commercial; Don, Roger Sterling, Pete Campbell, and Joan Harris attend the ceremony, while Peggy Olson is upset at not receiving due credit for her role in the ad; she is also clashing with new art director Stan Rizzo, who rankles her with his flippant and misogynist attitude. She and Don interview a mediocre copywriter, Danny Siegel, who is only there because he is Jane Sterling's cousin, later laughing at his ineptitude.

The firm wins the Clio, and Roger and Don, already drunk at the ceremony, return to the office and crash a meeting with Life Cereal already in progress, to Pete's discomfort. Don drunkenly presents the pitch, which echoes his poignant pitch to Kodak from the first season, but the Life representatives reject it. Undeterred, Don pitches a series of ad libbed slogans, one of which, "the cure for the common breakfast", Life buys; Peggy is the only one who realises that Don has inadvertently stolen the line from Danny. When she tries to tell him, he cuts her off and demands she be "shut in" a hotel room with Stan until they finish their work on Vicks cough drops.

Pete Campbell finds out that Lane Pryce is trying to hire Ken Cosgrove, and is upset. Lane explains the firm's need for Ken to help increase sales, due to Pete being the only partner bringing in new business, and reaffirming Pete's importance as a partner. Pete is reassured, but insists that Ken first meet with him privately.

Don and Roger continue their drunken reverie, and Don ends up home with a woman he met at the bar; he blacks out, only to be awoken by a phone call from an angry Betty Francis. He has forgotten to pick up his children, and realizes it is Sunday, and that he has no recollection of Saturday; he is also with a different woman, who refers to him as Dick. Peggy visits Don to advise him the slogan he pitched to Life was Danny's and to insist that he make it right. Shortly after, Don passes out again.

On Monday, Don is surprised to see Danny is waiting for him in his office. He attempts to buy the slogan but Danny refuses the offer of money, insisting he wants a job. Don gives in to his demand, not bothering to hide his disgust, much to Peggy's surprise and annoyance. At their meeting, Pete agrees to accept Ken into the firm, on the condition that Ken acknowledges that they are no longer equals; Ken, desperate to escape his present firm and realizing Pete is serious, agrees.

Throughout the episode, we flashback to 1953 to see how Roger met Don when the latter was working as a fur salesman and Roger is buying a fur for his mistress, Joan. When Don learns that Roger works in advertising, he tries to give him his resume and portfolio, but Roger throws them out. The next day, Don accosts him in the lobby of Sterling Cooper, angling for a job. Roger agrees to go out with him for drinks, and the next day, Don shows up in the lobby and claims Roger had hired him the day before. A puzzled Roger has no memory of what really happened, and Don smiles to himself, having hustled his way into Sterling Cooper.

== First appearances ==
- Danny Siegel: Roger's wife's (Jane) cousin and a new hire to SCDP's creative department.
- Stan Rizzo: SCDP's new creative art director who becomes at odds with Peggy and also helped with the LBJ campaign.

== Reception ==
On its original American broadcast on August 29, 2010, on AMC, the episode was viewed by 2.04 million people.

The episode received very positive reviews from most critics. John Swansburg, reviewing the episode for Slate, appreciated the episode as an opportunity to "explore in greater detail a series of related questions" the season had presented so far. This included the relation between the old, experienced employees at the firm and the younger, more ambitious ones. He also highlighted the scene where Peggy chastises Don for his misappropriation of the slogan, as an example of how reduced Don has become as a man. Walter Dellinger of The Wall Street Journal wondered whether Weiner had "lost control of this show", with Don's dramatic emotional swings. He did, however, enjoy Peggy's redeeming herself by humiliating Stan, after initially feeling under-appreciated at the firm. TIME's James Poniewozik gave the episode a generally good review, praising the "small details in the flashback scenes". On the other hand, he did find some of the "lighter elements", such as the challenging secretary Mrs. Blankenship, somewhat out of place in the show.
