= Blowing Smoke (Mad Men) =

- Mad Men episode
- Episode no.: Season 4 Episode 12
- Directed by: John Slattery
- Written by: Andre Jacquemetton; Maria Jacquemetton
- Original air date: October 10, 2010
- Running time: 48 minutes

Guest appearances
- John Ales as Perry Demuth; Cara Buono as Dr. Faye Miller; Jessica Paré as Megan Calvet; Christopher Stanley as Henry Francis; Alison Brie as Trudy Campbell; Danny Strong as Danny Siegel; Jay R. Ferguson as Stan Rizzo; John Aylward as Geoffrey Atherton; Kevin Rahm as Ted Chaough; Patricia Bethune as Dr. Edna Keener; John Sloman as Raymond Geiger

Episode chronology
← Previous "Chinese Wall"	Next → "Tomorrowland"
- Mad Men season 4

"Blowing Smoke" is the twelfth episode of the fourth season of the American television drama series Mad Men, and the 51st overall episode of the series. It aired on the AMC channel in the United States on October 10, 2010. At the 63rd Primetime Emmy Awards, Robert Morse was nominated for the Primetime Emmy Award for Outstanding Guest Actor in a Drama Series for his performance in this episode; Andre and Maria Jaccquemetton were nominated for the Primetime Emmy Award for Outstanding Writing for a Drama Series for their teleplay.

== Plot ==
Don Draper meets with a representative from Heinz to discuss moving the beans, vinegar, and sauces line of business to Sterling Cooper Draper Pryce but is dismayed when the potential client says he will hear ideas from SCDP in six to eight months, as he has doubts about the agency's immediate future. At the office, the partners talk with an advisor, Geoffrey Atherton (Faye Miller's business partner), who recommends they replace Lucky Strike with a new business immediately to avoid being seen as stagnant or decaying. Atherton arranges for SCDP a meeting with Philip Morris, but the company cancels on the day, having only scheduled the meeting to exert pricing leverage with their existing agency Leo Burnett Worldwide.

Lane extends the agency's bank loan to bridge the loss of Lucky Strike revenues, which requires an investment of $100,000 from each senior partner (Don, Roger, and Burt), and $50,000 from each junior partner (Lane and Pete). Pete cannot afford the investment and applies for a loan, but when Trudy learns of it, she forbids Pete to borrow from the bank or her father and encourages him to leave SCDP.

Don runs into his ex-girlfriend, Midge Daniels (Rosemarie DeWitt) in the Time-Life Building lobby; she invites Don home for dinner and introduces him to her husband, Perry, who inadvertently reveals that Midge had tracked Don down. Midge, who wants to sell Don one of her paintings, confesses that she and her husband are heroin addicts and that they will use any money they get out of Don for drugs. He buys her painting for $120.

Without consulting the other partners, Don writes a letter, which he places as a full-page ad in The New York Times, to publicly say that he is relieved to no longer be advertising a fatal and addictive product like tobacco. The other partners are livid, and an angry Cooper abruptly resigns; only Megan and Peggy Olson see the value in it. Don meets with Peggy and asks her to approve a list of the people in the Creative Department who need to be dismissed, and the firm begins downsizing.

SCDP receives a call from the American Cancer Society, inquiring about launching an anti-cigarette campaign. The work is pro bono, but the other partners point out the client is prestigious, and that many of the society's board members are bigwigs and potential new clients. Pete is still angry with Don, until Lane lets slip that Don has covered his (Pete's) $50,000 partnership investment.

Dr. Edna tells Betty that Sally has made excellent progress and should now see her only once a week. This dismays Betty, who has been unconsciously using Dr. Edna as her own psychiatrist. Later, Betty is angered to learn that Sally and Glen have been talking in private. At the dinner table, Betty suggests to Henry that they move to another town, and Henry agrees. Sally runs up to her room, heartbroken.

== Cultural references ==
- The title refers, at once, three concepts:
  - The act of smoking, which corresponds to the firm's chasing tobacco clients as well as the numerous characters' continuing to light up
  - The haze of romance through which the episode viewed the agency's work situation
  - Saying things that are untrue in order to make oneself or something one's involved in seem better than it is. Time magazine's TV critic, James Poniewozik, devoted his review to the many examples of this behavior throughout the episode.
- Sally Draper describes to Glen Bishop the infinite-loop motif, or Droste effect, on the Land O'Lakes butter packaging, which features an Indigenous woman holding the butter box.
- The morning Don's anti-tobacco letter appears in The New York Times, Megan Calvet informs him he has received a phone call from Emerson Foote. Alan Sepinwall observes: "One of Don's other phone messages was from Emerson Foote, an advertising giant who in 1965 quit his job as chairman of McCann-Erickson because he didn't want to represent tobacco anymore", and who, as Keith Phipps observes: "devoted himself to anti-smoking advocacy. (He later came back.) Foote was of the generation before Don's and, unlike Don, he hated the cigarette industry in earnest."
- Don invites Faye to dinner at La Caravelle, an "august" French restaurant that - along with Le Pavillon, and La Côte Basque, was an offshoot "of the seminal restaurant in the French pavilion of the 1939 New York World's Fair, where [Charles] Masson père began as a waiter under the eye of the legendary Henri Soulé".

== Reception ==
Viewership for "Blowing Smoke" rose from the previous episode as 2.23 million viewers tuned in on the night of the original airing, while 0.7 million viewers in the adults 18-49 age demographic watched the episode.
