= The Chrysanthemum and the Sword (Mad Men) =

- Mad Men episode
- Episode no.: Season 4 Episode 5
- Directed by: Lesli Linka Glatter
- Written by: Erin Levy
- Original air date: August 22, 2010
- Running time: 48 minutes

Guest appearances
- Patricia Bethune as Edna Keener; Cara Buono as Faye Miller; Anna Camp as Bethany van Nuys; Randee Heller as Miss Blankenship; Sab Shimono as Ichiro Kamura

Episode chronology
| ← Previous "The Rejected" | Next → "Waldorf Stories" |
- Mad Men season 4

"The Chrysanthemum and the Sword" is the fifth episode of the fourth season of the American television drama series Mad Men, and the 44th overall episode of the series. It was written by Erin Levy and directed by Lesli Linka Glatter, and it originally aired on the AMC channel in the United States on August 22, 2010.

== Plot ==
It's now March 1965. Pete Campbell reports to other partners of Sterling Cooper Draper Pryce that the Honda Motorcycle Corporation is unhappy with their current agency, Grey Advertising, and Pete has used his network to set up a meeting with Honda. Roger Sterling, a veteran who served and lost friends in the Pacific theater of World War II, refuses to do business with the Japanese, but the other partners agree to pursue Honda while keeping Roger out of the loop. Meanwhile, creative director Ted Chaough of CGC, who sees himself as an upcoming rival to Don Draper, has already picked up two of SCDP's most recently lost clients (Clearasil and jai alai) and has his sights on Honda as well.

Honda's representatives visit SCDP's offices, but Roger discovers the carefully planned meeting and sabotages it, insulting the Japanese delegates to their faces. Afterward, Don and Pete are furious with Roger, and Don agrees with Pete that Roger is trying to preserve his indispensable status at SCDP by maintaining the unchallenged primacy of his client Lucky Strike. Bert Cooper and Joan Harris both independently advise Roger to bite the bullet so that SCDP can still have a chance to win the competition for Honda's business.

Don conceives of a plan wherein SCDP will pretend to shoot a lavish Honda motorcycle commercial to win the account (violating the rules set for the competition by Honda, which stipulated no finished work in the final presentation), allowing details of the shoot to leak to Ted at CGC so that he will try to outdo SCDP's ad. At the presentation, Don tells the Japanese that he is withdrawing SCDP from consideration, letting them know that he considered the contest dishonorable because Honda had entertained a bid from a rival agency (CGC) that broke the rules with a finished ad, and paying them back with $3,000 from his personal account. The Japanese are ashamed of themselves and impressed with Don, and ultimately Pete learns Honda was never planning to leave Grey, but SCDP now will have first shot at marketing Honda's upcoming line of automobiles. Pryce is uneasy with Don's tactics but ultimately praises his good work.

Meanwhile, on an evening when Don has custody of his two older children, Sally cuts her own hair "to look pretty" when the babysitter, Don's neighbor Phoebe, is not paying attention. Don's ex-wife Betty is furious with Don and Sally, and becomes angry with Sally again when the 10-year-old girl is caught masturbating to David McCallum at a friend's house during a sleepover. Henry and Betty decide to have Sally see a child psychiatrist, Dr. Edna Keener.

Don shares a bottle of sake with Dr. Faye Miller and confides about his inner conflict on single fatherhood, as she reveals that she is not actually married but pretends to be in order to ward off men's advances.

When first meeting the psychiatrist, Betty discloses some of her own insecurities. Dr. Edna suggests that Betty see a therapist of her own, and when Betty declines, Dr. Edna asks to meet with Betty in one session each month, ostensibly to report on Sally's progress.

== Cultural references ==
The title of the episode is a direct reference to The Chrysanthemum and the Sword: Patterns of Japanese Culture (1946), by anthropologist Ruth Benedict. Benedict wrote the influential study of Japan at the invitation of the U.S. Office of War Information in order to understand and predict the behavior of the Japanese in World War II by referencing a series of contradictions in traditional culture. The book was influential in shaping American ideas about Japanese culture during the occupation of Japan, and it popularized the distinction between guilt cultures and shame cultures.

At one point, Pete Campbell describes an event as a "Margaret Dumont-sized disaster", a reference to the death of the actress in the same month that the episode is set, March 1965.

== First appearances ==
- Dr. Edna Keener: A child psychologist who becomes Sally's psychiatrist hired by Betty after she can't control her behavior anymore.
- Ted Chaough: One of the owners of rival firm Cutler, Gleason and Chaough (CGC) and Don's self-proclaimed rival in the advertising world.

== Final appearances ==
- Phoebe: A nurse who lives near Don's apartment down the hallway in another apartment and who also babysits Sally and Bobby for him.
- Smitty Smith: A former employee and copywriter of Sterling-Cooper who did not move into SCDP and is now working for rival advertising firm CGC.

== Reception ==
On its original American broadcast on August 22, 2010, on AMC, the episode was viewed by 2.19 million people.

Erin Levy won the 2011 Writers Guild of America Award for Television: Episodic Drama for her work on this episode.
