= Emerson Foote =

American advertising executive (1906–1992)

Chairman of McCann-Erickson
- In office 1962–1964

President of McCann-Erickson
- In office 1960–1963

Vice President of McCann-Erickson
- In office 1951–1957
- Succeeded by: Paul Foley (1963)

Personal details
- Born: December 13, 1906 Sheffield, Alabama, U.S.
- Died: July 5, 1992 (aged 85) Carmel, New York, U.S.
- Spouse: Sabina Fromhold (m. 1938; died 1985)
- Children: 4
- Education: University of Southern California

Emerson Adonijah Foote (December 13, 1906 – July 5, 1992) was an American business and advertising executive who served as former chairman of McCann-Erickson. Foote later became an anti-smoking activist after resigning from McCann-Erickson.

== Early life ==
Emerson Foote was born on December 13, 1906 in Sheffield, Alabama. He graduated from Los Angeles High School in June 1922. Foote then enrolled at the University of Southern California in 1924.

== Career ==
Foote first worked on tobacco accounts in December 1938, for the American Tobacco Company. In 1942, Foote was a co-founder of Foote, Cone & Beldin.

In 1948, Foote caused controversy when as president of Foote, Cone & Beldin, cancelled a $12 million Lucky Strike account. Foote served as president of Foote, Cone & Beldin until 1950.

Foote joined McCann-Erickson on October 19, 1951 as vice president and served in that capacity until 1957. He was named president of McCann-Erickson in 1960 and served until 1963. Foote was named chairman in 1963.

In 1964, Foote resigned as chairman from McCann-Erickson due to his opposition handling cigarette accounts. Foote was later elected the first chairman of the National Interagency Council on Smoking and Health and took office on December 1, 1964. Foote was also a life member of the board of directors of the American Cancer Society.

== Personal life ==
Foote suffered from stuttering and bipolar disorder. Foote was a former chain-smoker and quit around 1959. Foote married his wife, Sabina Fromhold, on April 18, 1938. His wife predeceased him in 1985. They had four children: one son and three daughters. Foote died on July 5, 1992, in Carmel, New York, at age 85 due to complications from an appendicitis operation.

== In popular culture ==
Foote is referenced in the AMC series Mad Men in the episode Blowing Smoke, when Don Draper after losing the Lucky Strike account, issues an ad for The New York Times, "Why I'm Quitting Tobacco".

== Books ==
- Foote, Emerson. (2014). The Lost Diary of a Real Mad Man: Tales of Advertising & Mental Health, American Academy of Advertising, ISBN 978-0-931030-47-5 (posthumously)

== See also ==
- FCB
- McCann
