= Jonathan Abrahams =

American television writer and producer

Jonathan Abrahams is an American television writer and producer. He has worked for a number of television series, including Greek, Mad Men, Haven, Wildfire, and Raising the Bar.

== Greek episodes ==
- "War and Peace" (1.14)
- "Engendered Species" (2.13)

== Raising the Bar episodes ==
- "Guatemala Gulfstream" (1.02)
- "Bagels and Locks" (1.05)
- "Out on the Roof" (1.08)
- "Hair Apparent" (2.01)
- "Is There a Doctor In the House?" (2.05)
- "Trout Fishing" (2.09)
- "Maybe, Baby" (2.13)

== Mad Men episodes ==
- "The Good News" (4.03; with Matthew Weiner)
- "Hands and Knees" (4.10; with Matthew Weiner)

== Haven episodes ==
- "Sparks and Recreation" (2.04)
- "Who, What, Where, Wendigo?" (2.10)
- "301" (3.01)

== Rescue: HI-Surf episodes ==
- "Ripple Effect" (1.14)

== Awards and nominations ==
In 2011, Abrahams won both a Writers Guild of America Award and a Primetime Emmy Award for his work on the fourth season of Mad Men.
