= Andre Jacquemetton =

American television writer and producer

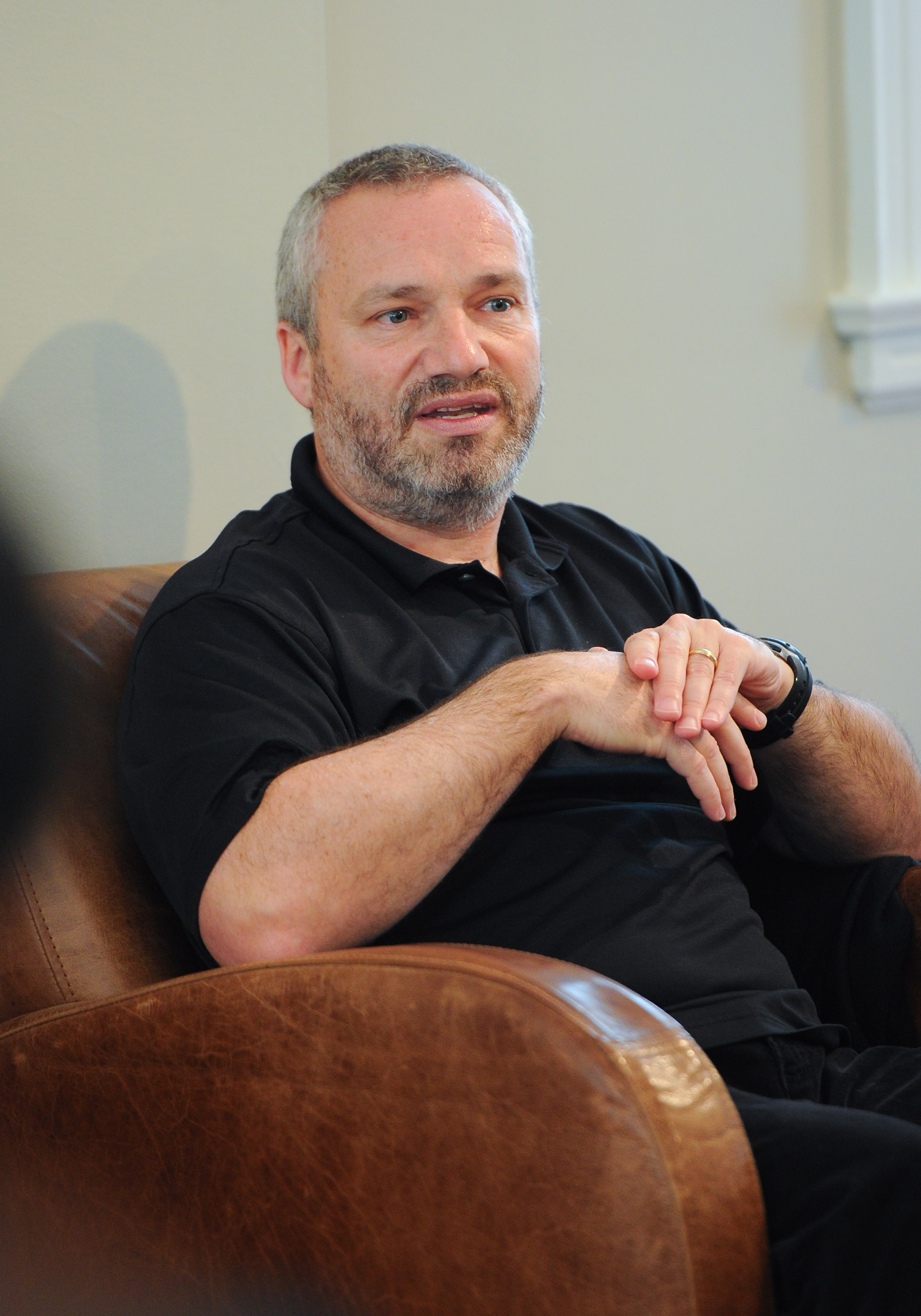
- Andre Jacquemetton in 2012
- Occupations: Television writer and producer
- Spouse: Maria Mastras
- Relatives: George Mastras (brother-in-law)
- Writing career
- Notable work: Mad Men

Andre Jacquemetton is an American television writer and producer. He served as a producer for the first and second season of Mad Men. He and his wife, Maria, co-wrote episodes of the first and second seasons. Alongside his colleagues on the writing staff, he won a Writers Guild of America Award for Best New Series and was nominated for the award for Best Dramatic Series at the February 2008 ceremony for his work on the season. He returned as a producer for the second season and continued to write episodes. He was nominated for the WGA award for Best Dramatic Series a second time at the February 2009 ceremony for his work on the second season. He won the WGA Award for Best Drama Series (after being nominated for the third consecutive year) at the February 2010 ceremony for his work on the third season.

He has been nominated for a Primetime Emmy Award for Outstanding Writing for a Drama Series for co-writing the episodes "Six Month Leave", "Blowing Smoke", and "Commissions and Fees".

Prior to Mad Men the Jacquemettons wrote for other series including Jack of All Trades, Relic Hunter, and Star Trek: Enterprise.
