= Maria Jacquemetton =

American screenwriter

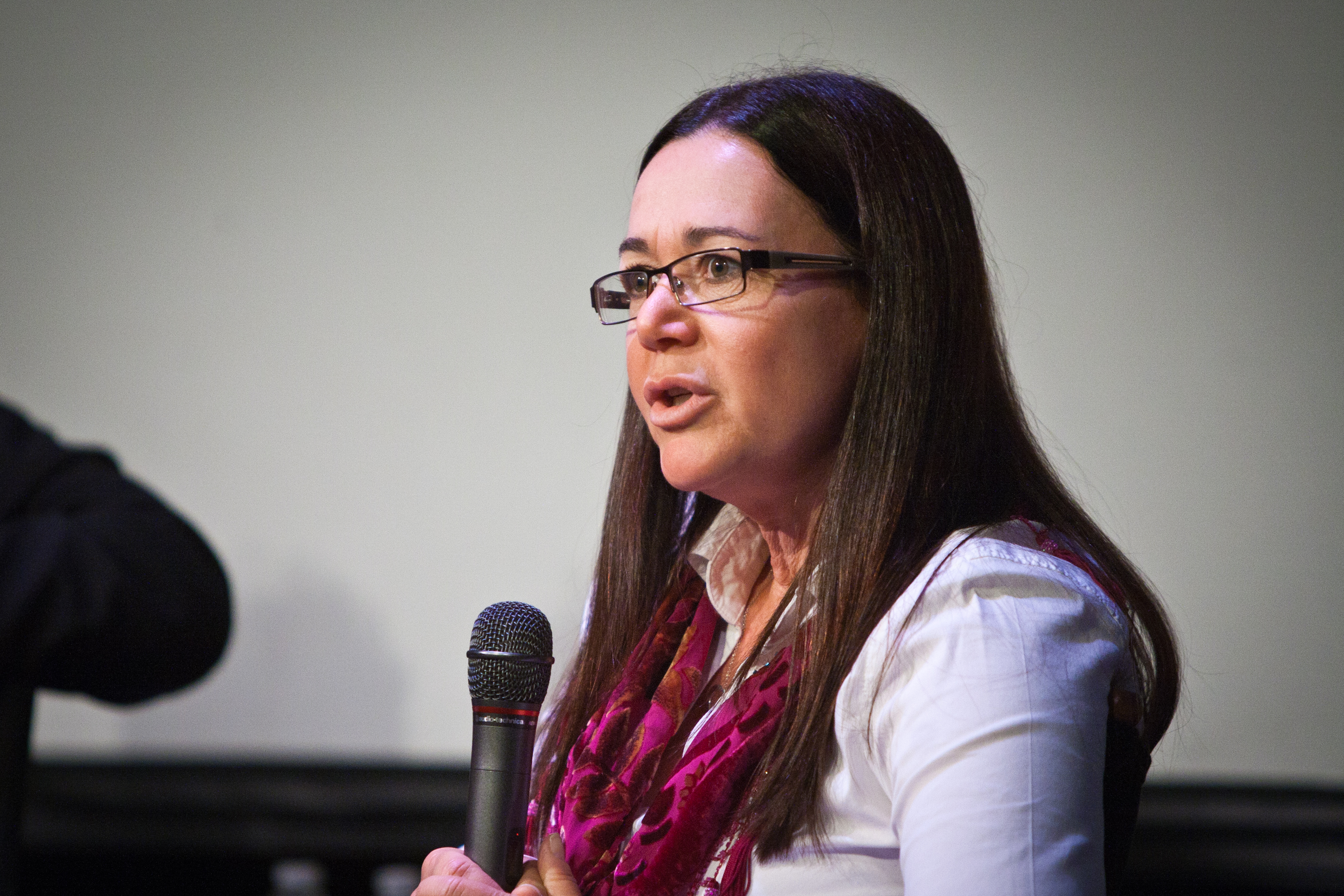
- Maria Jacquemetton in 2010
- Born: Maria Mastras
- Occupations: Television writer and producer
- Spouse: Andre Jacquemetton
- Relatives: George Mastras (brother)
- Writing career
- Notable work: Mad Men

Maria Jacquemetton (née Mastras) is an American television writer and producer. She graduated from Lehigh University in 1983. She served as a producer for the first season of Mad Men and co-wrote, with her husband, Andre, three episodes of the season.

Alongside her colleagues on the writing staff she won a Writers Guild of America Award for Best New Series and was nominated for the award for Best Dramatic Series at the February 2008 ceremony for her work on the season. She returned as a producer for the second season and continued to write episodes. She was nominated for the WGA award for Best Dramatic Series a second time at the February 2009 ceremony for her work on the second season. She won the WGA Award for Best Drama Series (after being nominated for the third consecutive year) at the February 2010 ceremony for her work on the third season.

She has been nominated for a Primetime Emmy Award for Outstanding Writing for a Drama Series for writing the episodes "Six Month Leave", "Blowing Smoke", and "Commissions and Fees".

== Family ==
Jacquemetton is the older sister of George Mastras, a novelist and scriptwriter for the AMC TV show Breaking Bad.
