= Alexa Alemanni =

American actress

- Occupations: Actress, Screenwriter, Producer
- Years active: 2005-present
- Known for: Mad Men

Alexa Alemanni is an American actress and screenwriter. She appeared as Allison, secretary to Don Draper on the AMC original series Mad Men (2007–2010).

== Life and career ==
Alemanni is a graduate of Vassar College with a bachelor's degree in theatre performance. On stage, she has appeared in the William Shakespeare comedies The Merchant of Venice (Portia) and Twelfth Night (Viola). She played Helen of Troy in an international touring production of The Oresteia that performed both in Athens, Greece, and Milan. She also performed as part of the ensemble with the Comedy Central Theater.

In 2005, Alemanni made her first TV appearance on The West Wing in the episode "365 Days" as an intern for White House Chief of Staff Leo McGarry. She also appears as Amy Deckerman, a murder victim in "Doubt", the third-season premiere episode of Criminal Minds.

She appeared in two small films that were shown at film festivals in 2008, La Milonga and Sanctuary, neither of which received a theatrical release.

Her first appearance on Mad Men was in the third episode of the first season, "The Marriage of Figaro". Alemanni appeared in three other episodes in the first season, but appeared only once in the second season. With her character having been installed as Don Draper's secretary, she appeared in 11 of the 13 episodes of season 3.

Alemanni was included among the cast of Mad Men as a winner at the 16th Screen Actors Guild Awards for Outstanding Performance by an Ensemble in a Drama Series. She was presented with an award along with other members of the cast.

Following her time on Mad Men, Alemanni transitioned into screenwriting and producing. She staffed as a writer on the TNT series The Librarians and has developed numerous feature projects, including Something Blue, a sequel to the film Something Borrowed, for Black Label Media, and an adaptation of Warren Adler's novel Serpent's Bite for Grey Eagle Films. She founded Bad Pitch Writers Lab, a screenwriting studio for emerging writers, and serves as an assistant adjunct professor of screenwriting at the USC School of Cinematic Arts.

== Filmography ==
=== Film ===
Year	Title	Role	Notes
2008	La milonga	Carlita	
2008	Sanctuary	Kris Carlson	
2014	She Was Quite Like a Daisy	Young Daisy	Short
2017	The Morning After	Lily	Short, completed
TBA	One Attempt Remaining	—N/a	Writer

=== Television ===
Year	Title	Role	Notes
2005	The West Wing	Leo's Intern	Episode: "365 Days"
2007	Criminal Minds	Amy Deckerman	Episode: "Doubt"
2007–2010	Mad Men	Allison	Recurring role, seasons 1–4
2014	The Librarians	Writer	Staff writer
2014	Necrolectric	Caitlyn	TV miniseries
2014	Masters of Sex	Maureen	Episode: "Fight"
2019	Lucifer	Lucy	Episode: "Save Lucifer"

=== Video Games ===
Year	Title	Role	Notes
2011	L.A. Noire	Elizabeth Eberly (voice)	
