= Christopher Stanley =

American actor

- Born: Providence, Rhode Island, U.S.
- Other name: Chris Stanley
- Occupation: Actor
- Years active: 1986–present
- Spouse: Kim Stanley

Christopher Stanley is an American film and television actor. He appeared in the Ben Affleck-directed film Argo and in the Kathryn Bigelow-directed film Zero Dark Thirty.

Stanley was born in Providence, Rhode Island. His most notable TV role was as politician Henry Francis, the second husband of Betty Francis (January Jones) on Mad Men. Stanley's role on Mad Men was recurring in the third and fourth seasons and a main cast member from the fifth season forward.

== Filmography ==
=== Film ===
| Year | Title | Role | Notes |
|---|---|---|---|
| 1991 | Death Merchants | Nick Biaggi | |
| 1994 | Kangaroo Court | Manzick | Short film |
| 1996 | Crosscut | Terry | |
| 2011 | The Terrain | Crane | Short film |
| 2012 | Argo | Thomas L. Ahern, Jr. | |
| 2012 | Zero Dark Thirty | Admiral Bill McRaven | |

=== Television ===
| Year | Title | Role | Notes |
|---|---|---|---|
| 1990 | Freddy's Nightmares | Todd Lawrence | Episode: "Prime Cut" |
| 1990–91 | DEA | Nick Biaggi | 13 episodes |
| 1996 | Silk Stalkings | Peter Ricci | Episode: "Sudden Death" |
| 1997 | The Practice | Officer Kent | Episode: "Race with the Devil" |
| 1997–98 | Brooklyn South | Officer Matt Heagan | 2 episodes |
| 1997–01 | NYPD Blue | Off. Szymanski | 4 episodes |
| 1998 | Martial Law | Scott Ruit | Episode: "Cop Out" |
| 1998–99 | Cracker | Dale | 3 episodes |
| 1999 | Promised Land | Det. Colette | Episode: "Under Cover" |
| 2001 | The X-Files | Agent Joe Farah | 2 episodes |
| 2001 | Family Law | Simon Rosen | Episode: "Obligations" |
| 2001 | Philly | Officer Tim Acavello | Episode: "Fork You Very Much" |
| 2004 | 24 | Bill | Episode: "Day 3: 3:00 a.m.-4:00 a.m." |
| 2008 | Boston Legal | CEO Robert Winthrop | Episode: "Rescue Me" |
| 2008 | In Plain Sight | Joe | 2 episodes |
| 2009 | Without a Trace | Hal Williams | Episode: "Skeletons" |
| 2009–15 | Mad Men | Henry Francis | 30 episodes |
| 2010 | Memphis Beat | Patrick Collins / Ray Pruitt | Episode: "It's All Right, Mama" |
| 2010 | Lie to Me | Agent Williams | Episode: "Exposed" |
| 2010 | The Defenders | Mark Cordell | 2 episodes |
| 2015 | Comedy Bang! Bang! | General Amos Halftrack | Episode: "Judd Apatow Wears a Polo and Blue Suede Shoes" |
| 2016 | American Crime | Charles | 3 episodes |
| 2016 | Lethal Weapon | Henry Ashworth | Episode: "Ties That Bind" |
| 2018 | Waco | Edward Wiggins | 3 episodes |
| 2018 | Kick | Lewis | |
| 2018-20 | Narcos: Mexico | Jack Lawn | 3 episodes |
| 2021 | American Horror Story: Double Feature | Sherman Adams | 2 episodes |
| 2023 | Paul T. Goldman | Alan Elkins | 4 episodes |
| 2025 | Landman | Eric McDougal | 2 Episodes |
