= Lane Pryce =

Fictional character from "Mad Men"

- Mad Men character
- Jared Harris as Lane Pryce
- First appearance: "Out of Town" (3.01)
- Last appearance: "Commissions and Fees" (5.12)
- Created by: Matthew Weiner
- Portrayed by: Jared Harris

In-universe information
- Occupation: Founding and Junior Partner and Financial Chief of Sterling Cooper Draper Pryce (former); Financial Chief of Sterling Cooper Advertising Agency for Puttnam, Powell, and Lowe (former)
- Family: Robert Pryce (father)
- Spouses: Rebecca Pryce
- Children: Nigel Pryce
- Nationality: British

Lane Pryce is a fictional character in the television series Mad Men, portrayed by Jared Harris.

A British newcomer to the United States as of 1963, he initially acts as financial officer at Sterling Cooper but eventually leaves along with a handful of his co-workers to form new agency Sterling Cooper Draper Pryce.

For his performance, Harris was nominated for the Primetime Emmy Award for Outstanding Supporting Actor in a Drama Series in 2012.

== Fictional character biography ==
=== Background and personality ===
Born in London on 10 May 1916, Lane was raised by middle-class traveling salesman Robert Pryce (W. Morgan Sheppard) in a strict and regimented home. Lane served in the British Army as a supply assistant in Rosyth and, although he never saw combat, was later thanked by a British veteran of World War II who said his resupply effort saved lives and reminded that "England expects every man to do his duty." After his military career, Lane attended accounting school and married a woman named Rebecca (Embeth Davidtz), with whom he had a son named Nigel. Some time later, he was hired by advertising agency Putnam Powell and Lowe, and was eventually promoted to an executive position responsible for mergers and takeovers.

Lane is shown to enjoy the newfound freedom that came with living in America, free from the rigidity of the social class structures of England. We see glimpses of how much he enjoys his new life in the USA; while his wife longs to return to England, lamenting NYC is nothing like London, he says — with understated delight — “yes, I’ve been here 10 months and no one’s ever asked me where I went to school” (a question still asked in Britain to place one’s social class to this day). He also struggles with the expectations placed upon him by the leadership of PPL to be subservient and eventually breaks free from them when he realises that, no matter how hard he works or how much he achieves for them, he will never be considered equal to his upper-class superiors and will be viewed as dispensable. He sometimes appears stiff and reserved. He does enjoy a drink but not as much as Don, who is known to drink during work hours. He is not particularly keen on football but was seen in a bar with fellow expats cheering England's performance in the 1966 World Cup Final. He was able to make contacts to set up a potential account with Jaguar.

=== Sterling Cooper ===
PPL sends Lane to recent acquisition Sterling Cooper and tasks him with trimming costs. He begins by firing many employees, including long-time employee and head of accounts Burt Peterson (Michael Gaston). He names Pete Campbell (Vincent Kartheiser) and Ken Cosgrove (Aaron Staton) as Burt's joint successors. Lane angers Creative Director Don Draper (Jon Hamm) and becomes isolated from the company when he expresses PPL's lack of interest in a potentially lucrative account with Madison Square Garden. Initially unaware of PPL's plans, he later learns that he was instructed to cut overheads so that the Sterling Cooper could be sold for a profit. Lane's superiors at PPL tell him that after the sale he is to be transferred to India. The plan is soon aborted after his would-be replacement's injury in a freak accident. Don, Roger Sterling (John Slattery) and Bertram Cooper (Robert Morse) convince him to join them in starting a new agency and make him a named partner in exchange for him "firing" the three of them in order to void their contracts' non-compete clauses that would otherwise prohibit their continued work in advertising.

=== Sterling Cooper Draper Pryce ===
Lane has a knack for managing company revenues and controlling costs, a talent that the other partners at the agency lack. Lane and office manager Joan Harris (Christina Hendricks) are credited with keeping the company running and managing the day-to-day operations.

In Season 4, Lane's marriage falls apart when Rebecca, who genuinely loves him, finds the strains of homesickness and culture shock too much to bear and returns with their son to London indefinitely. Lane and Don meet at work and then get drunk and go for a night out on the town, which includes seeing Gamera. Lane makes monster noises and slurred Japanese remarks to a woman in the audience, which Don considers hilarious. Lane then sleeps with a prostitute supplied by Don. Lane reimburses Don for the money he spent on the prostitute and thanks him for the "welcome distraction". When Lane's family is supposed to come to New York to see him, he is instead visited by his elderly father, who intends to bring Lane home to England to sort out his affairs. Around the same time, Lane begins a relationship with a young African-American Playboy Bunny named Toni (Naturi Naughton) and later introduces her to his father. His father beats Lane with his cane and orders him to return to London to reunite with his family. Lane takes a short leave-of-absence from the agency and later returns to New York with his family, who by now are more accepting of being overseas. Although he seems to have got his home life in order, Lane still has signs of a wandering eye, particularly when he finds a lost wallet. Lane does not touch any of the man's cash or credit cards but notices he has an attractive wife and keeps the wallet photo for himself prior to contacting the owner.

In Season 5, Lane faces severe financial troubles due to a tax demand and struggles to keep his balance at work. During his three years at Sterling Cooper Draper Pryce, it has been operating at a loss, and he struggles to turn the agency around. Though Lane and Joan are friendly compatriots responsible for keeping the company going, Lane often makes inappropriate sexual remarks that upset and disgust her. Lane later gets Joan a 5-percent speaking partnership. While ultimately in Joan's best long-term interests, Lane makes the suggestion to her as a means of covering up his embezzlement. Had she accepted the original cash offer, his theft would have been discovered. The partnership kept it concealed for a while longer.

=== Embezzlement and death ===
Lane's work has been vital, but he struggles to make ends meet. His investment in SCDP has yielded no return, for the agency has yet to make a profit. As a partner, Lane is required to invest a further $50,000 (approximately $435,000 in 2021 USD) in order to keep the company afloat when it loses the Lucky Strike account. He therefore liquidates the majority of his savings, which had been invested in securities with a British brokerage house causing another issue: high taxes in the UK. His lawyer despite lengthy negotiations tells him that he must pay $8,000 (approximately $70,000 in 2021 USD) in back taxes within two days or face jail. Lane does not have the money.

To pay the tax, Lane extends the company's line of credit by an additional $50,000 by presenting their projections as firm commitments and reports the borrowed money as a profit surplus to the other partners and proposes that it be spent on Christmas bonuses for all employees. His would conveniently be the amount he needs.

The plan is frustrated when Don delays payment of the bonuses until the Christmas party two weeks later, and Pete points out that they will need the funds as seed money for the Jaguar account should they land it. Unable to wait, Lane embezzles $7,500 from the company. He forges Don's signature on the Christmas bonus he expects to receive in two weeks’ time.

The business unexpectedly loses a large revenue stream when major client Mohawk Air suspends all advertising. The company will now need the "surplus" to cover costs until January and will not pay Christmas bonuses. This panics Lane. His lies to the bank are nearly uncovered when head of the Jaguar account Herb Rennet demands a night with Joan in exchange for choosing SCDP. Keen to win the account, the partners ask Lane to extend their line of credit to pay Joan for the act. They do not know that Lane has already done so and cannot borrow more. To avoid detection, he convinces Joan to request a 5-percent partnership stake instead of a one-time cash payment but grows uneasy when the partners do not change their minds about taking Christmas bonuses.

Bert discovers the forged cheque when he looks through unopened account statements. Bert confronts Don about the bonus paid to Lane when the partners had decided not to take bonuses. Don tells Bert that he will handle it but omits that he did not sign the cheque. When Don confronts Lane, Lane tries to lie his way out of it before he is forced to admit the truth. Don tells him that he should have told him. Erupting with anger, Lane says that he could not bear the shame of asking for a loan, and has never been adequately compensated for his contribution to the agency. He feels owed and entitled to the money and meant it to be a two-week loan, but was frustrated by the announcement that the partners would not receive bonuses. He then makes a snide remark about Don's jet-set lifestyle, and tries to justify his own fraudulent actions. Don, however, has lost all trust in him. He agrees to cover the $7,500 himself and not tell the police or the other partners, but informs Lane that he is fired, and gives him the weekend to "think of an elegant exit" before handing in his resignation on Monday. Don offers comfort and assures Lane that he can start again somewhere else. Being fired will not cancel Lane’s share in the company but will lose him his visa. He will have to return to the UK. On his way out of the office, Lane makes a lewd sexual remark to the “newly-wealthy" Joan. She was talking about her vacation plans to celebrate her new partnership. He seems grimly happy when she responds with muted anger.

Upon returning home, Lane discovers that Rebecca, unaware of their financial situation, has bought him a new Jaguar as a surprise and paid by cheque. He puts his affairs in order and tries to kill himself by carbon monoxide poisoning but fails when the Jaguar fails to start. He goes back to SCDP and types a resignation letter and hangs himself in his office. Joan arrives Monday morning to assume her usual duties but has trouble opening the door to his office and grows suspicious. She sees knocked-over furniture through the small gap in the door and notices a strong and unpleasant smell and goes into Pete's adjacent office to tell him about it. Pete climbs onto his sofa and looks over the privacy wall and sees what has happened. The partners send everyone home. They claim that they need to evacuate due to a "building emergency". They find a boilerplate resignation letter from Lane. Don shows up with Roger and has the news broken to him by Bert. He is shocked that everyone has left Lane's office as is. Despite the police telling them to stay out of the office so that a report could be made, Don demands that Lane's body be cut down immediately.

In the wake of Lane's suicide, the partners mourn the loss. Joan in particular feels guilty for rejecting his advances and confesses to Don that she wonders whether Lane would have killed himself if she had slept with him. Don keeps the embezzlement a secret. He reveals to no one that he had fired Lane the Friday before the suicide. The business does better than ever. SCDP lands significant client Dow Corning on top of Jaguar and receives a hefty $175,000 insurance payout from Lane's death (approximately $1.5 million in 2021 USD) and posts its first profitable quarter. They begin looking to expand their offices and staff. Suffering guilt and haunted by visions of his brother Adam, who hanged himself in a similar way, Don chooses to refund Lane's $50,000 partnership fee to the widowed Rebecca. This conveniently avoids her inheriting any shares or profits. In response, Rebecca says that Lane was worth much more to the agency than $50,000 and accuses Don and the others of filling "a man like that with ambition" and causing his corruption and eventual suicide.
