= Pete Campbell =

Fictional character from AMC TV series "Mad Men"

- Mad Men character
- Vincent Kartheiser as Pete Campbell
- First appearance: "Smoke Gets in Your Eyes" (1.01)
- Last appearance: "Person to Person" (7.14)
- Created by: Matthew Weiner
- Portrayed by: Vincent Kartheiser

In-universe information
- Full name: Peter Dyckman Campbell
- Nickname: Pete
- Occupation: Account Executive, Partner: Sterling Cooper Draper Pryce; Former: Account Executive; Co-Head of Accounts: Sterling Cooper
- Family: Andrew Campbell (deceased father); Dorothy Dyckman-Campbell (deceased mother)
- Spouse: Trudy Campbell (wife)
- Children: Son (with Peggy Olson); Tammy Campbell (with Trudy)

Peter Dyckman Campbell (born February 28, 1934) is a fictional character on AMC's television series Mad Men. He is portrayed by Vincent Kartheiser.

Kartheiser has won the Screen Actors Guild Award for Outstanding Performance by an Ensemble in a Drama Series twice along with the cast of Mad Men.

== Biography ==
Pete Campbell was born to an upper-crust White Anglo-Saxon Protestant Manhattan family in 1934. His mother, Dorothy "Dot" Campbell (née Dyckman) (Channing Chase), descended from an old Dutch family that had arrived in New Amsterdam and at one point "owned pretty much everything north of 125th Street".

Pete has a strained relationship with his parents, who are emotionally distant and disapprove of their son's decision to go into advertising. In Season 2, after his father dies on American Airlines Flight 1 over Jamaica Bay, Pete is unable to cry.

Upon their father's death, Pete's older brother, Bud (Rich Hutchman), examines their father's finances to determine their inheritance from the family trust. Bud discovers their father, through years of a lavish lifestyle, depleted the money put into the trust. Bud tells Pete this news, and both seem unsurprised. Following this revelation, Pete states that he, in fact, hated his father. Later in Season 2, Pete reveals that he also hates his mother.

Bud also resents their parents, but is treated and regarded by both parents as the favored son. Displaying a mutual resentment of their mother, Bud and Pete reminisce over Alfred Hitchcock's film Rope, loosely based on the story of Leopold and Loeb. When Pete's mother suggests that any possibility of Pete and his wife Trudy's (Alison Brie) adopting a child would be unacceptable and lead to him being disinherited, Pete retaliates by telling her his father squandered the family's life savings. (This fact originally was intended as a secret that Pete and Bud meant to keep from her.) In Season 6, when Pete's mother is forced to live with him in his apartment, he takes pleasure in exploiting her developing Alzheimer's disease to control her.

In Season 1, Pete often expresses a desire to be treated seriously in business. He displays a genuine knack for it, but is unwilling to put in work and seems to be both overly willing to get by on his family name and unwilling to accept that it's his family name, not his own merits, that have gotten him as far as he has come. He can also appear spiteful and cold to people he feels have mistreated him in some way. For example, he attempts to blackmail Don Draper (Jon Hamm) into promoting him by revealing that Don stole another man’s identity; when the blackmail doesn't work, he reveals the secret to Bert Cooper, who defangs the charge by not caring. In later seasons, Pete has changed and saves Don from being exposed as an imposter.

Pete is said to have attended The Buckley School, Deerfield Academy, and Dartmouth College, and it is implied that he was in the Delta Kappa Epsilon fraternity at the latter. He is one of only two main characters who is a non-smoker (apart from marijuana on only one occasion), the other being Bertram Cooper (Robert Morse).

=== At Sterling Cooper ===
Pete is an account executive at Sterling Cooper until December 1963, when he leaves to join Don Draper's new firm. His position at Sterling Cooper entails bringing in new business by finding new clients, arranging client meetings, and wining and dining them (including occasionally arranging meetings for them with prostitutes). He acts as a liaison between them and the creative team, discerning their needs and conveying them to creative, as well as working to make the client accept the campaigns proposed by the creative team. Early in the show, he appears to be unsatisfied with his position and is jockeying for work on the creative end. To this end, he attempts to undermine Draper several times by pitching his own copy to clients, which includes fishing through Draper's trash and sneaking into his office to look at the items on his desk. One of these occurrences nearly gets him fired, but Bert Cooper forestalls that because, regardless of Pete's skills or lack thereof, his family connections are important for bringing in new business for the firm.

At the beginning of Season 3, the new British management promotes Pete to Head of Accounts. He is overjoyed until he discovers that he is actually a "co-head" of the department, sharing the position with Ken Cosgrove (Aaron Staton). Pete becomes enraged and lashes out at Cosgrove, despite the fact that the new management clearly intends to play the two off each other. Pete later distinguishes himself in the position, however, particularly by helping the firm appeal to the previously untapped "Negro market".

Pete later joins the new agency formed by the partnership of Sterling, Cooper, Draper, and Lane Pryce (Jared Harris), with the understanding that he is to become a junior partner, bringing his Sterling Cooper clients with him to their new company.

=== At McCann-Erickson ===
After the absorption of SC&P into McCann, Pete brings over his clients and becomes well liked at the new office. In the penultimate episode, Duck Phillips (Mark Moses) approaches Pete with a lucrative job offer in Wichita with Lear Jet, which Pete flatly refuses at first but later accepts.

=== Marriage and relationships ===
Pete marries Trudy Vogel, a young woman from a nouveau riche family, in March 1960. It is implied that Pete does not know her very well before he marries her; after their honeymoon, he tells his coworkers that she is much funnier than he imagined her to be. The two purchase an apartment on Park Avenue in New York City's Upper East Side. Pete's parents refuse to help the couple pay for the apartment, but Trudy's parents eagerly pitch in, much to Pete's discomfort. Trudy's parents also pressure the couple to try to have a baby, which Pete is reluctant to do.

After 18 months of trying to conceive, the two attend a fertility clinic, where it is discovered that Trudy has fertility problems. Trudy and her parents pressure Pete to look into adoption. Pete is at first uncomfortable with the idea but agrees to think about it, and mentions this to his brother. Bud tells their mother, who disapproves, stating that people of Pete's social status should not be picking from "discards". When Pete finds out that Trudy has put their name on a list to meet with a prominent local adoption agency, he shouts at her, throws the dinner she cooked off their balcony, and forbids her from going through with the adoption. The situation worsens.

This leads to a rift in the marriage, which worsens when Pete is forced to drop an account from Clearasil, which was given to him by Trudy's father Tom (Joe O'Connor), an executive in the company who already disliked Pete. Trudy decides to stay at her parents' house during the Cuban Missile Crisis, and Pete refuses to go with her, stating that if he is going to die, he wants to die in Manhattan.

Pete and his mother are unaware that Pete has already fathered a child with his co-worker, Peggy Olson (Elisabeth Moss), a fact Pete does not learn until the child is more than a year old. Pete initially meets Peggy on her first day as Don's new secretary, in March 1960. A lower middle class Catholic from Brooklyn, Peggy tells Pete that she has just graduated from Miss Deaver's Secretarial School. Pete makes rude comments about her appearance, calling her "Howdy Dowdy", for which Don scolds him. Later that night, however, after his bachelor party, Pete shows up at Peggy's apartment, drunk. Despite his offensive remarks earlier that day, the two sleep together. Months later, Peggy and Pete have sex again on Pete's office couch, early in the morning before the other employees arrive. Though Peggy begins to arrive early for work regularly, the two have no further sexual liaisons. During the Season 1 finale, it is revealed that Peggy – who has put on a considerable amount of weight over the course of the season – is pregnant with Pete's child. She gives birth to a boy.

Early in Season 2, Peter meets Susie (Sarah Wright) after a casting call for Playtex, and they talk in the elevator. Much to Pete's surprise, she lives with her mother, but that doesn't stop them from sleeping together.

During the Season 2 finale, set during the Cuban Missile Crisis, Pete – taking stock of his life now that he fears nuclear war may well be imminent – tells Peggy he thinks she is "perfect", and then confesses that he is in love with her and wishes he had married her. This declaration prompts Peggy to finally admit that she had his baby and gave it up for adoption two years before. After Peggy reveals this, Pete sits in shock. Pete is last seen sitting alone in his dark office, holding a rifle on his lap. It is the same rifle he bought on store credit in Season 1, when he returned a ceramic chip-and-dip he and Trudy received as a wedding gift.

At the start of Season 3, which takes place about six months later, Pete and Trudy seem much closer: he immediately calls her when he gets a promotion, and there is no mention of their child. They seem like a very happy couple dancing the Charleston at Roger Sterling's (John Slattery) garden party, and Harry Crane's (Rich Sommer) wife is jealous of them. When Trudy goes out of town weeks later, though, Pete feels lonely and coerces his neighbor's young German au pair Gudrun (Nina Rausch) into sleeping with him; actor Vincent Kartheiser said that the script said that the "au pair" was supposed to kiss his character back, but the actress portraying her didn't do it, which led some critics to believe Pete raped her. The man she works for comes over to confront Pete in their apartment. When Trudy kisses Pete after returning home, he is noticeably distraught, and he later tells Trudy, "I don't want you to go away anymore without me."

By the end of Season 3, it is apparent that some form of fence-mending has taken place between Pete and Tom, revealed in Season 4 to be Trudy's doing. Pete is able to bring the Clearasil account to the newly formed firm Sterling, Cooper, Draper, and Pryce. In Season 4, the agency drops Clearasil because of a conflict with another account, but Pete is able to manipulate his father-in-law into giving him several larger accounts from that company instead.

In the Season 4 episode "The Rejected," Pete finds out that Trudy is pregnant, much to his delight. Trudy gives birth in the 11th episode of the season to their daughter, Tammy Campbell.

In the early years of their marriage, Pete had trouble reconciling his own ambitions with that of his wife. Pete was a domineering husband, such as when he scolded Trudy for signing up for an adoption agency without his permission. Also, he was angry at her for not sleeping with her ex-beau, who, now a publishing executive, could have gotten a story Pete published in a prestigious publication had she slept with him.

Pete engaged in at least three extramarital affairs in the first years of their marriage. However, Pete seems regretful of his infidelities after he sleeps with a German au pair. After a short period of tension their marriage seemed to improve, something that aligned with a corresponding improvement in Pete's work status. However, in Seasons 4 and 5, Pete seemed to lose his dominance in the relationship, such as when Trudy "forbids" him to give their money to Sterling Cooper Draper Pryce.

By the start of Season 5, Pete and Trudy have moved with their baby daughter to a new home in Cos Cob, a village in the affluent commuter city of Greenwich, Connecticut, which sits on the New Haven Line. Having never learned to drive, Pete commutes by rail to the city. By July 1966, he has enrolled in a driver education course in order to gain a license, where he flirts with a high school student in his class.

Living in Greenwich has a negative effect on the Manhattan-raised Pete, who begins to feel restless in his marriage, home life, and career. He begins an affair with Beth Dawes (Alexis Bledel), the unhappy wife of a fellow commuter, which ends after she has a round of electroshock therapy to cure her undiagnosed depression and, as a result, forgets who he is.

In Season 6, Pete indulges in a fling with a neighbor, whose husband finds out and beats the woman at the Campbells' doorway. As a result, Trudy tells Pete she knows about his infidelities, and she therefore let him have a bachelor pad in Manhattan, so he would have his affairs there, and not in their home turf, but this infidelity with a neighbor is a step too far and she throws him out, although she refuses to divorce, which she deems would acknowledge failure. However, in a later episode, "For Immediate Release", Pete loses his father-in-law's account after they run into each other at a brothel. In revenge, Pete tells Trudy what he saw. She makes it plain she doesn't believe him and wouldn't care if he were telling the truth, after which she throws him out. In the season 6 finale, he comes by to get a few things, as he is driving out west to open up a new branch of the agency in California. He offers a sincere apology to Trudy, who accepts and lets him say goodbye to his daughter.

Beginning in Season 7, Pete debuts his relationship with Bonnie, a real estate agent based in Los Angeles. He brings her to New York on a trip in season 7, but ends up canceling their plans after visiting Trudy and Tammy, and becoming distressed at how distant he has become from them, with Tammy not seeming to recognize or be interested in him. Pete later, hypocritically, accuses Trudy of being a bad parent when she stays out late, after which Trudy coldly retorts: "you're not part of this family anymore." Pete reacts by pushing the bottle of beer he was drinking into a cake Trudy had baked and walks out the house without further comment. In the latter part of the season Pete seeks reconciliation and asks Trudy to relocate with him to Wichita with their daughter. Trudy at first refuses his heartfelt request, admitting she still loves Pete but can't forget his adultery. Eventually, however, she agrees to renew their marriage. The reunited Campbell family is last seen happily boarding a Lear Jet for their new life in Kansas.
