= At the Codfish Ball =

- Mad Men episode
- (from left to right) Émile Calvet (Ronald Guttman), Marie Calvet (Julia Ormond), Megan (Jessica Paré), Don (Jon Hamm), and Sally Draper (Kiernan Shipka) reflect on recent events at the American Cancer Society dinner.
- Episode no.: Season 5 Episode 7
- Directed by: Michael Uppendahl
- Written by: Jonathan Igla
- Original air date: April 29, 2012
- Running time: 48 minutes

Guest appearances
- Ben Feldman as Michael Ginsberg; Charlie Hofheimer as Abe Drexler; John Sloman as Raymond Geiger; Mason Vale Cotton as Bobby Draper; Larisa Oleynik as Cynthia Cosgrove; Ronald Guttman as Émile Calvet; Julia Ormond as Marie Calvet; Talia Balsam as Mona Sterling; Myra Turley as Katherine Olson; Ray Wise as Ed Baxter; Marten Weiner as Glen Bishop; Pamela Dunlap as Pauline Francis; Robin Pearson Rose as Alice Geiger

Episode chronology
← Previous "Far Away Places"	Next → "Lady Lazarus"
- Mad Men season 5

"At the Codfish Ball" is the seventh episode of the fifth season of the American television drama series Mad Men and the 59th episode of the series overall.

The episode is named after the 1936 popular novelty song of the same name by Lew Pollack and Sidney Mitchell. The song recorded by artists of the era including Mae Questel, Bob Crosby, and Tommy Dorsey, as well as decades later by Maria Muldaur. It was featured in a song and dance routine performed by Shirley Temple in the 1936 film Captain January.

The episode was written by Jonathan Igla and directed by Michael Uppendahl. It originally aired on the AMC channel in the United States on April 29, 2012. This episode takes place from late September to early October 1966. In the episode, Megan comes up with a last-minute pitch to save the Heinz account. Peggy thinks Abe is going to propose to her, but he instead suggests they move in together, a decision that does not go over well with her mother. The extended Draper family convenes to attend a banquet in which Don is honored by the American Cancer Society. At the banquet, Sally is exposed to the world of adults. "At the Codfish Ball" was watched by 2.31 million viewers, a decline from the previous episode. It pulled in 700,000 viewers in the 18–49 demographic. Nevertheless, the episode was well received by television critics.

== Plot ==
Sally Draper (Kiernan Shipka) calls Glen Bishop (Marten Weiner) to complain about Pauline Francis (Pamela Dunlap), who is babysitting her and Bobby while the rest of the family is on vacation, calling her step-grandmother "Bluto". Pauline trips on the telephone cord outside the door and hurts her ankle.

Don (Jon Hamm) hauls Megan's parents' luggage into the apartment, as her father Émile (Ronald Guttman) and mother Marie (Julia Ormond) are visiting from Montreal. Later, Sally and Bobby join them for dinner; Sally says that Pauline tripped over Bobby's toy, and Don praises his daughter for how she handled the situation.

Roger (John Slattery) tells his ex-wife Mona (Talia Balsam) about how his recent LSD experience has changed his life. He requests her assistance arranging meetings with prospective clients he will be meeting at an upcoming American Cancer Society dinner to honor Don for his published anti-smoking letter. Mona agrees.

The next day, Megan approaches Don with an idea for the Heinz campaign: a mother serving her child beans in various historical contexts. An excited Don tells Stan Rizzo (Jay R. Ferguson) and Michael Ginsberg (Ben Feldman) about the idea; they complain about the last-minute change but begrudgingly admit that it's better than their ideas. At a dinner with Heinz, Megan learns from the wife of Heinz client Raymond Geiger (John Sloman) that Heinz is planning to fire SCDP. She prompts Don to pitch her idea at the table and take credit. Raymond is impressed and approves of the campaign.

Abe Drexler (Charlie Hofheimer) calls Peggy (Elisabeth Moss) and insists on meeting her for dinner. Peggy tells Joan (Christina Hendricks) she thinks Abe is going to break up with her, but Joan tells her that perhaps he is going to propose to her, and she should prepare to say yes or no. Peggy, in a new dress, arrives for dinner with Abe, who doesn't ask if she will marry him but rather if she would like to move in together. She hesitates but says yes. The next morning, Peggy tells Joan that she and Abe are moving in together, and Joan suggests marriage may be overrated, noting that Greg had decided his commitment to the U.S. Army is more important than his commitment to her.

Ken Cosgrove (Aaron Staton) recounts the Heinz meeting to everyone in the conference room, but Harry Crane takes credit he doesn't deserve, while Pete Campbell notes they still are out of thousands of dollars spent wooing Heinz. Don credits his wife, who calls it beginner's luck, and Peggy congratulates Megan, though Megan appears unenthusiastic. Peggy and Abe invite Peggy's mother Katherine (Myra Turley) to dinner, and Peggy tells her that she and Abe are moving in together. Katherine opposes the idea and says that Abe is just using her as practice before he decides to marry and have a family with another woman. She snidely advises her to just "get a cat" if she's lonely.

Before the ACS dinner, Émile and Marie quarrel, and Megan lets Don know that her father is cheating on her mother. Sally accompanies Megan, Don, Émile, Marie, and Roger to the dinner, where Pete Campbell (Vincent Kartheiser) introduces Don and Megan to Ed Baxter (Ray Wise), Ken’s father-in-law. Ed compliments Don's talent and Megan's contribution to the Heinz campaign. Roger amuses Sally with facts about the guests, and later flirts with Marie at the bar. Meanwhile, Émile tells Megan she has changed, reminding her of her acting dreams and lamenting how her marriage to Don has allowed her to take a shortcut in life instead of working for it. She rebuffs him but is visibly bothered by this truth. Later, Sally enters a room and sees Marie fellating Roger. Ed tells Don the companies at the event love his talent and will shower him with awards but, because of the letter he wrote against Lucky Strike, will never hire him. Don returns to the table and rejoins Megan, Émile, Marie, and Sally, all of whom appear crestfallen.

Back at Don’s apartment while everyone is sleeping, Sally sneaks out in her pajamas and calls Glen. He asks her how the city was and she replies that it was “dirty”.

== Reception ==
=== Ratings ===
"At the Codfish Ball" was viewed by 2.31 million viewers on the night of its original airing. It drew 700,000 viewers in the 18-49 demographic.

=== Critical reception ===
The episode received high praise from television critics. Alan Sepinwall of HitFix called the Draper Heinz pitch "a glorious moment", adding "the best Don Draper pitch in ages. It is also, unfortunately, the last moment in this terrific episode where the rug is pulled out from under someone and they respond remotely that well ... [the episode's] proper conclusion is that beautiful shot of Megan's parents, Megan, Don and Sally sitting around that fancy table, some combination of disappointment, pain, betrayal and disgust washing over all their faces." The Hollywood Reporter's Tim Goodman stated: "There were a series of gears seamlessly interlocking in 'At the Codfish Ball,' an episode of Mad Men that very creatively dissected the way men talk to and interact with women and women talk to and interact with each other. It was a nuanced play on generations that also—separately—was funny, sexy and had a very intriguing idea dropped so casually into the mix [that companies don't want to work with Don] it could easily have gone unnoticed."

Emily VanderWerff of The A.V. Club gave the episode an A− grade, adding "'At the Codfish Ball' is an episode brimming with scenes between parents and children—both real and imagined. If the fifth season of Mad Men has dealt with generational divides in a more abstract sense—the 'youth' movement versus the old guard—then 'At the Codfish Ball' dealt with this on a hyper-personal level." Time magazine writer Nate Rawlings liked the episode's three solid plot lines for Peggy, Megan and Sally. About the latter two, he stated: "For the first 50 minutes of [the] episode, I thought this would be the chapter where Megan really came into her own. She ... out-Draper's [sic] Draper when the chips are on the table. She seems born for the job (and she’s even really sweet when Don's kids show up unexpectedly). But she’s also painfully aware that her parents aren't happy, either with each other or her chosen profession. Yet as bad as things seem for ... Megan, Sally's venture into the adult world could charitably be called a disappointment (traumatic experience is more like it)."

=== Awards ===
"At the Codfish Ball" was nominated for the Primetime Emmy Award for Outstanding Art Direction for a Single-Camera Series.
