= Mad Men season 5 =

Season of television series

Mad Men
- Season 5
- Season 5 promotional poster
- Starring: Jon Hamm; Elisabeth Moss; Vincent Kartheiser; January Jones; Christina Hendricks; Jared Harris; Aaron Staton; Rich Sommer; Kiernan Shipka; Jessica Paré; Christopher Stanley; Jay R. Ferguson; Robert Morse; John Slattery
- No. of episodes: 13

Release
- Original network: AMC
- Original release: March 25 – June 10, 2012

Season chronology
- ← Previous; Season 4 Next → Season 6

The fifth season of the American television drama series Mad Men premiered on March 25, 2012, with a two-episode premiere, and concluded on June 10, 2012. It consisted of thirteen episodes, each running approximately 48 minutes in length. AMC broadcast the fifth season on Sundays at 10:00 pm in the United States. The fifth season was released on DVD and Blu-ray in region 1 on October 16, 2012.

Season 5 takes place between Memorial Day (May 30) 1966 and spring 1967. The season explores Don Draper's new marriage to Megan, which leads him to ignore his work at the Sterling Cooper Draper Pryce advertising agency. Meanwhile, Lane, Pete, Roger, Joan, and Peggy learn that it is "every man for himself" in their personal and professional lives, as they each face painful new beginnings. As with previous seasons, the fifth season of Mad Men was lauded by critics and was the second most acclaimed series of 2012 based on year-end lists published by prominent television critics.

== Cast ==
=== Main cast ===
- Jon Hamm as Don Draper
- Elisabeth Moss as Peggy Olson
- Vincent Kartheiser as Pete Campbell
- January Jones as Betty Francis
- Christina Hendricks as Joan Harris
- Jared Harris as Lane Pryce
- Aaron Staton as Ken Cosgrove
- Rich Sommer as Harry Crane
- Kiernan Shipka as Sally Draper
- Jessica Paré as Megan Draper
- Christopher Stanley as Henry Francis
- Jay R. Ferguson as Stan Rizzo
- Robert Morse as Bert Cooper
- John Slattery as Roger Sterling

=== Recurring cast ===
- Ben Feldman as Michael Ginsberg
- Teyonah Parris as Dawn Chambers
- Mason Vale Cotton as Bobby Draper
- Embeth Davidtz as Rebecca Pryce
- Jeff Clarke as Howard Dawes
- Beth Hall as Caroline
- Meghan Bradley as Julia
- Alison Brie as Trudy Campbell
- Christine Estabrook as Gail Holloway
- Peyton List as Jane Sterling
- Sadie Alexandru as Scarlett
- Alexis Bledel as Beth Dawes
- Stephanie Drake as Meredith
- Pamela Dunlap as Pauline Francis
- Charlie Hofheimer as Abe Drexler
- Larisa Oleynik as Cynthia Cosgrove
- Julia Ormond as Marie Calvet
- Kevin Rahm as Ted Chaough
- Marten Holden Weiner as Glen Bishop
- Ray Wise as Ed Baxter
- Robin Pearson Rose as Alice Geiger

=== Guest stars ===
- Talia Balsam as Mona Sterling
- Michael Gladis as Paul Kinsey
- Ronald Guttman as Emile Calvet
- Zosia Mamet as Joyce Ramsay
- Joel Murray as Freddy Rumsen
- Samuel Page as Greg Harris
- Jay Paulson as Adam Whitman
- Myra Turley as Katherine Olson

== Plot ==
Don Draper has married his secretary Megan Calvet, who throws a surprise birthday party for Don and their co-workers. Megan has been promoted to copywriter, but struggles with Don's growing detachment with work, as well as her own unfulfilled dream of being an actress. Don's detachment also alienates Peggy, who is being made to train Megan, and Bert, who feels that Don has gone "on love leave" and does not care about his job or turning in quality work. Feeling insecure about her career ambitions, Megan ultimately quits her job at SCDP to pursue acting.

Don's slacking at work coincides with the arrival of a new hire, in the form of young advertising phenom Michael Ginsberg, who proves to be a rival for Don and Peggy, the latter of which is frustrated over Ginsberg being able to rise faster within the company. When the creative team are made to pitch advertisements for a snow cone company, Don purposely leaves behind Ginsberg's material in order to pitch his own campaign, which is ultimately chosen. Meanwhile, Roger struggles to remain relevant in the company as Pete schemes to steal his plush office for himself, and he begins to secretly pay Peggy and Ginsberg to produce material for him to pitch to clients. Roger also experiments with LSD, which has a profound impact on him and his own marriage to Jane; under the influence of the drug, the two confess that their marriage has failed. After Roger and Jane get a divorce, Roger begins an affair with Megan's mother Marie.

Joan struggles with single motherhood while Greg is overseas. When Joan discovers that Greg has signed up for another tour of duty in the Army Medical Corps without consulting her, she kicks him out of the house. Greg later files for divorce, and Joan fears that he will paint her as the villain in their divorce case. Further complications arise for Joan in the firm's pursuit of Jaguar as a client, when Pete discovers that the agency will get the account if Joan sleeps with the head of the Jaguar dealers' association. Pete arranges a vote behind Don's back, and Lane convinces Joan to take an ownership percentage of the company in exchange for sleeping with the client. The firm ultimately wins the account, but alienates Joan and Don from the rest of the partners and from each other.

Pete, having moved to the suburbs, begins to become more detached from his life and starts missing the big city. His relationship with Lane collapses and the two fight, with Lane beating Pete up in front of the other partners. Pete also begins a relationship with Beth, the wife of a fellow train commuter, who breaks off their brief affair out of guilt. Beth later tells Pete that her husband is forcing her to undergo electroshock therapy for her manic depression. Pete visits Beth in the hospital, but she does not remember him; Pete then confronts Beth's husband on the train, culminating in a fist fight. Returning home defeated and alone, Trudy agrees to allow Pete to rent an apartment in the city for overnight stays. Peggy, meanwhile, feels unappreciated for her work and decides to leave the agency for another firm in order to fulfill her full potential. Don attempts to keep her by offering her a raise, but ultimately concedes that Peggy has to leave him to continue out of his shadow.

Lane Pryce struggles with his own demons as he is revealed to be greatly in debt and owing a good amount of taxes from when he moved his money to the United States to help keep the firm afloat. When his scheme to use his Christmas bonus to pay off his tax debt fails, Lane is forced to steal from the company to pay his debt. Don ultimately discovers the embezzlement and fires Lane. Unwilling to face the disgrace of resigning and returning to England, Lane hangs himself in his office and is found by the SCDP staff. Don takes Lane's death especially hard and begins to experience hallucinations of his brother Adam, who also died by suicide via hanging.

In the season finale, Megan seeks Don's help to secure a commercial role for her. Marie denounces Megan's acting ambitions and tells Don that he should not help Megan, as she believes that Megan should instead behave like the proper wife of a wealthy man. Nevertheless, Don agrees to help Megan get the role in order to secure her the happiness she needs to function. Megan eventually gets the role, and after dropping her off at the studio for filming, Don leaves for a bar, where he sits by himself and orders a drink. The season ends with a montage of all the main characters having realizations about themselves. Pete, in the aftermath of his affair with Beth, is seen sitting alone on his couch with his headphones on and eyes closed. Peggy, having quickly risen through the ranks in her new career, is shown toasting a single glass of champagne to herself with a smile on her face. A naked Roger looks out the window of his hotel room at the city, in the throes of an LSD trip. At the bar, a woman begins to flirt with Don and asks if he is alone. He turns and looks at her ambiguously.

== Episodes ==
No. overall	No. in season	Title	Directed by	Written by	Original release date	US viewers (millions)
53	1	"A Little Kiss"	Jennifer Getzinger	Matthew Weiner	March 25, 2012	3.54
54	2	"A Little Kiss"	Jennifer Getzinger	Matthew Weiner	March 25, 2012	3.54
On Memorial Day weekend in 1966, several Y&R employees drop water on African-American protestors picketing in support of equal-opportunity employment; Roger suggests running a mock ad touting SCDP as an equal-opportunity employer. Joan, on maternity leave after giving birth to her son Kevin, sees the ad and tearfully asks Lane if they are planning to replace her. Don's children spend the holiday with him and Megan, who has been promoted to copywriter. Pete struggles with Roger's constant attempts to undermine him in front of clients, and he tricks Roger by setting up a phony meeting with non-existent Coca-Cola executives. Lane finds a man's wallet in a cab and uncovers a photo of a young woman named Delores. He later calls the wallet's owner and briefly flirts with Delores, the owner's girlfriend who answers the call. Megan throws a surprise birthday party for Don with all of SCDP in attendance, but is put off by Don's childhood-based ambivalence about birthdays, causing a rift between the still-newlyweds. After Megan goes home from work early, Don arrives to see her cleaning the remaining party mess in nothing but skimpy lingerie—and puts an end to their rift by compelling her to aggressive sex.
55	3	"Tea Leaves"	Jon Hamm	Erin Levy and Matthew Weiner	April 1, 2012	2.94
Betty confronts her recent weight gain by attempting to get a prescription for diet pills, but the doctor instead discovers a possibly cancerous nodule on her thyroid. Faced with her own mortality, Betty confronts the legacy of her life; the nodule is later revealed to be benign. Don meets with Heinz executives, who suggest trying to get the band to record a jingle for their ad campaign. Harry and Don go backstage at a Rolling Stones concert, but fail miserably at their attempt to meet with the band. Pete signs Mohawk Airlines as a client and gives the account to Roger, who asks Peggy to hire a new copywriter for Mohawk. While searching for potential copywriters, Peggy is impressed by the work of Michael Ginsberg, but is put off by his edgy and neurotic behavior. During his interview with Don, however, Ginsberg is upstanding and professional, puzzling Peggy. After being hired by Don, Ginsberg returns home and becomes shy and reserved upon encountering his father Morris. Pete makes a puffed-up speech to the SCDP employees regarding his success in landing the Mohawk account; Roger angrily walks out, loathing his apparent descent in value to the agency.
56	4	"Mystery Date"	Matt Shakman	Victor Levin and Matthew Weiner	April 8, 2012	2.75
Greg returns from Vietnam, only to reveal that he is being sent back for another year of service. When Joan finds out that Greg volunteered to go back, she kicks him out, ending their marriage. Peggy discovers that Don's African-American secretary Dawn is sleeping in the office, too afraid to return home because of racial violence near Harlem. Dawn is invited to spend the night at Peggy's apartment, but she decides to leave when Peggy appears to hesitate leaving her purse next to Dawn. Sally becomes frightened after reading stories on the Richard Speck murders, leading her step-grandmother to educate her on the concepts of fear and defense. Megan and a feverish Don run into his former lover, Andrea; Megan is upset over constantly running into Don's old flames. Don returns home and collapses on his bed in a weakened state. Andrea arrives and seduces Don, proclaiming that he will continue meeting her because he cannot change who he is, causing Don to fly into a rage and choke her to death. Don awakens the next morning, having experienced a fever dream; he says nothing of his vision to Megan and reassures she does not need to worry about him.
57	5	"Signal 30"	John Slattery	Frank Pierson and Matthew Weiner	April 15, 2012	2.69
Pete flirts with a high school student in his driver's education class, but she calls him old and rejects him. Pete and Trudy host a dinner party for the Cosgroves and the Drapers; Pete feels jealous of Ken's writing success, as well as Don's handyman skills at fixing their leaky faucet. After watching England win the 1966 FIFA World Cup Final, Lane attempts to land an account with Jaguar Cars. Edwin, the Jaguar representative, persuades Don, Roger, and Pete to visit a local brothel, during which Edwin, Roger, and Pete cheat on their wives. The next day, Edwin withdraws from SCDP after his wife finds out about his infidelity, causing Lane to blame Pete's methods for losing the account. In response, Pete questions Lane's role at the firm, leading to a fist fight between the two men; Lane wins, leaving a bloodied and humiliated Pete on the office floor. Joan comforts Lane, who misinterprets her affection and kisses her. Roger bluntly tells Ken to stop writing, as he should not be diverting any attention from his job. Ken suspects Pete informed Roger and continues to write under a new pen name. In the elevator, Pete talks about his despair at the day's events to Don. Close to tears, he confesses that he has nothing, while Don remains silent.
58	6	"Far Away Places"	Scott Hornbacher	Semi Chellas and Matthew Weiner	April 22, 2012	2.66
Following an argument with Abe, Peggy pitches to the Heinz executives without Don and Megan, who are on an impromptu trip to Plattsburgh. After unsuccessfully selling her pitch, a frustrated Peggy has a sexual encounter in the theater with a young man. Ginsberg tells Peggy that he was born in a Nazi concentration camp and was adopted from an orphanage. Affected by the story, Peggy calls Abe to reconcile. Roger and Jane take LSD with a group of intellectuals, allowing them to speak candidly about their marriage for the first time; the two ultimately decide to separate. While visiting Howard Johnson's flagship Plattsburgh restaurant, Don and Megan fight when she expresses her frustration at having her needs and desires take a back seat to Don's. Megan makes a hurtful remark about Don's mother, causing Don to drive off without her; he later returns, only to discover that she is gone. After waiting for hours at the restaurant, Don drives home and finds Megan in their apartment; he violently struggles with her before tearfully admitting that he thought he had lost her. Returning to SCDP, Don is lectured by Bert for being on "love leave" after Peggy's failure with Heinz.
59	7	"At the Codfish Ball"	Michael Uppendahl	Jonathan Igla	April 29, 2012	2.31
When Henry's mother breaks her ankle at the Francis house, Sally and Bobby stay in Manhattan with Don, who is being honored at a banquet for the American Cancer Society. Megan's parents, Émile and Marie, visit from Montreal to attend the banquet, and Megan reveals her parents' divorce intentions to Don. Abe and Peggy decide to move in together; Peggy reveals the news to her mother, who disapproves and states that Abe is "using" Peggy as practice. Megan approaches Don with an idea for the Heinz campaign. During a dinner with Heinz executive Raymond, Megan learns that Heinz is planning on firing the agency and secretly tells Don, prompting him to pitch Megan's concept to the table. Raymond is impressed and approves the pitch. At the banquet, Don discovers that his professional reputation has been damaged because of the letter he wrote against Lucky Strike, while Sally inadvertently walks in on Marie giving Roger fellatio. Émile tells Megan that she has changed, reminding her of her acting dreams and insinuating that her marriage to Don has allowed her to take a shortcut in her life instead of working for it. Megan rebuffs him, but is visibly bothered by this truth.
60	8	"Lady Lazarus"	Phil Abraham	Matthew Weiner	May 6, 2012	2.29
Don returns to creative work full throttle, only to find the cultural changes of the 1960s have left him behind. Striving to fill the emptiness of his life, Pete bonds with Beth, the wife of his commuter friend Howard. The two have a sexual encounter, but Beth tells him to forget it ever happened. Pete becomes obsessed with wanting to repeat the experience and orchestrates a second meeting with Beth, but she does not arrive. Megan has second thoughts about her career path and confides in Peggy, who scolds her for taking a high-value job that others would "kill to have". Megan tells Don of her desire to start acting again, and with Don's apparent blessing, she quits her job at the agency. Later, during a taste testing for Cool Whip, Don scolds Peggy and accuses her of "driving" Megan out of the office; Peggy retorts that she is not the one who Don is mad at. Don complains to Megan about being unfamiliar with youth and popular culture, leading her to bring him a copy of the Beatles album Revolver. Don starts to listen to "Tomorrow Never Knows", but quickly picks up the needle and turns the record off.
61	9	"Dark Shadows"	Scott Hornbacher	Erin Levy	May 13, 2012	2.13
While helping Sally on a family tree project, Betty becomes jealous upon finding a love note Don has written to Megan and passive-aggressively tells Sally about Anna. Don is furious at Betty for telling Sally, but Megan tells him to let it go, pointing out that Betty just wants to ruin their marriage from afar. Sally overhears their conversation, and to get back at her mother, acts as if the revelation meant nothing. Pete continues to resent that his brief affair has ended with Beth. Roger agrees to buy Jane a new apartment, free of old memories, in exchange for her help wooing Manischewitz executives. Jane and Roger have sex in her new apartment; the next morning, Jane sadly tells Roger he has ruined the apartment for her. While working on the Sno Ball account, Don covertly looks through Ginsberg's private work and realizes that Ginsberg's ideas are better than his own. The creative team agrees to pitch both Don and Ginsberg's ideas to the Sno Ball executives, but Don purposely leaves Ginsberg's ideas behind in the taxi cab before the meeting. The presentation is successful, but Ginsberg is enraged by the act of sabotage and confronts Don.
62	10	"Christmas Waltz"	Michael Uppendahl	Victor Levin and Matthew Weiner	May 20, 2012	1.92
Around Christmas, Lane is instructed by his London attorney to wire $8,000 to England within two days for back taxes, or else he risks being arrested. Lane convinces the firm's bank manager to authorize a $50,000 credit extension, and announces to the partners that they can hand out Christmas bonuses. Lane later forges Don's signature on a $7,500 check. Harry meets with Paul Kinsey, who has joined the Hare Krishnas and has written a terrible spec script for the series Star Trek. Harry is seduced by Paul’s Hare Krishna paramour, who reveals that Paul is the movement's best recruiter; Harry later pays Paul a trip to Los Angeles so he can leave the movement and try to break into scriptwriting. After Joan is served divorce papers in the office, she and Don go to a bar for a drink and have an intimate chat, during which Joan reveals that her mother raised her to be admired. When Mohawk Airlines suspends their advertising budget due to a machinist strike, the SCDP partners agree to give bonuses only to the staff. Pete reveals that Jaguar is again looking for an advertising firm, and that presentations will start in mid-January.
63	11	"The Other Woman"	Phil Abraham	Semi Chellas and Matthew Weiner	May 27, 2012	2.07
Ken and Pete meet with Herb Rennet, a member of Jaguar's selection committee, who suggests that SCDP will get the account if they arrange for him to sleep with Joan. Don and Joan angrily reject the idea, but the remaining partners reluctantly approve it, agreeing to offer Joan $50,000 by withholding Christmas bonuses and extending their credit line. Needing to cover his embezzlement, Lane convinces Joan to demand a 5% partnership stake in the company in exchange for sleeping with Herb. Don visits Joan's apartment to dissuade her; however, it is revealed that Joan's sexual encounter with Herb had already taken place, and SCDP ultimately wins the Jaguar account. Don becomes furious after learning Megan could take a role in Boston. When her callback is unsuccessful, Don assures Megan he doesn't want her to fail in her acting ambitions. Feeling unappreciated for her work, Peggy confides in Freddy Rumsen, who encourages her to move companies. Peggy later meets with Ted Chaough from CGC, and is offered chief copywriter position at a $19,000 salary, which she accepts. Peggy informs the news to Don, who kisses her hand as a gesture of appreciation, realizing how important she was to him.
64	12	"Commissions and Fees"	Christopher Manley	Andre Jacquemetton & Maria Jacquemetton	June 3, 2012	2.41
Bert examines SCDP's financial records and approaches Don about Lane's forged check. When Lane confesses to stealing money from the company, Don fires him. Sally refuses to join Betty for a family ski vacation and decides to stay with Don and Megan. While having a rendezvous with Glen, Sally experiences her first period and returns to the Francis house to seek comfort from Betty. After Don expresses a yearning for more, Roger gets him a meeting with Ed Baxter at Dow Chemical. Ken requests to manage Dow Chemical, but asks that Pete be left off the account, due to Pete telling Roger about Ken's writing. Lane falls into a depression and attempts to commit suicide in his Jaguar through carbon monoxide poisoning. When the car fails to start, Lane returns to the office and hangs himself. The following day, Joan is unable to enter Lane's office. Disturbed by a foul odor, Joan notifies Pete, Harry and Ken, who quickly discover Lane's corpse through the office window. While waiting for the police to arrive, Don, Roger and Pete force their way into Lane's office and cut him down to preserve his dignity; they also discover Lane's resignation letter in the process.
65	13	"The Phantom"	Matthew Weiner	Jonathan Igla and Matthew Weiner	June 10, 2012	2.70
After a profitable quarter, the firm seeks to expand to a new office space. Following Lane's suicide, Don is haunted by memories of Adam and experiences a vision of his brother while visiting the dentist for a tooth abscess. Don gives the $50,000 check to Rebecca, who lambasts him and accuses the agency of short-changing Lane. Megan struggles to find acting work, and her ambitions are cruelly denounced by Marie. Roger asks Marie to join him on an LSD trip, but she refuses. Peggy is adjusting to her new agency and makes amends with Don after running into him at the movies. Beth meets with Pete and reveals that Howard is forcing her into shock treatment for her depression. Pete later visits Beth at the hospital, but she does not recognize him; Pete then fights with Howard on the train, causing him to get kicked off. Concerned for Pete's welfare, Trudy suggests buying an apartment in the city. Megan asks for Don's help in getting an audition for a commercial at the agency and lands the role. While Megan films her commercial, Don sits at a bar and is approached by a flirting woman; he looks at her ambiguously.

== Production ==
=== Crew ===
Series creator Matthew Weiner also served as showrunner and executive producer, and is credited as a writer on 10 of the 13 episodes of the season, often co-writing the episodes with another writer. Erin Levy was promoted to co-producer and wrote two episodes. Victor Levin joined as co-executive producer and wrote two episodes. Frank Pierson joined as consulting producer and wrote one episode. Semi Chellas was promoted to co-producer and wrote two episodes. Jonathan Igla wrote two episodes. Writing team Andre Jacquemetton and Maria Jacquemetton were promoted to executive producers and co-wrote one episode together. Other producers included Blake McCormick and executive producer Scott Hornbacher.

Jennifer Getzinger, Scott Hornbacher, Michael Uppendahl, and Phil Abraham each directed two episodes for the season. The remaining episodes were directed by Matt Shakman, cast member John Slattery, Matthew Weiner, who directs each season finale; with cast member Jon Hamm and cinematographer Christopher Manley each making their directorial debuts.

== Reception ==
The fifth season of Mad Men has received critical acclaim. Review aggregator Rotten Tomatoes reports that 97% of 38 critics have given the season a positive review with an average score of 9.3/10. The site's consensus is: "With its brilliantly crafted characters, razor-sharp writing, and ambitious sweep, Mad Men continues to surprise and unsettle." On Metacritic, the fifth season has scored an 89 out of 100 based on 24 reviews, indicating universal acclaim.

=== Accolades ===
The fifth season received three nominations from the Television Critics Association Awards for Program of the Year and Outstanding Achievement in Drama, while Jon Hamm was nominated for Individual Achievement in Drama.

==== 64th Primetime Emmy Awards ====
Season five received 17 nominations for the 64th Primetime Emmy Awards, although it did not win any.

- Outstanding Drama Series
- Outstanding Lead Actor in a Drama Series: Jon Hamm
- Outstanding Lead Actress in a Drama Series: Elisabeth Moss
- Outstanding Supporting Actor in a Drama Series: Jared Harris
- Outstanding Supporting Actress in a Drama Series: Christina Hendricks
- Outstanding Guest Actor in a Drama Series: Ben Feldman
- Outstanding Guest Actress in a Drama Series: Julia Ormond
- Outstanding Directing for a Drama Series: Phil Abraham for "The Other Woman"
- Outstanding Writing for a Drama Series:
  - Semi Chellas and Matthew Weiner for "Far Away Places"
  - Semi Chellas and Matthew Weiner for "The Other Woman"
  - Andre Jacquemetton and Maria Jacquemetton for "Commissions and Fees"
- Outstanding Art Direction for a Single-Camera Series
- Outstanding Casting for a Drama Series
- Outstanding Cinematography for a One Hour Series
- Outstanding Hairstyling for a Single-Camera Series
- Outstanding Makeup for a Single-Camera Series (Non-Prosthetic)
- Outstanding Single-Camera Picture Editing for a Drama Series
