= Mystery Date (Mad Men) =

- Mad Men episode
- Episode no.: Season 5 Episode 4
- Directed by: Matt Shakman
- Written by: Victor Levin; Matthew Weiner
- Original air date: April 8, 2012
- Running time: 48 minutes

Guest appearances
- Sam Page as Greg Harris; Ben Feldman as Michael Ginsberg; Mädchen Amick as Andrea Rhodes; Christine Estabrook as Gail Holloway; Alyson Reed as Ruth Harris; Lou Richards as Charles Butler Jr.; Teyonah Parris as Dawn Chambers; Zosia Mamet as Joyce Ramsay; Pamela Dunlap as Pauline Francis

Episode chronology
← Previous "Tea Leaves"	Next → "Signal 30"
- Mad Men season 5

"Mystery Date" is the fourth episode of the fifth season of the American television drama series Mad Men and the 56th episode of the series overall. It was written by the series' creator and executive producer Matthew Weiner and the writer Victor Levin and was directed by Matt Shakman. It originally aired on the AMC channel in the United States on April 8, 2012.

The episode takes place in July 1966, featuring much discussion among the characters about the Richard Speck murders in Chicago. Don runs into an ex-lover and cannot seem to escape her presence. Joan's husband, Greg returns from his tour of duty in Vietnam only to reveal that he is being sent back for another year of service; later over dinner it comes out that he actually volunteered to go back for another year. Sally becomes frightened after reading stories on the Speck murders, leading her step-grandmother to educate her on the concepts of fear and defense. Dawn spends the night at Peggy's apartment after becoming too afraid to return home because of racial violence near Harlem.

The episode's title is derived from the 1965 Milton Bradley board game for teenage girls, Mystery Date, wherein several female players draw cards to advance to opening a door, hoping to find one of a variety of desirable male dates on the other side, while simultaneously hoping to avoid the lone undesirable one. A vintage television commercial for the game is viewed by Don's daughter Sally during the episode.

The storylines involving Joan, Sally, and Peggy were well received, although some felt the dream sequence was a heavy-handed way to have Don deal with his past infidelities. "Mystery Date" had consistent viewership with the previous week, with 2.8 million overall viewers and 1.0 million viewers in the 18-49 demographic. Critics noted the dark atmosphere of the episode, with Weiner comparing it to a horror movie. The episode carried themes of sexual violence and the concept of masculinity.

== Plot ==
Joyce Ramsay walks into Sterling Cooper Draper Pryce with graphic photos of the recently committed murders of eight nurses in Chicago by Richard Speck. There were nine possible victims, with the one survivor hiding under the bed until Speck left. Ginsberg reacts in disgust to the other employees' fascination with the murder photos.

Don Draper, on the elevator to SCDP's offices with Megan, is coughing profusely, sweaty, and feverish. A flirty former lover, Andrea Rhodes, walks into the elevator and starts to hone in on Don before Don introduces Megan as his wife. Don tries to assuage a slightly perturbed Megan, who is upset over how many of Don's old flames they run into in Manhattan. Don works with new hire Michael Ginsberg and Ken Cosgrove on the pitch to Butler Footwear. Ginsberg goes rogue during the presentation and ends up pitching a commercial based on Cinderella, which the group had earlier rejected as being too cliche - although that was what the executives were expecting, and they reject the pitch they had earlier approved in favor of a Cinderella campaign. Don is enraged and admonishes Ginsberg for the act; Ginsberg is unaware of the seriousness of his transgression until Ken points out he was on the verge of being fired. Afterwards, Don returns home early to an empty house and collapses on his bed in a weakened state.

Don awakens to a knock on the door; he finds Andrea, still in her tight yellow dress. Don directs her to leave immediately and forces her to go out through the apartment's service elevator. After Don returns to bed, Andrea walks into his bedroom again, having entered through the unlocked back door. She seduces Don and the two end up having sex in his bed. In a post-coital moment, Andrea declares to Don that he will continue meeting her for trysts because he cannot change who he is. Don flies into a rage and chokes her to death. Panicking, he kicks her under the bed, but one of her red shoes remains visible, recalling both the visual of Ginsberg's Cinderella pitch and the lone survivor from the Speck murders. Don awakens the next morning to realize he was having a fever dream. He says nothing of his vision to Megan and tells her she does not need to worry about him.

Sally's overbearing step-grandmother Pauline is babysitting Sally while Betty and Henry are out of town. Sally overhears Pauline having a telephone conversation about Speck's spree. After stealing a newspaper out of the garbage and reading about the murder, Sally becomes frightened and unable to sleep. Pauline comforts Sally by suggesting the nurses asked for their fate for presumed lasciviousness. Pauline takes out a butcher knife, intending to use it for protection, and splits a Seconal with Sally. Betty and Henry return home the next day to find Pauline asleep on a couch with the butcher knife on a table by her side. Sally is asleep underneath the couch, once again recalling the visual of the Speck survivor.

Roger asks Peggy to devise a new Mohawk Airlines campaign over the weekend, in an attempt to cover for the fact that he had neglected to put the creative team on that task a week earlier. Peggy, realizing that for once she has the upper hand, agrees to the favor only after Roger hands over all the cash in his wallet ($410, equivalent to $4,068 in 2025), rejecting the ten dollars which Roger initially offered her (explaining that "the work is ten dollars; the lie is extra."). While working late, Peggy discovers Dawn sleeping in Don's office. Peggy offers Dawn a spot on her couch at home, as Dawn worries about returning to her own home in Harlem due to racial tension in the area. Peggy and Dawn drink beers at Peggy's apartment, while Peggy reveals insecurity over whether she "acts like a man" or not. While leaving her apartment's living room, Peggy has an awkward moment with Dawn when Peggy realizes that her purse (with Roger's cash still inside) is alone on the table next to Dawn. Peggy cleans up and leaves the purse next to Dawn. Peggy wakes up the next morning to find a note from Dawn apologizing for inconveniencing her.

Joan's husband Greg returns home from the Vietnam War after a year of service, greeting their new baby boy, and spending an afternoon with Joan in bed. Afterwards, Greg breaks bad news to Joan—he is being shipped back out again for another year. Joan complains about the government's lies, but Greg backs up his duty to the country. During a dinner at a fancy restaurant with Joan's mother and Greg's parents, Greg is forced by his mother to reveal that he in fact volunteered to go back, sending Joan into a rage. She is absolutely horrified that Greg would abandon his duties as a father to head back to war, where he "feels like a good man". The next morning, Joan sits him down and tells him to leave. Through her teeth, she proclaims that he was "never a good man", subtly referring to the time he raped her back in the second season. Greg storms out, and Joan informs her mother that "it's over". Joan spends the night lying awake next to her sleeping mother and child.

== Production ==
"Mystery Date" was written by creator Matthew Weiner and co-executive producer Victor Levin. The episode was directed by Matt Shakman. Director Matt Shakman had never worked on an episode of Mad Men before this episode. This was also the first episode of the series that co-writer Victor Levin had penned. Levin had actually worked in advertising before becoming a television writer. He was the Associate Creative Director at both the Young and Rubicam advertising agency as well as BBDO. Both agencies had been either mentioned or depicted on Mad Men in the past. Levin also won two Clio awards for his work in advertising, which was an award Don won in the previous season in the episode "Waldorf Stories".

"The theme of sexual violence, of what it means to be a man, is a big part of that episode," creator Matthew Weiner said of "Mystery Date". "There's this idea of this carnal, dangerous impulsive male. Of the dream sequence, Hamm said, "Unlike a lot of things on our show, it's very visceral and immediate and scary and weird" with Hamm noting that Weiner compared the episode to a horror film. The scene in which Peggy blackmails Roger was one of Elisabeth Moss's favorite moments, with Moss saying that she was "playing Roger Sterling" in that scene.

Weiner was fascinated by the presences of the Richard Speck murders in the media, despite the 40 race riots occurring in America around the same time. "Part of that force is the sex drive. No one wants to be a victim of that, but when you look at Pauline's interest in the murders, it's sexual. It's such a deep touchstone of creepiness," he noted.

The footage of Don returning to bed after kicking Andrea out of the apartment was actually reverse footage of Don getting out of bed only minutes before, which led some to believe that this was a directorial touch by Shakman to help the viewer discern the dream sequence by including unreal footage.

== Reception ==
=== Ratings ===
"Mystery Date" received steady viewership that was consistent with the ratings for the previous week. It received 2.8 million viewers, down only from 2.9 from "Tea Leaves". The episode also received a 1.0 rating in the important 18-49 demographic, the same rating as the week before.

=== Critical reception ===
While the portions of the episode focusing on Joan, Peggy, and Sally were critically acclaimed, some critics were mixed on the value of the dream sequence. One writer for Zap2it declared the episode one of the best episodes yet. Alan Sepinwall, writing for Hitfix said that the episode was "full of nightmares and self-realizations" as well as "horrifying images". Sepinwall wrote that the "only way the strangulation scene would have been acceptable to me was with the understanding going in that it was a dream. Had the show not telegraphed that — or had I not figured it out — and Don woke up the next morning with no corpse on the floor, I'd have been irked." One writer for Paste Magazine noted that the "brilliantly shot" episode had a "Hitchcockian feel", and pointed to the use of "reverse point-of-view shots" and "close-ups of hands on doorknobs that added an air of suspense not usually present on Mad Men." Eric Goldman of IGN declared it the "best episode yet for Season 5, with some very good material for Joan, Peggy, Don and Sally packed into a busy hour." Goldman praised the resolution to the Harris marriage, crediting Weiner with mastering "the slow burn on this show, and it was just so gratifying to finally have this issue be dealt with."

Maureen Ryan of The Huffington Post called the episode "deeply unsettling" on purpose. She said that "Violence against women was inescapable in this episode, but what made Mad Men's exploration of the topic worthwhile and compelling was that two women in this episode asserted their power and control over their lives. It wasn't a story about helplessness and victimization; it was an episode about everything from sweaty discomfort to outright terror, and how we deal with those emotions." John Swansburg, writing for Slate, said the episode was a "dud," with the fever dream a "very obvious (and not particularly enlightening) way to depict Don wrestling with his infidelity issues." Jordan Bartel of the Baltimore Sun compared "Mystery Date" to a Stephen King novel. Meredith Blake of the Los Angeles Times admitted that the dream sequence was "heavy-handed" but that "there’s also something terribly convincing about the link 'Mystery Date' posits between Don’s seemingly insatiable sexual appetite and his personal demons. If only these things dissipated as easily as a fever." Rolling Stone writer Sarene Leeds praised Christina Hendricks' performance and the dream sequence, asking "even though it wasn't "real," what makes Don Draper any different from Richard Speck, the student-nurse murderer?"
