= Christmas Waltz =

Christmas Waltz may refer to:

- "Christmas Waltz" (Mad Men), 2012 television episode
- "The Christmas Waltz" by Sammy Cahn and Jule Styne (1954), also recorded as "Christmas Waltz"
