= Joan Harris =

Fictional character on American TV series "Mad Men"

- Mad Men character
- Christina Hendricks as Joan Harris
- First appearance: "Smoke Gets in Your Eyes" (1.01)
- Last appearance: "Person to Person" (7.14)
- Created by: Matthew Weiner
- Portrayed by: Christina Hendricks

In-universe information
- Full name: Joan P. Harris
- Alias: Joan Holloway (maiden name)
- Nickname: Red
- Occupation: Founder and Director of Holloway-Harris (season 7); Junior Partner and Director of Agency Operations at SCDP and SC&P (seasons 4–7); Office Manager, SCDP (season 4); Office Manager, Sterling Cooper (seasons 1–3); Sales Associate at Bonwit Teller (season 3); Housewife season 3
- Family: Gail Holloway (mother)
- Spouses: Scotty (last name unknown; ex-husband); Greg Harris (ex-husband)
- Children: Kevin Harris (with Roger Sterling)

Joan P. Holloway Harris is a fictional character on the AMC television series Mad Men (2007–2015). She is portrayed by Christina Hendricks.

Hendricks has received six consecutive Primetime Emmy Award nominations for Outstanding Supporting Actress in a Drama Series and has won two Critics' Choice Television Award for Best Supporting Actress in a Drama Series for her performance. She has also won the Screen Actors Guild Award for Outstanding Performance by an Ensemble in a Drama Series twice along with the cast of Mad Men.

== Fictional character biography ==
=== Early life and education ===
Joan Holloway (born February 24, 1931) was raised in Spokane, Washington, by Gail Holloway, a single mother. She attended college in Boston.

=== Sterling Cooper ===
From season 1 through season 3, Joan is the office manager at the advertising agency Sterling Cooper. Her primary responsibilities are to manage the secretarial, steno, and telephone operators pools; attend to the needs of the executives; and organize agency events. She is also seen during meetings with the heads of departments, implementing Robert's Rules of Order, taking notes, and reminding the male staff of their duties to their clients, and assisting creative director Don Draper (Jon Hamm) and CFO Lane Pryce (Jared Harris) with Sterling Cooper financial duties.

Joan is also the original supervisor of Peggy Olson (Elisabeth Moss), who starts at Sterling Cooper as a secretary and eventually becomes a copywriter. Joan and Peggy do not get along at first; Joan is contemptuous of Peggy's demure attitude and conservative dress, while Peggy is intimidated by Joan's beauty and assertiveness. Over the course of the series, however, the two become good friends, and support each other through their personal and professional struggles, with Joan being supportive of Peggy's evolution as a copywriter in the male-dominated culture of advertising.

Joan is a hyper-feminine and charming woman, with a pragmatic view of sex and attraction. Though skilled in her career, her ultimate goal is to find a promising and devoted man to marry, and then become the strength and motivation supporting him behind the scenes as he achieves success. To this end, Joan has carefully prepared and practiced, learning the social and housewife skills necessary to be a helpful, upper-class partner, while maintaining a beautiful appearance through self care. She has many playful affairs with powerful men who adore her, but whom she discounts as marriage material. They have already achieved their success, and with most of them being married, do not fit her romantic ideal of devoted husband. Joan has little desire to be a trophy second wife.

Joan had a lengthy romantic involvement with Roger Sterling (John Slattery), which started when she was his secretary, cooled when she rose to office manager, and ended after Roger's heart attack. After Marilyn Monroe's death, Roger walks into his office to find Joan lying on his couch and crying. Realizing she is upset over the similarities she sees between the actress's life and her own, Roger comforts Joan by assuring her she will not end up alone and in despair like Monroe.

Sometime before the start of the series, Joan was briefly married to a man named Scotty. Though Scotty is never seen, she mentioned to a friend in the season 6 episode "To Have and To Hold" that her marriage to him was the "worst six months of my life."

Joan had also had an intimate relationship with copywriter Paul Kinsey (Michael Gladis) sometime before the series began. Joan ended the relationship because Paul had "a big mouth," implying that he bragged about the relationship to others. Her roommate, Carol (Kate Norby), who Joan knows from college, expresses romantic interest in Joan in the episode "The Long Weekend," although Joan gently rebuffs her advances.

In season 2, Joan becomes engaged to Greg Harris (Samuel Page), a resident physician at St. Luke's Hospital. Joan is in a difficult place when it comes to marrying Greg, as she struggles to balance both her sassy, independent personality and the traditional vulnerability of a woman being dependent on her husband. As the season goes on, Joan is clearly torn between wanting to be a well-off, married woman (the pinnacle of her ambition) and the fear that she will become a bored, lonely housewife. Joan chose Greg over the stereotypical rich men she has affairs with because he is handsome and a promising young doctor just about to launch his career as a surgeon. Greg needs her support, and seems like a good bet that he'll become a successful, romantic, and devoted husband. He turns out to be a poor choice, when his delicate ego, anger issues, and sense of entitlement clash with his utter lack of professional skill, preventing him from being either a successful husband, or a successful doctor.

Her mixed feelings about her future are exacerbated when she is briefly given additional responsibilities at Sterling Cooper reading television scripts to determine ad placement, which thrills her. However, Media Director Harry Crane (Rich Sommer) ultimately hires a young, unqualified man to take over the ad placement job, to her disappointment.

In "The Mountain King," Greg meets Joan at Sterling Cooper to take her on a dinner date. Joan introduces him to Roger for the first time, and Greg picks up on the fact that Roger knows Joan's likes and dislikes. Joan attempts to dismiss his suspicions by claiming that Roger only knows her well because of how long she has been with the agency. As she's locking up for the day, Greg follows Joan into Don's office, closes the door behind him, and tries to convince her to be intimate with him. When she playfully declines, he forces her to the floor and rapes her.

When season 3 premieres, Joan and Greg have recently married, and she's preparing to leave her job to become a housewife just as soon as Greg is promoted to chief resident. In "My Old Kentucky Home," they host a dinner party with Greg's colleagues where Joan learns that not only has he not made chief resident, but that his skill — and thus his future — as a surgeon is in question. Nonetheless, she leaves her job at Sterling Cooper as planned. Not long after, accounts executive Pete Campbell (Vincent Kartheiser) runs into Joan at Bonwit Teller, where he's surprised to find her working as a shop assistant. Clearly embarrassed, Joan lies and says that Greg is considering going into psychiatry, so she needed to work a little longer while he continued his training.

Joan helps Greg prepare for a job interview, but he fails to get the job. The two have a heated argument, ending with Joan smashing a vase over Greg's head after he says she'll never understand wanting and planning for something she always expected to get, and then realizing she'll never get it. Joan later places a call to Roger Sterling's office after hours, asking him to help her find another office manager job. Greg ultimately obtains an officer's commission in the Army where he will serve as a military surgeon, and tells Joan she will no longer have to work. Despite this, Joan comes to the aid of Don, Roger, Lane, and Bert Cooper (Robert Morse) to launch the new Sterling Cooper Draper Pryce by finding accounting materials and client records. When the new company sets up shop at The Pierre hotel, Joan takes the position of office manager.

=== Sterling Cooper Draper Pryce (SCDP) ===
Joan is considered by most of the staff to be integral to SCDP's daily operations. Her new office, which serves chiefly as a thoroughfare rather than a private workspace, contains an intercom linked to the conference room. While the intercom allows her to listen in on meetings, this capability is known only to her and Peggy.

She encounters sexual harassment, misogyny and sexist jokes from freelancing artist Joey Baird, who shows her little to no respect, telling others she has no talent and sleeps her way to the top. However, she refuses to reprimand or terminate him, as she feels it will make her appear to be difficult to work with and weak to her male colleagues. Peggy eventually fires Joey, but Joan doesn't thank her and tells her she did it for her own satisfaction.

In season 4, Joan and Greg are shown trying to conceive a child, but their marriage is strained by Greg going to basic training and later being sent to Vietnam. While he's gone, Joan and Roger have a friendly dinner, but are robbed at gunpoint on the walk home and have a brief one-night stand that leads to Joan getting pregnant. She plans to get an abortion, and Roger insists on paying for it. She travels to a clinic for the procedure, as she waits to be called in, she's mistaken for a mother of a teen daughter getting an abortion. Joan continues with the pregnancy and lets Greg believe the child is his.

At the end of season 4, Joan is promoted to director of agency operations, in recognition of her role in keeping SCDP afloat amid its recent financial troubles. However, it is in title only, without a raise in pay.

At the start of season 5, Joan has recently given birth to a boy named Kevin and is nearing the end of her maternity leave from SCDP. Her mother, Gail (Christine Estabrook), is staying with her to help with the baby while Greg is away in Vietnam.

In "Mystery Date," Greg returns home on furlough from Vietnam, but informs Joan he is being ordered to go back for an additional year. However, at a dinner with Greg's parents, Joan learns he reenlisted voluntarily since the army makes him feel powerful and it is likely the only place where his abysmal surgical skills would be accepted. Joan becomes enraged and throws him out. Joan tells him he has never been a good man, alluding to his rape. He threatens to divorce her if he leaves, but Joan simply tells him to leave.

In "Christmas Waltz," a process server shows up at the SCDP office to serve Joan with divorce papers, which upsets her. Joan yells at SCDP's receptionist, Meredith (Stephanie Drake), and storms off. Don offers to take her out for the day and the two test drive a Jaguar. They spend the remainder of the afternoon drinking in a midtown bar, and she confesses to Don that she is unsure of how to start over with a baby. While Don and Joan are flirty with each other, the relationship between the two remains platonic.

In "The Other Woman," Joan is taken aback when Pete approaches her with a proposition to sleep with Herb Rennet (Gary Basaraba) in order to secure the Jaguar account for SCDP. She asks if all the partners are on board with this request, and Pete lies and says yes, even though Don objected, and that they are offering her $50,000. Lane, concerned that his embezzlement might be discovered if they try to pay Joan the cash, recommends privately that she demand a voting partnership and 5% of SCDP instead. Joan agrees to the request on the condition she be made partner, as Lane suggested. It's not until after her rendezvous with Herb that she learns Don was actually the one dissenting partner.

As partner, Joan's overall role in day-to-day operations doesn't change much beyond the fact that she now votes in partners' meetings. Her relationships with the other partners vary. She is closest compatriots with Lane, since they frequently work together on the practical running of the business, and commiserate on keeping the flighty creatives in check and under budget. However, Lane expresses inappropriate and unappreciated sexual interest in Joan, and she resents that he feels entitled to her in that way, while she skillfully shuts him down. She gets along well with Don Draper on a friendly level since they are fellow spirits when it comes to their pragmatic views of relationships, and he was the only one who opposed the Jaguar deal, but she is wary of his changeable-creative-side impact on the business on a professional level. Cooper respects her as a business woman and a woman, which she appreciates, though they are not particularly close. Her relationship with Roger is fond, but distant given their past, and she views Peter Campbell as a greasy worm. She and Harry Crane (who is not a partner) are open enemies and despise each other.

In "Commissions and Fees," Joan discovers Lane's body after he dies by suicide in his office. She later expresses bewilderment to Don, wondering if she had slept with Lane, maybe he would not have died. Don assures her that she is worth more than her body, which she is grateful for. In the season 5 finale, Joan appears to have taken over Lane's accounting duties and presides over the acquisition of new office space for the firm.

=== Sterling Cooper & Partners (SC&P) ===
At the start of season 6, Joan has settled into her new role as partner at SCDP. In "To Have and To Hold," Joan discovers that Harry Crane's secretary, Scarlet (Sadie Alexandru), has been having Dawn (Teyonah Parris), Don's secretary, punch out her time cards. Joan confronts them and fires Scarlet, angering Harry. He yells at the other partners for letting Joan do whatever she wants, clearly resenting being passed over for partner. He implies that Joan made partner only because she prostituted herself, much to Joan's humiliation.

In the same episode, Joan is visited by a childhood friend, Kate (Marley Shelton), who now works for Mary Kay Cosmetics. Kate expresses her admiration for Joan, believing that Joan's partnership has more power than it actually has. This causes Joan to realize that she must stop acting like a secretary. She transfers many of her office manager duties to Dawn in order to concentrate on her new role.

In "For Immediate Release," Joan is outraged when Don fires Jaguar after a tense meeting with Rennett. She publicly lambasts Don for negating the sacrifice she made to ensure the account and their personal relationship permanently suffers. In "Man with a Plan," Joan presides over the complicated physical logistics of SCDP's merger with CGC. CGC's secretaries express irritation at being placed under Joan's command, but she brushes them off to warmly welcome back Peggy, who had briefly left to work for CGC. Bob Benson (James Wolk), an eager new hire in accounts, walks in on Joan, who is in extreme pain. He discreetly escorts her to the hospital and is also able to expedite her care. Joan is suspicious of Bob's motives for helping her, but her mother advises her that not every good deed is a front. In return, Joan quietly steps in to save Bob's job when he is about to be laid off.

By "The Better Half," Joan and Bob have become close friends, and are preparing to go to the beach together with Kevin. Roger appears unannounced and is suspicious of Bob's presence. Roger attempts to be a part of Joan and Kevin's lives, but she tells him that she intends to let Kevin grow up thinking that Greg is his father.

In "A Tale of Two Cities," Joan goes on a blind date with an Avon executive, which is arranged by Kate. However, it turns out to be a business meeting, as Avon is looking for a new direction. Joan is eager to expand her role in the firm and recruits Peggy to assist her in securing the account. However, she nearly blows it by excluding Pete from the proceedings and coming on aggressively at the meeting. Peggy is able to narrowly salvage the situation and the two women again reach an understanding.

Later on, Joan easily sees the attraction between Peggy and CGC executive Ted Chaough (Kevin Rahm), but doesn't mention it to Don until they go over budget for a commercial. Joan is shocked when Don smooths the client's feathers by saying the expensive idea was that of the deceased Gleason. This averts the client's anger but embarrasses Ted and takes credit away from Peggy in the process. Don's punishing choice in dealing with the situation, in addition to his earlier impetuousness in firing Jaguar, makes her wary of Don. When Thanksgiving 1968 approaches, Joan agrees with Cooper, Sterling, and senior partner Jim Cutler (Harry Hamlin) that Don should be placed on leave, as she is concerned with Don's erratic behavior and its overall effect on the firm. Joan reveals that she has made arrangements for Creative to continue functioning, with Ted overseeing Peggy long-distance. Joan invites Roger to spend Thanksgiving with her. When Roger responds negatively to the presence of Bob, whom Joan had also invited, she warns him that she is allowing him into Kevin's life, but not hers.

In season 7, Joan completely cedes her office manager role to Dawn and takes a more active role as junior partner and account executive — handling Avon and Butler Footwear. She proves to be capable, as well as a quick study. Her personality has hardened considerably, and she seems more money-conscious, which is likely motivated by her status as single mother. Initially, she bears a clear animus towards Don for having fired Jaguar, as it cost her a substantial amount of money when the public offering fell through. She casts a vote to fire Don for "costing me money" when he violates the terms of his return, though she later favors the sale to McCann-Erickson because it stands to provide her with more than $1 million. Joan also rejects a marriage proposal from Bob, who is gay, on the grounds that both of them deserve real love and not an "arrangement" that is meant only to cope with Joan's financial difficulties and Bob's need to be in the closet.

During the second half of season 7, Joan has gained confidence in her new position. During a business trip to SCDP's West Coast office, she meets Richard (Bruce Greenwood), a wealthy and very charming real estate developer whom she begins dating (though he initially expresses regret over the fact that Joan has a small child). However, as her personal life begins to come together for the first time since her divorce from Greg, she suffers professionally when SCDP is absorbed into McCann. She takes issue with the lewd and sexist treatment that she receives from her male colleagues at the new agency and complains to Jim Hobart (H. Richard Greene), the director at McCann. Hobart responds first with condescension and then with contempt. When Joan threatens to take legal action and to reveal McCann's misogynistic culture to the New York Times, Hobart offers to buy Joan's remaining contract out for half of what it's worth. Joan vows to stay at McCann and fight, but when she seeks out Roger Sterling for support, Roger instead tells her that it would be more pragmatic to take the money and walk away. Betrayed, Joan takes the payout and leaves.

In the series finale, "Person to Person," Joan starts her own film production company. She attempts to recruit Peggy as a partner, but Peggy chooses to stay at McCann. Joan and Richard continue dating and become somewhat serious about one another, but he is opposed to her re-entering the business world. When Joan announces she is starting her own company, he ends their relationship. She is last seen watching her mother and Kevin go off to the park and then resuming her work at the new venture, which is operating out of her apartment under the name Holloway-Harris.

== Personality ==
Embodying the role of femme fatale, Holloway is a bold and sassy character. When creating the character, Mad Men's creator Matthew Weiner tried to make her appear not as a television stereotype, but as an unpredictable and complicated woman. The Boston Globe has said that Holloway occupies "a sort of middle ground between the show's main female characters, who represent opposing paths for women of their day"; as Betty Draper (January Jones) gave up a modeling career to become a housewife and Peggy Olson (Elisabeth Moss) tries to become a copywriter in "a world where men routinely call women 'girls', and sometimes literally chase them through the office".

Holloway is pragmatic about the sexual realities of her work environment and her appearance, and chooses to be aware and smart about it, rather than dismissive or naïve. This is reflective in her advice to new secretaries about birth control and discretion. Yet, she is still a romantic, who likes men as a whole and hopes to earn her fairy tale dream. She hardens considerably over the series as she is repeatedly, and casually, betrayed by the various men in her personal and professional life in both small and large ways. The stricken, optimistic dreamer is forced to be self reliant, and to expand her own power beyond her sexual influence into the realms of position and money as a result of these betrayals.

Holloway is considered the queen bee of the office secretarial pool, with a sharp sense of office politics and protocol. While her conduct is generally professional, she is also apt to punish her subordinates in order to make her point. She believes discretion is the most important quality in a secretary and will never hesitate to remind other secretaries to safeguard their bosses' private affairs at all times. She also enforces proper deference among the secretaries for their superiors, such as sharply correcting Lois, who refers to Peggy by her given name, as "Miss Olson." Despite being tolerant of flirtation, throughout all stages of her career, Holloway always insists on good work coming first, and has little tolerance for the inept: "You can be a pretty face hunting for a husband, so long as you do good work in the interim." As shown in the third season finale, her role at Sterling Cooper (and later Sterling Cooper Draper Pryce) is made clear. The office is essentially unable to operate without her, as no one else knows how the office is organized, Joan also detests the idea of people coming to her defense, such as Peggy firing Joey for the sexist drawing of her.

Joan was born on February 24, 1931. She is a green-eyed redhead, stands 5 feet 8 inches tall, and her New York State drivers license (as of Season 2) indicates she weighs 140 pounds. She lives at 42 West 12th Street, apartment 4C. Many commentators seized upon Joan's friendship with the apparently gay Bob Benson and pointed out that the Stonewall Inn is not far from Joan's residence.

In an interview with USA Today, addressing the character's perception as a sex symbol, Christina Hendricks explained that people think her character is "hot" because "She's got fire to her. She snaps back. And men love her because she's in touch with her sexuality and femininity. The men in the office can play with her a little bit. They can tease her, and she's not going to be in the bathroom crying later." In the season two episode "Maidenform", each secretary is categorized as either a Marilyn Monroe or a Jackie Kennedy as a campaign for Playtex; when asked what kind of woman Holloway is, copywriter Paul Kinsey (Michael Gladis) answers: "Well, Marilyn's really a Joan, not the other way around".

== Creation and development ==
Weiner originally envisioned Joan as a "smaller," "mousier," and more "sharp-tongued" character, but he changed his mind when Hendricks was cast. Initially, Joan was set to be a guest role only. However, the role was extended to regular status because of Hendricks' "on-screen magnetism".
