= Commissions and Fees =

- Mad Men episode
- Episode no.: Season 5 Episode 12
- Directed by: Christopher Manley
- Written by: Andre Jacquemetton; Maria Jacquemetton
- Original air date: June 3, 2012
- Running time: 48 minutes

Guest appearances
- Embeth Davidtz as Rebecca Pryce; Marten Holden Weiner as Glen Bishop; Ray Wise as Ed Baxter

Episode chronology
← Previous "The Other Woman"	Next → "The Phantom"
- Mad Men season 5

"Commissions and Fees" is the twelfth and penultimate episode of the fifth season of the American television drama series Mad Men and the 64th episode of the series overall. It is co-written by Andre Jacquemetton and Maria Jacquemetton, and directed by Christopher Manley. It aired on the AMC channel in the United States on June 3, 2012.

The episode takes place in February 1967. Don (Jon Hamm) discovers that Lane (Jared Harris) stole money from the company and fires him. Sally's (Kiernan Shipka) childhood comes to an end while she has a rendezvous with former neighbor Glen Bishop (Marten Weiner). After Don expresses a yearning for more, Roger (John Slattery) gets him a meeting with Dow Chemical, a client that could shape the future of the company. When he returns home, Lane falls into a melancholic depression and later commits suicide.

The episode received critical acclaim, with particular attention given to the conclusion of Lane's story. The audience for "Commissions and Fees" rose from the previous episode and was watched by 2.41 million viewers. It was also watched by 0.8 million viewers in the age 18–49 demographic, another gain.

== Plot ==
Lane has breakfast with a member of the American Association of Advertising Agencies, who praises his fiscal track record and asks him to serve as head of the association's fiscal control committee. He accepts. Examining the company financial records, Bert Cooper (Robert Morse) finds Lane's forged check and accuses Don of giving an unauthorized Christmas bonus. Don privately calls Lane into his office to show him the check and demands his resignation. Lane argues that he was only taking his own money that he previously invested and for which he had not been compensated, lambasting Don as being out of touch with how people who aren't rich have to live. Don gives him the weekend to think of an "elegant exit." Lane wanders over to Joan's (Christina Hendricks) office, but she sends him away after he makes an insinuating comment.

At a partners meeting, Pete (Vincent Kartheiser) says Jaguar would like to pay SCDP via a fee structure instead of straight commission. He adds that Jaguar's tire supplier Dunlop is interested in meeting with SCDP. Tired of meager accounts, Don tells Roger to arrange a meeting with Ed Baxter at Dow Chemical Company. Roger reminds him that Ken Cosgrove (Aaron Staton) is hesitant about doing business with his father-in-law, but Don does not care. Over drinks, Roger tells Ken they are going after Dow Chemical but assures him he is not obligated to work on the account. Ken agrees to keep the proceedings secret from his wife if Roger agrees to say he forced Ken onto the account and to exclude Pete from all meetings. Roger tells Don he arranged a meeting with Baxter on Monday.

As Betty Francis (January Jones) packs for a family ski vacation, Sally complains that she would rather spend the weekend with Don and Megan (Jessica Paré). An angry Betty calls Don to say she is dropping Sally off at his apartment. To Megan's surprise, Sally shows up at the apartment and informs her that she will be staying for the weekend. Megan later complains to Don for not telling her about Sally's visit. Don confides that he had to fire Lane for embezzlement. Lane arrives home drunk to find that Rebecca has surprised him with a new Jaguar. He vomits but reassures Rebecca (Embeth Davidtz) the next morning that he likes the car. He then attempts to commit suicide in the middle of the night using the new car's exhaust, but the car fails to start. He walks into SCDP's empty office and types a letter at his desk.

Sally invites Glen to visit while Don and Megan are at work the next day. They visit the American Museum of Natural History and he admits that he told his friends he was going to "do it" with Sally, but that he thinks of her as a little sister. Feeling ill, Sally runs to the bathroom and finds blood on her underwear. She takes a cab to the Francis house and tells Betty, hugging her tightly. Betty gives Sally a hot water bottle and assures her that starting her cycle means "everything is working."

Don puts aside Baxter's concerns about the advertised anti-smoking letter and insists Dow Chemical needs a new agency, despite having 50% of the market share. Don chides Baxter and his staff for allowing Dow to be satisfied with a 50% market share when they should go after more.

Lane's secretary drops off some company records with Joan, saying Lane has not arrived and his office door is locked. Joan tries to open Lane's door to find it blocked and seeks out Pete, Ken, and Harry in the neighboring office. Pete looks into Lane's office through the partition window and discovers Lane hanged himself. Cooper, Pete, and Joan break the news to Roger and Don. Don, Pete, and Roger force their way into Lane's office and cut down Lane's body, place him on the couch to preserve his dignity. Roger opens Lane's note titled "To my fellow partners," but finds Lane's boilerplate resignation.

At home, Don offers to drive Glen, who returned to the apartment to retrieve his duffel bag, back to his dormitory at Hotchkiss in Connecticut. Glen states that "everything you think is going to make you happy just turns to crap." Don asks what Glen would do if he could do anything, and assists Glen in driving his car to Hotchkiss.

== Production ==
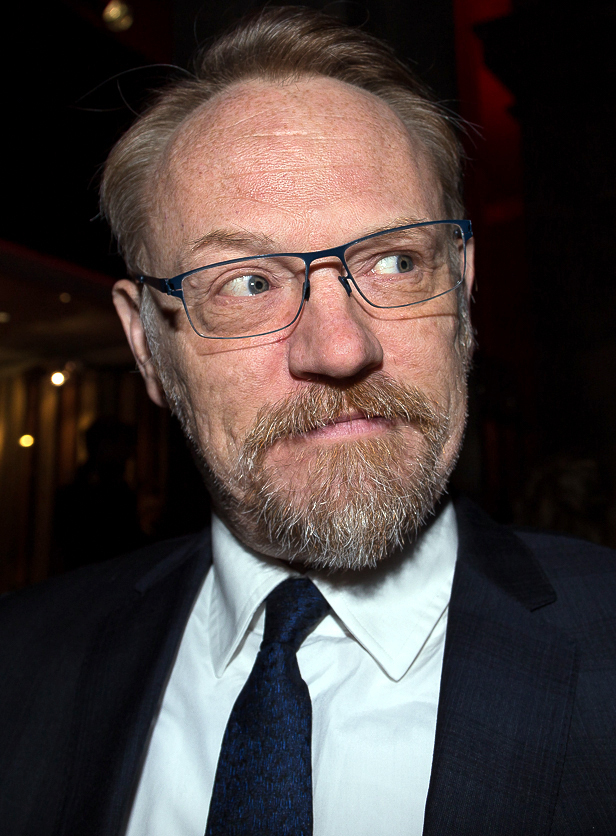
Jared Harris's character Lane Pryce is killed off in the episode.

Jared Harris was told after the tenth episode read-through by series creator Matthew Weiner that Lane Pryce's time was at an end. About Lane's forced retirement, Harris stated: "In the beginning, he doesn't know that's the reason he's being called into the office. Once it comes up, he thinks he can bluff his way out of it. And then he goes through all of these emotions, from anger to denial to depression to acceptance. It was all written in there. The [script] was very specific about the different turns he would take." Harris continued about his character's subsequent suicide: "When Matt told me [the Jaguar] idea, I laughed my ass off. When he said the car doesn't start, I just laughed for about five minutes. Nothing goes right for [Lane]...The sadness that I feel is that it's been such an amazing experience." Pete's (Vincent Kartheiser), Don's (Jon Hamm), and Roger's (John Slattery) "shocked and chaotic" reactions to Lane's corpse were the actors' genuine reactions, according to Harris.

Weiner called the decision to write off Lane Pryce "a terrible thing to have to deal with." He added, "You want to make sure that it's worth it, that they're going out with a bang and you're not sacrificing someone who's a great actor and a great musician in the orchestra. But also I feel like there have to be stakes. This year was filled with foreboding of violence and death, and the connection of that early summer between the riots, which resulted in death, police killing innocent people, and the Richard Speck murders and the guy on the Texas tower [Charles Whitman]. The randomness and the nihilism that was born from that was something that permeated the story. Lane's story I thought was about someone who has undervalued themselves and that was his only way out, he thought."

== Reception ==
=== Critical reception ===
The episode received critical acclaim. Alan Sepinwall of HitFix wrote about the "palpable, painful sense of dread throughout this episode", stating: "Though Lane's tax trouble seemed to come out of nowhere a few weeks ago...all of his behavior, and Don's, felt very true to form, and not like characters acting in a way designed to create a specific end point. Lane was doomed, but by his own actions and foibles as much as by any plot engineering to get that noose around his neck." The Guardian's Paul McInnes felt the series was "recovering its poise" on its way to the season finale, stating: "After dallying with melodrama (Pete and Beth Dawes, Harry and Hari Kinsey), the show has moved back towards the darker, more sophisticated narratives of cause and unexpected consequence. This week Lane may have taken his own life, but Don also got his mojo back and the two were directly related." Verne Gay of Newsday compared the characters of Lane Pryce and Don Draper, stating: "Both have secret lives protected by carefully constructed façades. For both, the façade is everything — and Lane's would simply fall away, like a line of dominoes when confronted with the consequences of his lie. A lie, after all, made in the service of his son."

=== Ratings ===
"Commissions and Fees" was watched by 2.41 million viewers and received an adult 18–49 rating of 0.8.

=== Accolades ===
This episode received a nomination for Outstanding Writing for a Drama Series for the 64th Primetime Emmy Awards.

Due to his nomination, Jared Harris submitted this episode for consideration for Primetime Emmy Award for Outstanding Supporting Actor in a Drama Series for the 64th Primetime Emmy Awards.
