= Dark Shadows (Mad Men) =

- Mad Men episode
- Episode no.: Season 5 Episode 9
- Directed by: Scott Hornbacher
- Written by: Erin Levy
- Original air date: May 13, 2012
- Running time: 48 minutes

Guest appearances
- Peyton List as Jane Sterling; Alexis Bledel as Beth Dawes; Richard Fancy as Max Rosenberg; Kate McNeil as Edith Huff; Mason Vale Cotton as Bobby Draper; Ben Feldman as Michael Ginsberg; Jeff Clarke as Howard Dawes; Mark Famiglietti as Bernie Rosenberg; Eileen Barnett as Amelia Rosenberg; Meghan Bradley as Julia; Gabrielle Wagner as Judy Steckler

Episode chronology
← Previous "Lady Lazarus"	Next → "Christmas Waltz"
- Mad Men season 5

"Dark Shadows" is the ninth episode of the fifth season of the American television drama series Mad Men and the 61st episode of the series overall. It was written by Erin Levy and directed by Scott Hornbacher and originally aired on the AMC channel in the United States on May 13, 2012.

In the episode, set in the weeks approaching Thanksgiving 1966, Betty's bitterness over her weight gain and Megan's youth, beauty, lifestyle, and adoration from Don lead Betty to tell Sally about Anna Draper, to cause turmoil amongst Sally, Don and Megan. Don and Peggy are irritated by Michael Ginsberg's rising star and Don takes a devious approach to clip the wings of the cheeky young copywriter. Roger gets handed a new client (Manischewitz) by Bert Cooper but Roger's decision that he needs more Jewish input to help him prompts him to involve his estranged wife Jane Siegel, with unfortunate results. Pete continues to resent the ending of his brief affair with Beth, the wife of his commuter-acquaintance Howard.

"Dark Shadows" received a polarized reception from television journalists, with some criticizing its treatment of symbols and themes as being too heavy-handed. The episode's themes were pinpointed by many critics as insecurity and jealousy. "Dark Shadows" was viewed by 2.125 million viewers on the night of its original airing and drew 0.7 million viewers in the 18-49 demographic.

The episode is titled after the gothic soap opera Dark Shadows, and features a scene of Megan helping her best friend Julia (Meghan Bradley) prepare to audition for a role on the show. The episode aired the same weekend that a film adaptation of the same name opened.

== Plot ==
Betty is making steady progress in her new Weight Watchers program as Thanksgiving approaches. When she visits the Draper home, she accidentally and covertly sees the youthful Megan getting dressed. Later, while helping Sally on a family tree project, Betty finds a love note Don had written to Megan. The note reawakens feelings of bitterness and discontent, and Betty passive-aggressively tells Sally to include Don's first wife (Anna Draper) on the family tree. Sally is taken aback, as she was unaware of her father's secret wife. When Sally questions Betty about Anna, Betty snippily tells her to ask Megan.

While staying with Megan and Don, Sally scolds Megan for lying to her. Later that night, Megan tells Don about Sally's knowledge of the late Anna Draper. Don becomes furious at Betty, but Megan tells him to let it go—Betty wants to ruin the marriage and Sally's relationships with Don and Megan from afar. Sally overhears this conversation, and to get back at her mother, she acts as if the revelation meant nothing.

Don becomes competitive with Ginsberg on the Sno Ball account after covertly looking through Ginsberg's private work, which shows many ideas that Don realizes are better than his own. The creatives agree to pitch both Don's and Ginsberg's ideas to the Sno Ball executives. When it comes time to pitch the two ideas at the Sno Ball office, Don commits an act of sabotage by leaving Ginsberg's idea in the taxi cab. After Don's idea wins the account, Ginsberg confronts Don in the elevator and tells Don that he feels sorry for him. Don replies that he doesn't think about Ginsberg. Don leaves the elevator and a frown emerges over his face.

Bert enlists Roger to dine with the Manischewitz executives and tells him to bring his wife, Jane Siegel. When Roger protests that Jane is now his ex-wife, Bert feigns surprise. Roger agrees to Jane's request that he buy her a new apartment, free of old memories, in exchange for her help wooing the client. The client dinner goes well, and the client's son (who is the decision maker in the client's firm) is smitten with Jane. Afterwards, Jane and Roger have sex in Jane's new apartment. Jane wakes up the next day, despondent over what she perceives as Roger's "poisoning" of the new apartment by creating new memories there associated with their love.

Megan and Don prepare their Thanksgiving meal, as a toxic cloud of smog hangs over New York City. At the Francis household dinner, Betty gives thanks for having "everything I want".

== Reception ==
=== Ratings ===
"Dark Shadows" was viewed by 2.125 million viewers on the night of its original airing. It drew 0.7 million viewers in the 18-49 demographic.

=== Critical reception ===
The episode received polarized reactions from television journalists and bloggers, ranging from positive to negative. Emily VanDerWerff of The A.V. Club gave it a "B" rating, calling it the fifth season's most "scattered" episode. VanDerWerff argued that "the [camera] cut from the hovering smog to the Francis Thanksgiving is not exactly subtle, and I tire of when the show presents Betty as this bruised monster who's not in control of her own impulses [...] the show has always been at its best when it can harness some degree of sympathy for the woman."

IGN writer Eric Goldman gave the episode an 8 out of 10, and pinpointed the episode's theme as "insecurity". Paste Magazine writer Bonnie Stiernberg criticized the episode, saying: "It's not that 'Dark Shadows' wasn't a good episode—it was. But this week's theme felt a little heavy-handed; nearly every character's storyline was dominated by it in an obvious manner."

Maureen Ryan of the Huffington Post called "Dark Shadows" the worst episode of the season, saying: "It was a bad episode of TV. And it was not in a special class of mediocrity that allows it to still somehow remain elevated above the fray. It made the mistakes that much less brilliant shows make. It repeated a lot of themes that we're already very familiar with, it didn't add to them in compelling or imaginative ways, and it featured a character [Betty] that just doesn't work."

Tim Goodman of The Hollywood Reporter was more forgiving towards the episode, noting: "I'm sure that some of the elements in 'Dark Shadows' will be table-setters for future storylines. It was an episode that seemed to gather itself, make a point while setting up plotlines, then end on time. That's all. There's no harm in that; such episodes come along at least twice in the season run of very good shows. But there was a heavy-handedness to the thematic illustration of self-interest in the episode – like the writers backed up a truck full of references to selfish behavior and dumped them into the room for ease of use. Mad Men can do better than this, of course. It has, and it will again. Just put the anvil down. We get it."

=== Accolades ===
Ben Feldman who plays Michael Ginsberg received a nomination for the Primetime Emmy Award for Outstanding Guest Actor in a Drama Series for the 64th Primetime Emmy Awards.
