= The Phantom (Mad Men) =

- Mad Men episode
- Episode no.: Season 5 Episode 13
- Directed by: Matthew Weiner
- Written by: Jonathan Igla; Matthew Weiner
- Original air date: June 10, 2012
- Running time: 48 minutes

Guest appearances
- Julia Ormond as Marie Calvet; Embeth Davidtz as Rebecca Pryce; Jeff Clarke as Howard Dawes; Alexis Bledel as Beth Dawes; Jay Paulson as Adam Whitman; Kevin Rahm as Ted Chaough; Emily Foxler as Emily; Alison Brie as Trudy Campbell

Episode chronology
← Previous "Commissions and Fees"	Next → "The Doorway"
- Mad Men season 5

"The Phantom" is the thirteenth episode and season finale of the fifth season of the American television drama series Mad Men and the 65th episode of the series overall. It is co-written by Jonathan Igla and Matthew Weiner and directed by Weiner. It originally aired on the AMC channel in the United States on June 10, 2012.

In the episode, which primarily takes place around Easter 1967, the firm looks to expand its office space after a profitable quarter. Roger seeks to resume his affair with Megan's mother, while Pete has a final encounter with Beth. Megan struggles to find acting work and asks for Don's help, and Peggy is adjusting to life away from Sterling Cooper Draper Pryce.

== Plot ==
Don (Jon Hamm) soothes an aching tooth with a cotton ball soaked with whiskey at home. Megan (Jessica Paré) offers to schedule him a dental appointment, but he declines. At work, he continually sees visions of his dead brother Adam (Jay Paulson).

Howard (Jeff Clarke) and Beth Dawes (Alexis Bledel) join Pete (Vincent Kartheiser) on the train, but Beth avoids Pete. She later calls him at his office, asking him to meet her at the Hotel Pennsylvania. At the hotel, she reveals she is starting electroshock therapy the next day. She has been depressed and it is the only thing that will help, but it might erase her memory of him. In bed, he urges her to forgo treatment and stay with him. She declines, explaining that electroshock works.

Harry Crane (Rich Sommer) joins Joan (Christina Hendricks) on the elevator and sees that she pressed the button for the 38th floor. She claims it is an accident and deflects Harry's questions about the agency potentially moving to another floor. At a partners meeting, Joan announces revenue is up 34% from last year, making it their best-ever quarter. She has plans to meet with the building manager about new office space, but cautions against overextending and suggests postponing a final decision until June. The partners agree.

At CGC, Ted Chaough (Kevin Rahm) tosses Peggy (Elisabeth Moss) an unlabeled carton of a Philip Morris' "top secret ladies' cigarette" and tells her to: "Smoke it, name it, sell it."

At the Draper home, Megan's visiting mother Marie (Julia Ormond) consoles her when she receives a rejected screen test reel. Megan and her friend Emily (Emily Foxler) discuss the difficulty of finding work as actresses. The phone rings and Megan answers, but no one responds. Emily asks if Don can get her an audition for Butler shoes' "Beauty and the Beast" commercial. Megan agrees, but later gives Don a copy of her own screen test instead. He refuses to recommend her, asserting she wants to be "somebody's discovery, not somebody's wife". Roger calls the Draper home pretending to be Emile and asks for Marie. Roger admits to her that he hung up on Megan several times that day and invites Marie to his room at the Stanhope Hotel for a rendezvous. Marie later lambasts Megan for feeling sorry for herself and calls her ungrateful. She joins Roger at the Stanhope, where he tells her Lane has died and asks her to take LSD with him. She declines, asking him to not ask her to take care of him.

Joan, still visibly despondent over Lane's suicide, informs Don that SCDP will receive a $175,000 (equivalent to $1,689,746 in 2025) insurance payout for Lane's death. He tells her to cut a check to repay Lane's wife the $50,000 (equivalent to $482,784 in 2025) Lane gave the company after Lucky Strike left, but without asking for a vote of the partners. He later visits Rebecca Pryce and hands her the $50,000 check. After showing Don the photo of Dolores and asking who she is, Rebecca accuses the agency of short-changing Lane and tells him to not leave thinking he has done anything for anyone but himself.

Trudy (Alison Brie) shows Pete her plans for a backyard pool, but he calls it "permanent" and warns that daughter Tammy could drown. She chastises him, saying she is tired of the "doom and gloom". He later visits Beth at the hospital. When she does not recognize him, he tells her he is visiting a friend who became heartbroken after an affair ended.

Don arrives home to find a drunken Megan, who throws herself at him and says her sex appeal is the reason he will not give her acting career a chance. Marie advises him to help Megan through this crisis, so he will have the life he desires. He later visits the dentist for an extraction and, while anesthetized, sees Adam's ghost, who tells him it is not his tooth that is rotten. Don goes to a movie theater and sees Peggy seated, about to watch Casino Royale (1967). They're happy to see each other and make amends. Don tells her he is proud of her success but did not know it would be without him.

Howard wakes Pete on the train. Pete argues that Howard could not wait to hospitalize Beth and "erase her brain". Realizing Pete has slept with Beth, Howard throws his fists at Pete, who then fights with the conductor and is kicked off the train. At home, Pete tells Trudy he fell asleep at the wheel and drove into a ditch. Concerned about his welfare, she agrees that he should have an apartment in the city.

Alone at the office, Don watches Megan's screen test and smiles. Joan shows the partners around the prospective new office space. Dressed as "Beauty", Megan kisses Don on the set of Butler's commercial and tells him she loves him. He watches her a moment, then walks off. He sits down at a bar and orders an Old Fashioned.

On her first business trip, Peggy looks out of her motel room window and sees two dogs mating. She is taken aback at first, but then gets into bed with a glass of wine and her work and smiles. At home, Pete sits in the dark with headphones on, eyes closed. Roger stands naked on a chair facing the hotel window, arms outstretched anticipating his LSD to hit. A blonde approaches Don at the bar, tells him her girlfriend (a brunette) is interested, and asks if he is alone. He turns and looks at her.

== Production ==
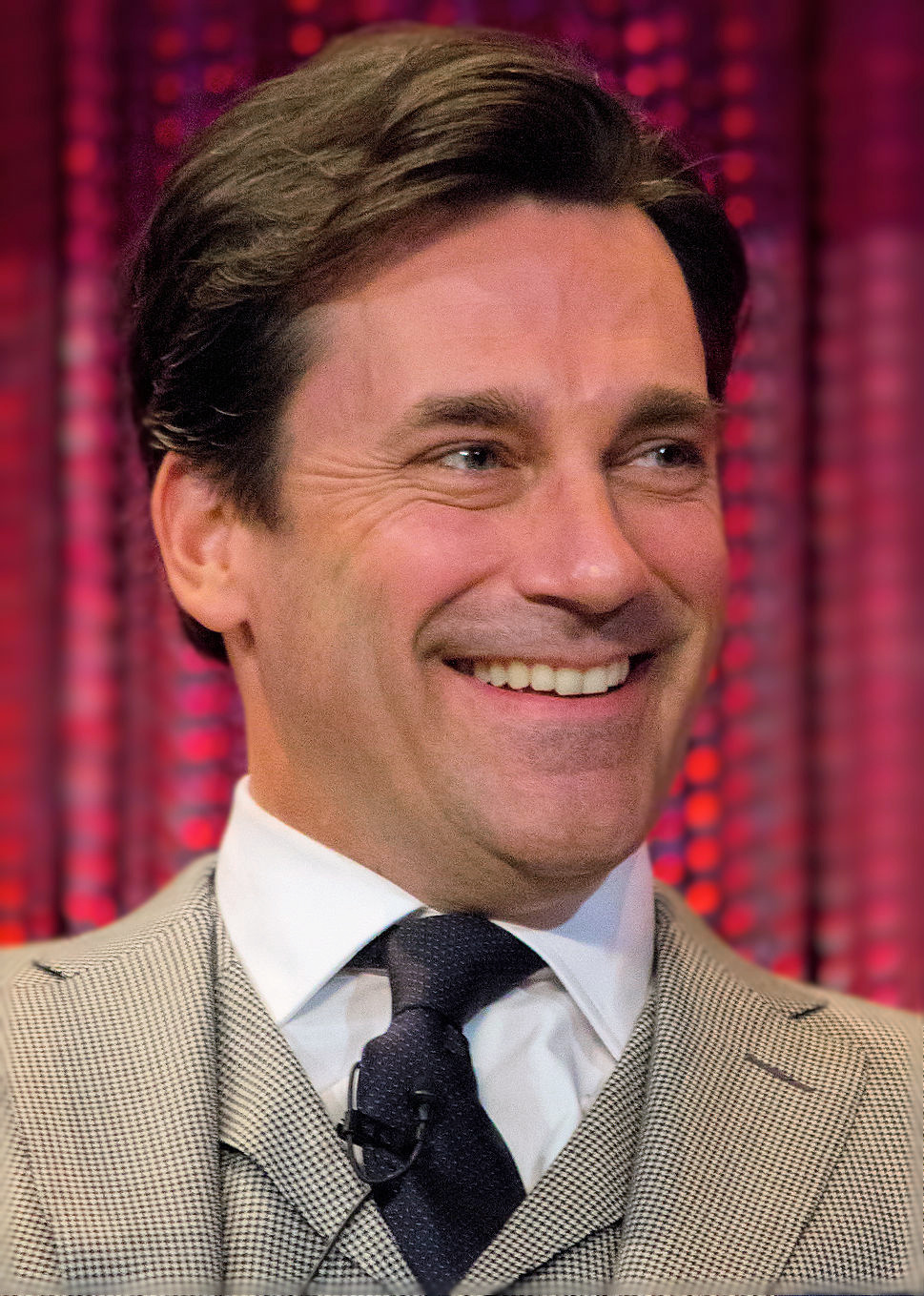
"The Phantom" explores the guilt of various characters, including Don Draper (Hamm), who feels responsible for the death of his brother Adam.

As in past seasons, Mad Men creator Matthew Weiner started writing "The Phantom" by conjuring up the final images:

"I envisioned in the beginning that Peggy would be in that hotel room, seeing those dogs [copulating] in the parking lot, and that she would be happy about being on her first business trip; and that Pete would have this moment of realizing what had happened to him, and this activity was a symbol that something bigger was wrong; Roger would long to get that feeling back, because it had worn off; and that Don would be in that bar. That was the last image, always, that someone would come up and say, 'Are you alone?' And we wouldn't know what he answers."

"The Phantom" metaphorically depicts the guilt and contrition of various characters of the series, including main character Don Draper, who feels that he encouraged one of his coworkers to commit suicide, and his wife Megan, who is conflicted with her aspirations and the slights from her mother. The death of Lane Pryce, who dies in "Commissions and Fees", looms over the episode. Although Lane's name is not mentioned, Weiner noted that the audience could discern his presence:

"We feel his presence in conversations with Joan in the office, certainly when Don goes to see Rebecca [Lane's widow], we see his chair there in the background."

Although The New York Times columnist Dave Iztkoff suggested that "The Phantom" was a deliberate tribute to The Sopranos finale "Made in America", Weiner proclaimed otherwise:

"I say this without any humility whatsoever, that anything that people find comparable to The Sopranos is flattering to me. It was not deliberate by any means — this not the end of the show. We have to come back next season and we don't know how he's going to answer but we know he's in a different place. But you recognize that guy when he looks up. We haven't seen him in a while."

Themes relating to feminism are imbued in "The Phantom", particularly in a scene where Peggy goes to see a film with Don. To Elisabeth Moss, this scene was fundamental for her character's progression, as it demonstrated that Peggy and Don were equals for the first time: "For once, they were just friends meeting at a movie theater." As Weiner summed up: "There's a new respect. He's very frank with her and they're much more like colleagues now that he doesn't own her anymore." In another scene, Peggy arrives at a hotel in Richmond, Virginia, where she is staying for a business conference: "Then she gets to fly for the first time [...] and she's staying at this Holiday Inn, and there's these dogs outside of the window, and she has her work on the bed and her wine. She's by herself, and she's so supremely happy." In making the stunt, the trainers affirmed that the dogs may copulate during production; the incident did take place on the last day of shooting on the set of a parking lot of a replica of a Holiday Inn, according to Weiner: "It was incredible to me — these dogs have been waiting for that moment their whole lives. We got what we needed, they got their treat, it was over."

In crafting the wardrobe for Megan throughout "The Phantom", costume designer Janie Bryant studied the mod subculture, which was then at its apex. In particular, Megan sports a burgundy overcoat embroidered with windowpane patterns, strikingly reminiscent of one worn by the English model Twiggy.

== Reception ==
=== Critical reception ===
The finale received mixed to positive reviews from critics. Alan Sepinwall of HitFix commented:

"Some of the most memorable scenes and moments of the series' run occurred over these last three months. 'The Phantom' was an episode that seemed to take some of the smaller earlier missteps [of the season] and magnify them. If not for a great final 10 minutes or so... I'd be going into [the] hiatus feeling much more sour about the season than I should."

Newsday's Verne Gay said of "The Phantom":

"...just another episode... What was lacking, however, has been much the same as the rest of the season — a certain passion, or emotional resonance. It all felt terribly chilly and remote — characters in service of Matt Weiner's grand overarching themes, as opposed to an episode in service of their hearts."

More approvingly, Matt Zoller Seitz, writing in New York Magazine's Vulture blog, wrote of the finale:

"...a summation of core Mad Men themes: the displacement of an existing order by a new one; the gradual, mysterious, outwardly imperceptible changes experienced by individuals, businesses, cities, and nations over decades; and the possibility of reinventing oneself and starting over, again and again and again."

=== Ratings ===
"The Phantom" garnered the highest ratings for a Mad Men season finale to date, attracting 2.7 million viewers. 1.4 million adults in Mad Men's core demographic of the 25-54 age range watched the finale while 1.2 million viewers in the 18-49 demographic viewed the finale. AMC President Charlie Collier responded:

"As in each season prior, Season 5 is now Mad Men's most-watched season, an uncommon television growth record and a testament to the ongoing quality and uniqueness of this rare property. I'd be remiss if I didn't point out that the record live-same-day Nielsen ratings that gain so much attention are only a small part of the Mad Men success story. Congratulations to the entire Mad Men team on another terrific season."

=== Accolades ===
Julia Ormond received a nomination for the Primetime Emmy Award for Outstanding Guest Actress in a Drama Series for her work as Marie Calvet for the 64th Primetime Emmy Awards. The episode also received nominations for Outstanding Cinematography for a Single-Camera Series and Outstanding Hairstyling for a Single-Camera Series.
