= The Other Woman (Mad Men) =

- Mad Men episode
- Episode no.: Season 5 Episode 11
- Directed by: Phil Abraham
- Written by: Semi Chellas; Matthew Weiner
- Original air date: May 27, 2012
- Running time: 48 minutes

Guest appearances
- Alison Brie as Trudy Campbell; Joel Murray as Freddy Rumsen; Ben Feldman as Michael Ginsberg; Christine Estabrook as Gail Holloway; Kevin Rahm as Ted Chaough; Gary Basaraba as Herb Rennet

Episode chronology
← Previous "Christmas Waltz"	Next → "Commissions and Fees"
- Mad Men season 5

"The Other Woman" is the eleventh episode of the fifth season of the American television drama series Mad Men and the 63rd episode of the series overall. It is co-written by Semi Chellas and Matthew Weiner, and directed by Phil Abraham. It aired on AMC in the United States on May 27, 2012.

The episode takes place in January 1967. Pete asks Joan to make a personal and moral sacrifice to ensure the company lands the Jaguar account. Meanwhile, the creatives work long nights to come up with the perfect pitch for the presentation. Don becomes furious after learning of the impact Megan's new profession will have on their life. Feeling unappreciated, Peggy has lunch with Freddy Rumsen, who encourages her to make a move. Peggy then meets with Ted Chaough, from rival firm CGC, and accepts an offer for chief copywriter.

"The Other Woman" was critically acclaimed, with some critics calling it one of the best episodes of the series. Jon Hamm, Elisabeth Moss, and Christina Hendricks were lauded by journalists for their performances in this episode. "The Other Woman" was watched by 2.07 million viewers and received an adult 18–49 rating of 0.6, marking a slightly higher viewership than the previous episode.

== Plot ==
The SCDP Jaguar team discusses taglines. Don reminds them not to use the word "mistress," as it's vulgar. Peggy asks for Don's approval on her work, but he brushes her off and tells her that she is in charge of all ongoing business until Jaguar is done. Peggy watches with envy as the Jaguar team, from which she's been excluded due to her gender, is served a lobster lunch.

Ken and Pete dine with Herb Rennet, head of the dealers' association and a member of Jaguar's selection committee. Herb suggests SCDP’s competitive standing might be improved if they arrange for him to sleep with Joan. The next day, Pete presents the proposal to Joan, who reacts with outrage and disgust. When Peter asks Joan what a night with Herb would cost, she dismissively replies that he "couldn't afford it".

Subbing in for Ginsberg while he works on Jaguar, Peggy attends a conference call with Chevalier Blanc. The company wants to pull a planned ad, but she spontaneously comes up with a suitable change to the existing ad and wins the client over. Ken and Harry applaud her ingenuity.

Pete presents Herb's proposal at a partners meeting, guaranteeing SCDP will lose the account if they do not comply. Don rejects the idea, insisting the work can win them the account without Herb's vote, and leaves. The remaining partners reluctantly agree to offer Joan $50,000 after Pete lies and says that Joan seemed open to the idea. They decide to withhold Christmas bonuses and extend their credit line to cover the cost, unaware that Lane had already extended the credit line by $50,000 a month ago.

Don instructs the Jaguar team to ditch the mistress concept because it is vulgar. Harry, Peggy and Ken bring him the news about the new Chevalier Blanc ad, which is set in Paris. They praise Peggy's creative solution. Don says Ginsberg will take over once the Jaguar pitch is finished. Peggy, frustrated that Ginsberg will get the credit for her idea, quips that she is not in charge of everything. Don snaps and throws money in Peggy's face, telling her to go to Paris. Ken later checks in on Peggy, reminding her of their pact to stick together if one of them was to leave SCDP, and suggests they can start to interview with other agencies and find a new opportunity, but Peggy brushes this off.

After Megan visits the SCDP office before an audition, Ginsberg observes her confidence and independence. He later approaches Don with a new Jaguar concept likening the car to an unattainable woman: "Jaguar: At last, something beautiful you can truly own."

Lane advises Joan to demand a 5% partnership stake in the company, which will take care of her and her son for much longer than the $50,000, which would cripple the company. Joan later tells Pete she wants a partnership, comprising 5% of the business and voting rights, in exchange for her spending the night with Herb. Pete later tells Don, and he visits Joan's apartment to dissuade her. She thanks him and wishes him luck on the presentation, but it is eventually revealed that, unbeknownst to Don, her sexual encounter with Herb had already taken place.

Pete tells Trudy he wants an apartment in the city, but she refuses, telling him that his love affair with Manhattan is over and that they should be trying for a second child.

The next day, Megan tells Don that her audition gained her a callback for Little Murders and rehearsals begin shortly in Boston. He voices his displeasure at her being gone for three months. She accuses him of expecting her acting career to fail. When the callback does not go well, she tells him that, if she has to choose between him and the play, she would choose him, but will hate him for it. He assures her that he does not want her to fail, and they reconcile.

Over lunch with Freddy Rumsen, Peggy gripes about her exclusion from Jaguar and her treatment by Don. She considers getting another job offer to throw in his face, but Freddy advises her to actually leave, and offers to help. Peggy later meets Ted Chaough of Cutler Gleason and Chaough to discuss a job. He praises her work. She asks to be copy chief at his firm on an $18,000 salary. Chaough offers her the job at a $19,000 salary, which she accepts.

The next day, Don presents the pitch to Jaguar. Herb smiles as Don unveils the tagline.

The following day, Roger summons all the partners to his office to learn the fate of their Jaguar presentation. Don locks eyes with Joan when she joins them, realizing that she has, in fact, slept with Herb. Roger receives the congratulatory confirmation call from Jaguar, and the office erupts in celebration. In Don's office, Peggy informs him she has accepted a job with CGC. He thinks she is asking for a raise and attempts to negotiate with her, but she tells him it is not about money. She holds back tears as he kisses her hand. She walks out of the office and smiles as she waits for an elevator.

== Production ==
The episode was co-written by Semi Chellas and Matthew Weiner, and directed by Phil Abraham. Weiner said in August 2012 that he intended for Peggy's departure from SCDP to be in "The Other Woman", which is centered on Joan: "[the episode is] literally about the quantification and value of women in the workplace and the relationship of their sexuality to it. I knew that on a subconscious level at the writing stage, because of the way the stories went together. As these stories fold in together, it starts to become about that, but it was always about what you have to do to get ahead, in a very simple way, and the opportunities to get ahead."

The nonlinear narrative involving Joan's storyline and Don's Jaguar pitch was "a solution to how to tell the story" according to Weiner. "The ordering of those events really was a problem and we got to a point where we can either show Don doing the pitch, or show Joan being with the guy, but we can't do them both," he said, explaining that he felt "if Don gives the pitch after [the audience has] seen Joan do this, no one is going to listen to a word that he says. It doesn't matter how good it is. [The audience is] not going to believe he could have won."

Chellas "had this great idea, this elliptical thing, which we really loaded up with cues so that you would know at the end that Don was too late. Seeing Joan in there, taking the necklace off, and Joan's mother taking Don's hat into the room where Joan was, and then Joan putting on the green robe and coming out, seeing that behind-the-scenes moment the second time really cemented it." Weiner said this allowed them to "show Joan going through with it 24 hours beforehand, and then show Don giving this pitch that the audience is convinced is a great pitch. Then you slowly dissolve back to the reality of Don coming in [to work] pretty happy, Joan asking how it went, and Roger having this dead response—'it was one of his good ones'—and Don wondering why Joan's not more excited."

Abraham spoke about shooting a scene of the episode in August 2012:

Sometimes the toughest moments come where you least expect them. In this episode, that moment was Don throwing money in Peggy's face. It was a pivotal story point and didn't seem like it would be a hard beat to hit. During rehearsal when Jon Hamm threw the money at Lizzie Moss, it beaned her right between the eyes, inadvertently, but it was exactly what the scene required. Of course when we go to shoot the scene after setting the lights, Jon tosses the money at her, but it's just not eliciting the same response. Lizzie tells me it would really help her if Jon just nailed her with the cash again. It's harder than you think to have perfect aim with loose bills in your pocket when your target is 13 feet (4 m) away. It took a few more takes than anyone had patience for, but when the cash finally landed where it needed to, it took Lizzie by surprise all over again, and that was the moment you ended up seeing onscreen.

While discussing the prostitution plot, Christina Hendricks said, "This is a very confusing situation for Joan and for everyone involved. First off, it's just completely insulting. Second of all, it's quite an opportunity. Then all of a sudden you put the money involved or the opportunity involved or you put a label on it, then it becomes a scary road to go down." Hendricks said that Joan's motivation was "protection [for] her child." Hendricks felt that Joan saw herself as an equal in a way to the other partners after going through with the deal, as Joan had seen them do worse things over her thirteen years in employment.

Vincent Kartheiser called the storyline an example of an "amoral" business tactic. Kartheiser described Pete as doing "what he thinks he needs to do to get the account. I don't know if that's always such a good thing, but it's common in business. And I think in that situation, Pete represents that type of businessman." Matthew Weiner and Jared Harris both characterized Lane's decision as two-fold—he gave Joan the best advice for her and for himself.

Jon Hamm praised the prostitution sequence as "Very elegant paired with Don's pitch to Jaguar. This idea of something beautiful that you could possess, that you could own. It's one thing when you're talking about a car. It's something else when you're talking about a human being."

Elisabeth Moss said she was not told by Weiner that Peggy would be leaving SCDP "until we were shooting episode 10, the one right before it. It was unusual that he didn't tell me. He usually tells me what's happening, pitches me things to ask me how they sound." Moss' initial reaction "was just one of feeling like there was really no other logical way to go for her. After everything that had happened for five years, she can't just keep butting her head up against that wall. [...] She's becoming her own person and she needs to have her own place not under Don." Moss also said, "I will thank [Weiner] forever for not telling me. It would have made my life harder. I knew about Peggy's baby in season one. I fought against it, to play it as she was living it, feeling it, and not be in my head. Not knowing Peggy would quit allowed me to find it for myself, to really feel Peggy's growing frustration with Don all season."

According to Moss, Peggy "has the capability of being a Don Draper, and there can't be two of them in the office." The goodbye scene between Don and Peggy was a difficult one to shoot. Moss said, "That scene was a really, really tough scene to do. They didn't tell me they were going to do this, but they told Jon to hold my hand and not let it go. Then he did, and I lost it. Every single one of those tears were absolutely real. She wants to stay with all of her heart. She does not want to leave, but she knows she has to." Hamm said there was "respect, understanding, and admiration between those two characters. This is the exact right time for her to leave."

=== References to other media ===
- Peggy pitches a Lady Godiva-themed ad for Chevalier Blanc.
- Herb mixes metaphors about The Sheik of Araby and Helen of Troy during his assignation with Joan.
- Peter reads Goodnight Moon to his baby and later that night complains to Trudy there are no "goodnight noises" where they live.

== Reception ==
=== Critical reception ===
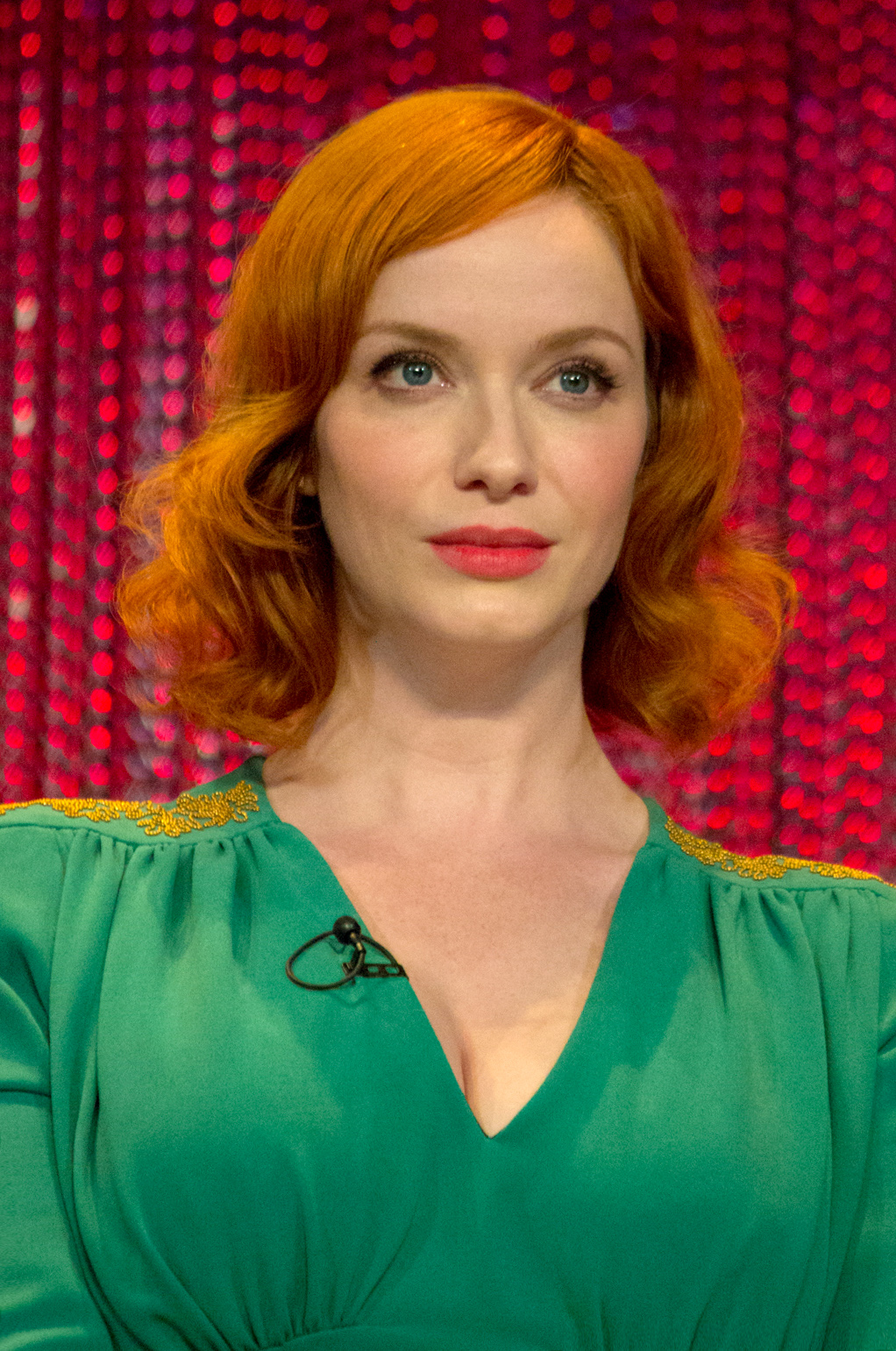
The episode's storyline involving Joan Holloway (Christina Hendricks, pictured) was heavily scrutinised by commentators

The episode received much acclaim from television journalists. The storyline involving Joan's prostituting herself to secure the Jaguar account for Sterling Cooper Draper Pryce came in for particular analysis and scrutiny among journalists, as related to its execution and use of themes of female sexuality and sexual objectification. Alan Sepinwall fought with himself over the execution of the prostitution story in this episode, asking, "If you buy that the partners would be willing to sell Joan, and that Joan would feel the same way, then this is an all-time great episode of the series. But if you don't, then it's Weiner and company making the characters act against their natures to fit the theme." Sepinwall described the story as "something that so fundamentally changes the way you view a number of major characters, and the show that uses them, that it has to be just about perfect to work, and maybe not even then." Emily VanDerWerff opined that, "'The Other Woman' shouldn’t work. It’s so obviously constructed to be a 'message' episode, and the message is far from subtle: No matter what we try to do to make them equal, men are always going to turn women into objects on some level, because that’s just how men perceive them." VanDerWerff compared it to the episode "Employee of the Month" of The Sopranos, even going so far as to call "The Other Woman" a stronger episode.

Weiner was "surprised" by the reaction to Joan's storyline:

I knew it was a dramatic moment, and I expected it to be treated as drama, because the stakes were so high, and we knew Joan so well. But I also felt on some level, if we hadn't used the word prostitution in there, it was more about the public nature of what was going on, and also their love for Joan, and the fact that she was put in this position that was so upsetting to people. I was stunned, though, by the suggestion that there were some people questioning about whether she would have actually done this or not. That shocked me. Maybe what they were saying is they were questioning whether they would have done it, but I was hoping, certainly judging on the history of the show and what Joan has done, obviously this is not the first time this has been an issue for her.

In August 2012, Hamm said "The Other Woman" was his favorite episode of the fifth season of Mad Men, and spoke about the reaction to Joan's storyline:

When ["The Other Woman"] aired, people were sort of outraged by the Joan storyline, like, "Oh my God, how could she do that? What is she thinking?" I kind of looked at it and I was like, Wait a minute: Joan's not a saint, first of all. She's having an affair with her boss while she's married. She's slept with at least one other person in the office. So let's back off that thing. And she's also making a very sort of prudent financial decision and very much trading one thing for another. I found the kind of psychological thing of that very interesting.

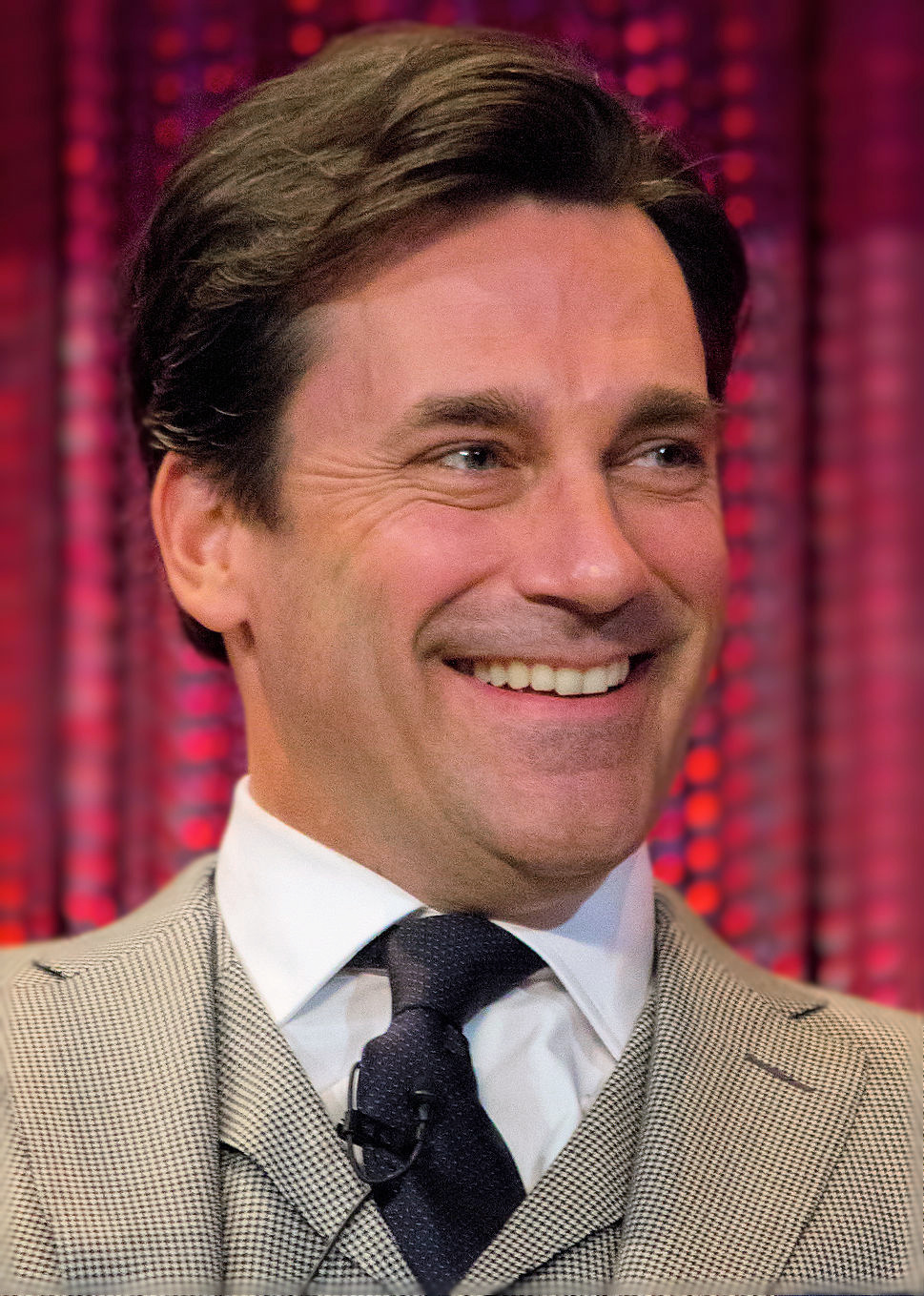
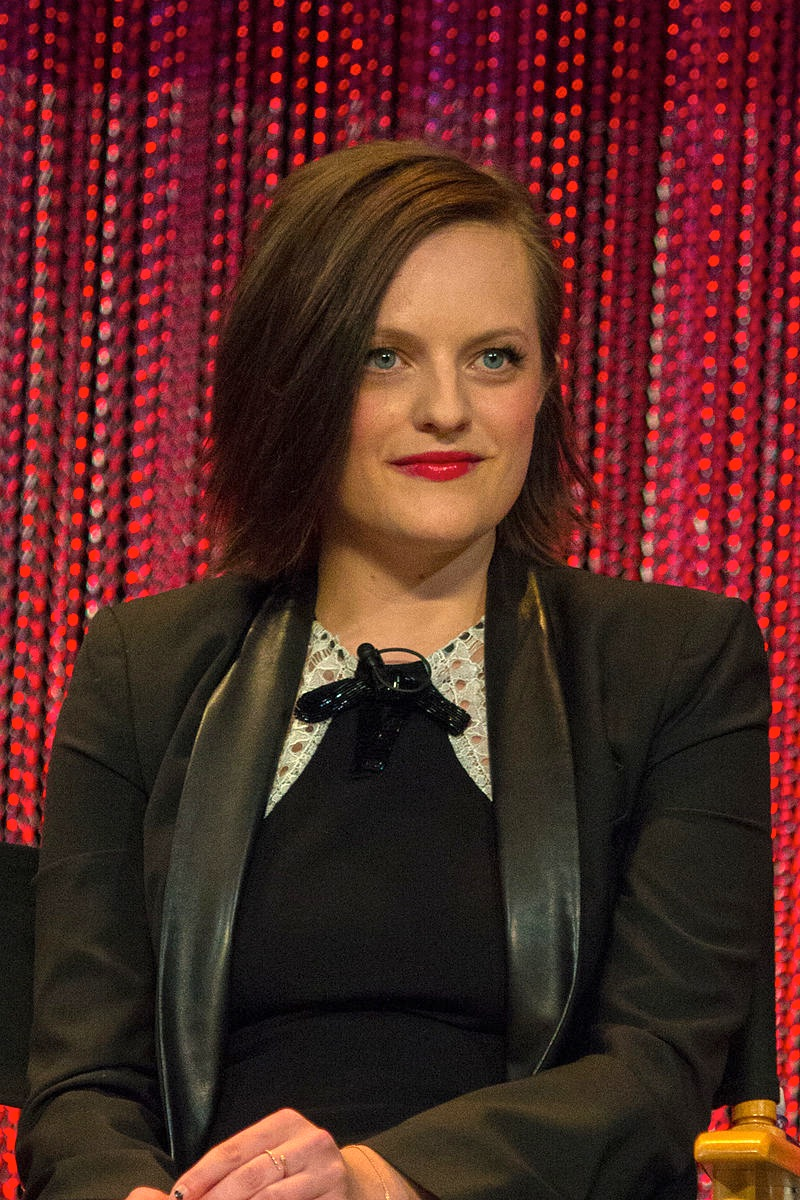
Jon Hamm (left) and Elisabeth Moss (right) both received critical acclaim for their performances during the episode's closing sequence

The final scene in which Peggy leaves both Don and the agency was pinpointed by critics as a standout sequence. Maureen Ryan said, "the scene between Don and Peggy was tremendous, but Jon Hamm and Elisabeth Moss are always magnificent together. It's no coincidence that their final pose—Don at Peggy's waist, kissing her hand—recalled Don's brutal reconciliation with Megan a few weeks ago, kneeling, begging her to stay with him."

In August 2012, Moss said the final scene was her favorite of the season: "It would've been so easy to have it be tears and trauma and music, but it's so simple, almost over before you know it. It brings you to a dark, sad place then gives you this slap in the face when she turns to the elevator and smiles. Matt [Weiner] and I didn't feel it was a sad thing. It says to the audience, 'No, you don't get to cry all night about this.'"

=== Accolades ===
The episode won the Writers Guild of America Award for Episodic Drama.

This episode also received directing and writing nominations for the 64th Primetime Emmy Awards.

Due to their nomination, Jon Hamm, Elisabeth Moss, and Christina Hendricks all submitted this episode for consideration for the Lead Actor, Lead Actress, and Supporting Actress in a Drama Series, respectively, for the 64th Primetime Emmy Awards.

=== Ratings ===
"The Other Woman" was watched by 2.07 million viewers and received an adult 18–49 rating of 0.6, marking a slightly higher viewership than the previous episode.
