= Myra Turley =

American film and television actress

- Occupation: Actress
- Years active: 1985–present

Myra Turley is an American film and television actress, best known as Dale in the 1995 sitcom Muscle, and as Madeline Evelley in Clint Eastwood's Flags of Our Fathers.

Her other appearances include supporting roles in episodes of such television series as Dallas, L.A. Law, Murphy Brown, ER, NYPD Blue, Party of Five, Seinfeld, Friends, That '70s Show, Scrubs and Desperate Housewives. She played Katherine Olson, Peggy Olson's mother, in Mad Men.

== Filmography ==
=== Film ===
Year	Title	Role	Notes
1989	Peacemaker	Miss Rice	Short film
2006	Flags of Our Fathers	Madeline Evelley	
2007	California Dreaming	Irene	
2010	Beautiful Boy	Patty	
2014	Happy for Nothing	Deirdre	Short film
2014	Mourning Glory	Maxine Black-Shore	Short film
2017	The Big Sick	Waiting Room Person 1	

=== Television ===
Year	Title	Role	Notes
1986	Highway to Heaven	Miss Muncie	"Close Encounters of the Heavenly Kind"
1986	Perfect Strangers	Sandra	"Happy Birthday, Baby"
1988	Throb	Louise	"Only the Lonely", "There's No Place Like Home"
1989	L.A. Law	Mary Fitzpatrick	"Barstow Bound"
1989	White Lies	Mrs. Thompkins	TV film
1989	Quantum Leap	Dolores	"Catch a Falling Star"
1990	Daughter of the Streets	Doris	TV film
1990	Beanpole	Ms. Hanley	TV pilot
1990	The Bakery	Doris	TV film
1990	ABC Afterschool Special	Fran	"A Question About Sex"
1990	Ferris Bueller	Miss Connelly	"Between a Rock and Rooney's Place"
1991	Knots Landing	Doris	"In the Dog House"
1992	Condition: Critical	Veronica Neuhouse	TV film
1994	The Second Half	Glynys	"High Nooner"
1994	One West Waikiki	Mrs. Bryan	"'Til Death Do Us Part"
1995	Muscle	Dale	TV series
1995	Empty Nest	Arlene	"Grandma, What Big Eyes You Have"
1995	My Antonia	Mrs. Harling	TV film
1996	ER	Monica Ford	"Baby Shower"
1996	Step by Step	Adele	"Men at Work"
1996	Weird Science	Mrs. Dreesen	"Family Affair"
1996	Brotherly Love	Annica	"The Code of the Guys"
1998	Party of Five	Mrs. Ryerson	"Here and Now"
1998	Seinfeld	Foreman	"The Finale"
1998	You Lucky Dog	Mrs. Mooney	TV film
1999	Sabrina, the Teenage Witch	Mrs. Birkhead	"Whose So-Called Life Is It Anyway?"
1999	Chicago Hope	Helen	"Humpty Dumpty"
2000	Ladies Man	Mrs. Cahill	"12 Angry Kids", "Bad Muthas"
2001	The Geena Davis Show	Grace	"Max Hates Hillary"
2001	Judging Amy	Martha	"The Last Word"
2001	Family Law	Judge Carla DaCosta	"Planting Seeds", "Obligations"
2007	Desperate Housewives	Peggy	"No Fits, No Fights, No Feuds"
2008-2012	Mad Men	Katherine Olson	Recurring role
2009	Cold Case	Margie Everett (2009)	"Breaking News"
2009	Safe Harbor	Linda Rawlings	TV film
2009	Lie to Me	Mrs. Perriman	"Secret Santa"
2010	'Til Death	Mrs. Rooney	Recurring role
2011	Breaking Bad	Caregiver	"Face Off"
2013	Legit	Cybil	"Anger"
2013	Revenge	Sister Rebecca Gallagher	"Masquerade"
2013	Hollywood Acting Studio	June	"How to Act in a Sex Scene"
2015	Rizzoli & Isles	Delores	"Sister Sister"
