= Sadie Alexandru =

American actress (born 1977)

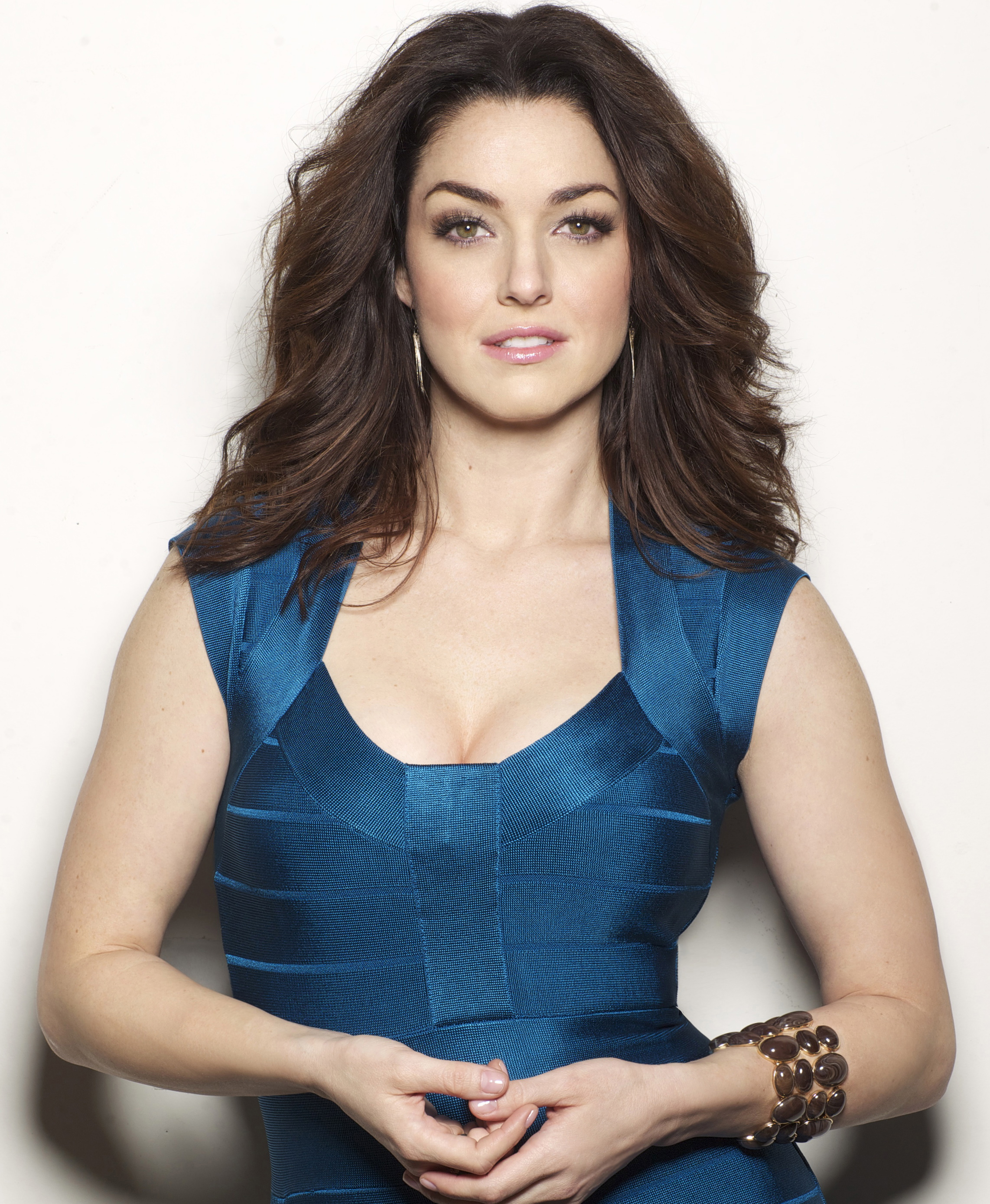
- Born: Sarah Jocelyn Alexandru; December 2, 1977 (age 48); New York City, New York, U.S.
- Occupations: Actress, model
- Years active: 1999–present
- Notable work: Scarlett on Mad Men
- Spouse: Michael "Mike" Dolan (m. 2013)
- Children: 1

Sarah Jocelyn Alexandru (born December 2, 1977) is an American actress and model. Alexandru is best known for playing Scarlett, secretary for media buyer Harry Crane on AMC's drama series Mad Men.

== Early life ==
Sadie Alexandru was born in the Upper East Side, Manhattan and had a passion for ballet from her younger days. She received her Bachelor of Fine Arts degree in Acting from The Mason Gross School of the Arts at Rutgers University. She also studied at the London Academy of Theater under Patron Dame Judi Dench, and at the William Esper Studio in New York City. Alexandru took up permanent residency in Los Angeles, California in January 2006. Her LA training includes: on-camera studies at the Steve Eastin Studio and stunt training at the Academy of Theatrical Combat.

== Career ==
Alexandru is well known for the original “What Happens in Vegas, Stays in Vegas” commercial. She's landed 24 national commercials including ads for Comcast, Jared Jewelers, Swiffer, Coors, Wendy's, Merck, Turbo Tax, Staples, 1-800-Flowers, Milky Way, Hasbro and Bud Light.

Alexandru's first major show was the popular soap opera All My Children and her character's name was Sylvia. She was also a recurring guest star in CBS's long running soap opera As the World Turns and in ABC comedy Carpoolers. Her television credits also include Cinemax's thriller noir Femme Fatales, upcoming musical Kittens in a Cage, Laura Prepon's Neighbros.

In 2012, Alexandru made her debut in the fifth season of AMC's critically acclaimed Emmy Award winning series Mad Men as the new sassy SCDP secretary, Scarlett.

Her film credits include the popular action film Gamer, Broken Horses and Lucy in the Sky Diamond. She is playing the lead role of Firoozeh in the upcoming epic, Sinbad: The Fifth Voyage. Sadie also co-produced and played the role of nudist Natalie Cloonan in the critically acclaimed independent film Act Naturally, which won the Audience Award for Best Feature-Length Narrative in 2012 at both the Los Angeles United Film Festival and its sister festival, the San Francisco United Film Festival.

She is also recognized for her theater works which include the Ovation Award-nominated hit Love Sucks.

== Personal life ==
She is married since July 20, 2013 to Michael "Mike" Dolan, with whom she has one child.

== Filmography ==
=== Film ===
Year	Title	Role	Notes
2008	8 Ball	Michelle	Short
2009	Plus One	Sally	Short
2009	Gamer	Society Victim	
2010	Straw Man	Emily	Short
2010	Bare Knuckles	Maxine	
2011	Act Naturally	Natalie Cloonan	
2011	Expulsion	Liz	Short
2012	Lucy in the Sky with Diamond	Waitress	Short
2013	Starting from Scratch	Jade	
2013	Dinner with Ana	Renata	Short
2014	Sinbad: The Fifth Voyage	Firoozeh	
2015	Broken Horses	Santion's Wife	
2016	Curse of the Phantom Shadow	Gas Pump Girl	
2017	Taste	June	Short
2017	Get You Back	Kathryn	
2019	Act Super Naturally	Natalie Cloonan	

=== Television ===
Year	Title	Role	Notes
1999	All My Children	Sylvia	Episode: "1.7723"
2002	As the World Turns	Tanya Cole	Episode: "1.11833"
2008	Carpoolers	Jogger	Episode: "First Fight"
2012	Femme Fatales	Janelle	Episode: "One Man's Death"
2012–2013	Mad Men	Scarlett	Episodes: "Christmas Waltz", "Commissions and Fees", "The Phantom", "To Have and to Hold"
2014, 2016, 2018	The Fosters	Colleen Jacobs	Episodes: "Padre", "Trust", "Mother's Day"
2015	Kittens in a Cage	Jackie	Episodes: "Ain't Even Got a Mustache", "Have Another Muffin, Nancy"

=== Video Game ===
Year	Title	Role	Notes
2020	Call of Duty: Black Ops Cold War	Aleksandra Valentina	Voice
