= Peggy Olson =

Fictional character from "Mad Men"

- Mad Men character
- Elisabeth Moss as Peggy Olson
- First appearance: "Smoke Gets in Your Eyes" (1.01)
- Last appearance: "Person to Person" (7.14)
- Created by: Matthew Weiner
- Portrayed by: Elisabeth Moss

In-universe information
- Family: Katherine Olson (mother); Anita Respola (sister)
- Relatives: Gerry Respola Jr. (nephew)

Margaret "Peggy" Olson is a fictional character on the AMC television series Mad Men. She was portrayed by Elisabeth Moss and served as the show's female lead. Initially, Peggy is secretary to Don Draper (Jon Hamm), creative director of the advertising agency Sterling Cooper. She soon discovers her passion for copywriting and due to her talent, Draper takes her on as his protégée. She is eventually, albeit temporarily, placed in authority over Draper much to his disdain. Her rise is an integral part of the series and plays a key role in every season of Mad Men. After Don, she has the highest number of episode appearances, appearing in 88 out of the 92 episodes.

Moss received critical acclaim for her performance and received six Primetime Emmy Award nominations, a Golden Globe nomination, three Critics' Choice Television Award nominations, and has been nominated for two individual nominations for the Screen Actors Guild Awards for her performance. She has also won two Screen Actors Guild Award for Outstanding Performance by an Ensemble in a Drama Series along with the cast of Mad Men. The characterization of Peggy Olson also won universal acclaim, with several critics and publications regarding Olson as not only one of the greatest characters of the series, but also on television of the 21st-century, as well as among female characters in TV history.

== Biography ==
Peggy Olson is initially presented as an innocent but determined young woman, eager to be a success in her job at Sterling Cooper after having graduated from the respected Miss Deaver's secretarial school. She was born on May 25, 1939, and was brought up in Bay Ridge, Brooklyn, New York in a Roman Catholic Norwegian and Irish-American family. When she was 12 years old, her father died of a heart attack in front of her.

Peggy has an immense dislike of the double standard in the treatment and expectations of men and women.

Lauren Chval of the Chicago Tribune wrote that Peggy's character "arc" showed the highest degree of change in the show, stating that "No other character has seen the same level of transformation."

=== At Sterling Cooper ===
In the pilot episode, "Smoke Gets in Your Eyes", which takes place in March 1960, Peggy begins work as a secretary for Don Draper (Jon Hamm). Her supervisor, office manager Joan Holloway (Christina Hendricks), directs her in her duties as well as offers personal advice, which includes referring her to a gynecologist to obtain a prescription for birth control pills. When Peggy initially meets account executive Pete Campbell (Vincent Kartheiser), he makes rude comments about her appearance, and Don defends her. Later that night, after his bachelor party, Pete shows up at Peggy's apartment drunk. Despite Pete's offensive remarks earlier, Peggy sleeps with him. Months later, Peggy and Pete have another sexual encounter on Pete's office couch, early one morning before other employees arrive.

In "Babylon", Sterling Cooper executive Freddy Rumsen (Joel Murray) notices Peggy's sharp mind and creativity during a focus group for Belle Jolie lipstick. After hearing Peggy's insightful remarks during a brainstorming session, Rumsen comments that her performance "was like watching a dog play the piano". She is asked to write some copy for the campaign in addition to her other duties. The campaign is a success, and she is made to work on other campaigns. As a result, she is soon promoted to Junior Copywriter and ceases being Don's secretary. She reveals herself to be highly ambitious, and her approach to her work is compared to Don's. Later, after Rumsen is fired, Peggy convinces Senior Partner Roger Sterling (John Slattery) to give her Rumsen's office.

During her first year at Sterling Cooper, Peggy begins to gain weight, which appears to confuse her. The male account executives begin to mock her, and Joan makes unkind remarks to her about her appearance in an attempt to encourage her to lose weight and dismisses her success at copywriting. When Peggy is promoted, she begins experiencing severe abdominal pain; she attributes it to a "bad sandwich" from the office cart and heads to St. Mary's Hospital in Brooklyn. She is shocked and in denial when informed she's actually in labor. As she gets up to leave, she collapses, and the hospital staff moves her into a hospital room in labor and delivery. She gives birth to a healthy baby boy, but she refuses to hold him or even look at him.

Season 2 begins 15 months later, on February 14, 1962, with a slim Peggy and no mention of the birth. Her long absence (not shown) is a mystery to Sterling Cooper's employees. One co-worker jokes during a meeting that "Draper knocked her up and she's dropped nine pounds, eight ounces." Pete has heard through office gossip that Peggy went to a fat farm.

It is revealed later in the season, through a series of flashbacks, that Peggy's family has covered up Peggy's sudden disappearance from Sterling Cooper. They tell Don that Peggy is in quarantine with tuberculosis, but she is actually in a mental hospital because she has had a break with reality after giving birth. Don becomes suspicious and seeks her out at the hospital. He encourages her to do whatever the doctors are asking her to do and move forward as if nothing ever happened, adding, "It will shock you how much this never happened."

Peggy's out-of-wedlock pregnancy causes tension with her deeply Catholic mother, Katherine, and sister, Anita. When a visiting parish priest, Father Gill (Colin Hanks), befriends Peggy after seeking out her advice regarding public speaking, Anita goes to confession and tells him that she hates and resents Peggy for seducing a married man, getting pregnant and abandoning her child, then pretending as though nothing happened. Afterward Father Gill repeatedly tries to persuade Peggy to take confession, which Peggy consistently declines to do. After season two, she is no longer seen attending mass, but notably performs the sign of the cross before taking her first plane flight in "Waterloo."

Toward the end of season two, Peggy becomes frustrated that she is often left out of business meetings that occur in mens-only environments after work hours. Joan advises her to "stop dressing like a little girl," which leads Peggy to start dressing more professionally and also to agree to a dramatic haircut from copywriter Kurt Smith (Edin Gali), who cuts her demure ponytail in favor of a shorter, more modern hairstyle.

In the Season 2 finale, set during the Cuban Missile Crisis, Pete confesses to Peggy that he's in love with her and wants to be with her. Peggy tells him she could have forced him to be with her if she wanted to, then confesses that he got her pregnant and she gave the baby away. Pete is stunned and even suggests it would have been better if he hadn't known.

In Season 3 (1963), Peggy's ideas for advertising, while respected, are frequently ignored. In particular, her comment that Salvatore Romano's (Bryan Batt) proposed ad campaign for Pepsi's new diet cola Patio (involving a shot-for-shot remake of Ann-Margret's opening scene in Bye Bye Birdie) would not appeal to the target audience, is dismissed. When the ad in question is shot down by Pepsi (whose idea it was in the first place), she smiles to herself. When she attempts to get a raise, Don shuts her down.

Due to the lengthy commute from Brooklyn, Peggy decides to move to an apartment in Manhattan. She posts an ad at SC for a roommate. Following Joan's advice to make her ad about fun and good times, and post it somewhere other than at SC, Peggy finds a prospective roommate in Karen Ericson (Carla Gallo); her conversation with Karen reveals that Peggy is Norwegian on her father's side.

Peggy becomes romantically involved with Duck Phillips (Mark Moses), who is seeking to lure her and Pete away to his firm. In considering the move, Peggy is motivated by how underutilized she has been at Sterling Cooper, and by Draper in particular, who has shut down her attempt to get a raise. As a result, when Don comes telling her to pack her things and join his new agency, Peggy refuses, noting that everyone thinks he does her work and that while she's had generous offers to join other agencies, Don ordered her to join him instead of actually asking her. Later, Don comes to Peggy at her apartment and tells her how much he values her, and that if she refuses again he'll spend the rest of his life trying to hire her. Peggy accepts his offer and becomes a part of Sterling Cooper Draper Pryce.

=== At Sterling Cooper Draper Pryce (SCDP) ===
In the fourth season (1964–65), Peggy perseveres as a trusted member of the SCDP creative staff, despite lingering resentment and patronizing behavior from most of the men she works with. Her affair with Duck has ended and she dates a young, weak-willed man named Mark (Blake Bashoff) but they break up when she chooses to work late instead of coming to a birthday dinner with her family he has planned. Peggy then meets political journalist Abe Drexler (Charlie Hofheimer) through her new friend Joyce Ramsay (Zosia Mamet), a photo editor for Life magazine. Peggy is initially repelled by Abe's criticisms of advertising and his dismissal of her struggles as a professional woman, but a romance develops between them.

When Lucky Strike, SCDP's biggest client, ends their relationship with the firm, Peggy is responsible, essentially, for saving the company by signing Topaz Pantyhose. This breaks a long streak of clients either leaving SCDP, or refusing to sign with them.

In season five, Peggy is given more responsibility, but her relationship with Don is strained as his new marriage to Megan causes him to neglect his work. She fails repeatedly to please Heinz Baked Beans's executive, and is finally removed from the account when she mimics Don's authoritative style but ends up offending the client instead.

Peggy also clashes with Art Director Stan Rizzo (Jay R. Ferguson), who antagonizes her by making crude passes at her. While they are spending the weekend together working in a hotel room, Peggy finally calls Stan's bluff and takes off her clothes. He does likewise and is alarmed that he's aroused by Peggy's body, which he has always insulted. Peggy is able to continue working productively, and afterward they have a more positive working relationship.

In the season five episode "The Other Woman", Peggy saves an account by coming up with an idea on the fly for an ad set in Paris. Her colleagues are impressed, but Don, frustrated by the lack of progress with another client, takes it out on Peggy and humiliates her. Peggy meets with Freddy Rumsen, who encourages her to move on from SCDP. Peggy then accepts an offer from another agency, Cutler, Gleason and Chaough, to become their Copy Chief with a generous salary. When she gives Don her notice, he initially doesn't believe her, then offers to beat whatever salary she's been offered, but Peggy remains firm, and Don kisses her hand before she leaves.

=== At Cutler, Gleason, and Chaough (CGC) ===
Peggy is widely respected by her superiors and feared by her subordinates at CGC. Her secretary recommends she try a little positive reinforcement along with her criticism, which gets mixed results. Peggy frequently works late, sharing gossip and news with Stan by phone. At one point, CGC partner Ted Chaough (Kevin Rahm) kisses Peggy, and later, she reveals she has feelings for him as well.

In "The Flood", Peggy is nominated for a prestigious advertising award for her Heinz Baked Beans ad, which she developed with Draper's wife, Megan (Jessica Paré). They are the only SCDP/SC&P nominees, despite the fact that neither works there anymore. The evening is interrupted by news of the assassination of Martin Luther King, Jr., and in a final frame showing the CLIO Award in Megan's living room, the audience learns that Megan and Peggy won the award.

When Draper and Ted join forces to pitch Chevrolet, leading the two firms to merge, they turn to Peggy to draft the press release. Both are oblivious to Peggy's distress.

=== At Sterling Cooper & Partners (SC&P) ===
When Draper starts a new firm called Sterling Cooper & Partners, he asks Peggy to join, with the promise of greater creative control and a bigger salary. Joan assigns Peggy to the office previously used by Harry Crane and Pete Campbell, which features an awkwardly placed pillar. Peggy has been unanimously declared Copy Chief but finds it very difficult to serve two masters, as she is almost continually put in the middle of Draper and Ted's leadership squabbles. As Peggy's attraction to Ted grows, her relationship with Abe suffers. They grow further apart as his politics become more radical, and she becomes increasingly unhappy living in the building Abe suggested they buy, which is in a dangerous neighborhood, and decides to sell it. That night, while frightened, she accidentally stabs him. In the ambulance, Abe labels her an enemy to his beliefs, and they break up.

In the Season 6 finale, "In Care Of", Peggy leaves the office for a date in a revealing dress, smelling of Chanel No. 5. When she returns, Ted is waiting at her apartment; he states that he loves her and plans to leave his wife, and he and Peggy consummate their relationship. The next morning, Ted asks Don to let him manage the SC&P office in California, in an effort to put as much distance between himself and Peggy as possible, and to achieve a fresh start with his family. Don eventually concedes, and Ted informs Peggy of his plans. Peggy is angered by Ted's unilateral decision and says, "Well, aren't you lucky, to have decisions?"

In Season 7, Peggy becomes frustrated that Don's replacement, Lou, does not have the same standards and has little respect for her talents. She complains that the work is not as good as it was under Don, even though the company remains profitable, and dislikes working with Lou, who is dismissive and rude to Peggy. When Don returns to SC&P under numerous restrictions, Peggy is forced to bring him on as her subordinate for the Burger Chef campaign. Don at first is infuriated at having to work under his own protégé, refusing to turn in work, but soon resigns himself to the role, realizing he won't be able to return to his previous position if he doesn't cooperate. They create a great ad together, but Peggy is undercut when Pete insists that Don give the presentation. At the last minute, however, Don tells Peggy to do it. She gives a powerful presentation and wins the business for SC&P.

Peggy is reluctant to join McCann Erickson after they absorb SC&P, but a recruiter tells her that it's the best choice for her career at the moment. Stan goes with her, and soon afterward Joan tries to lure Peggy into her new film production company, but she chooses to stay in advertising. Peggy is concerned for Don when he stops coming to work and basically vanishes. He calls her, deeply troubled, from a wellness retreat in California, telling her he realized he never said goodbye to her. Peggy tries to persuade him that he is not the bad person he thinks he is and tries to convince him to come home. After Don hangs up, she calls Stan and expresses concern. He comforts her and they finally admit they're in love with each other. Peggy is last seen working, with Stan embracing her lovingly.

== See also ==
- Mary Wells Lawrence – the first woman to own and run a major national advertising agency in the US
