= Christmas Waltz (Mad Men) =

- Mad Men episode
- Harry Crane (Rich Sommer) attends a Hare Krishna meeting with Paul Kinsey (Michael Gladis), who makes his first appearance since the third season finale with a radically different appearance.
- Episode no.: Season 5 Episode 10
- Directed by: Michael Uppendahl
- Written by: Victor Levin; Matthew Weiner
- Original air date: May 20, 2012
- Running time: 48 minutes

Guest appearances
- Michael Gladis as Paul Kinsey; Embeth Davidtz as Rebecca Pryce; Teyonah Parris as Dawn Chambers; Ben Feldman as Michael Ginsberg; Anna Wood as Lakshmi Bennett; Nicholas Guest as Anthony Marsh; James DuMont as Walt Jarvis; Mitchell Fink as Eric Pierce; Beth Hall as Caroline; Sadie Alexandru as Scarlett; Stephanie Drake as Meredith; Wajid as A. C. Bhaktivedanta Swami Prabhupada; Andrew Goodloe as Hare Krishna; Eli Bildner as Kid; Brian Ruppert as Man; Christopher Devlin as Actor; Aimée Deshayes as Actress; Elisha Yaffe as Stewart

Episode chronology
← Previous "Dark Shadows"	Next → "The Other Woman"
- Mad Men season 5

"Christmas Waltz" is the tenth episode of the fifth season of the American television drama series Mad Men and the 62nd episode of the series overall. It is written by Victor Levin and Matthew Weiner, and directed by Michael Uppendahl. It originally aired on the AMC channel in the United States on May 20, 2012.

The episode starts on Pearl Harbor Day (December 7) 1966. Harry Crane tries to help out old friend Paul Kinsey, who has fallen on hard times and become involved with Hare Krishna and a bohemian devotee girlfriend. Lane Pryce resorts to desperation and subterfuge while trying to solve his own cash problems. Don and Joan commiserate with each other over drinks after Joan is served divorce papers. Following their conversation, Don's interest in his work is re-ignited, as he dedicates himself to landing the Jaguar account.

While the episode was well-received, it was the lowest-rated episode of Mad Men since the penultimate episode of the third season. This episode also marks the first appearance of Michael Gladis (Paul Kinsey) since the third season's finale "Shut the Door. Have a Seat".

== Plot ==
Lane Pryce's attorney abroad instructs him to wire £2,900 (US$8,000) to England to cover back taxes within two days. Lane (Jared Harris) worries he cannot come up with the money. Harry (Rich Sommer) reports a strong first-quarter outlook to Lane but warns that actual commitments from clients are still uncertain. Lane visits the firm's bank manager and convinces him to authorize a $50,000 credit extension.

Harry reluctantly agrees to meet with Paul Kinsey (Michael Gladis), believing that Paul wants a job at SCDP. Paul, wearing a robe and sporting a shaved head, greets Harry at a Hare Krishna gathering and introduces his friend Lakshmi (Anna Wood), who convinces Harry to join them in a group chant. In a taxi after the gathering, Paul admits to Harry that he loves Lakshmi but the Krishna movement does not make him happy. He hands Harry a spec script he wrote for Star Trek entitled "The Negron Complex" and asks Harry to pass it along to NBC. Harry and Peggy (Elisabeth Moss) agree that the script is awful, and Peggy advises Harry to tell Paul the truth. Lakshmi shows up at the firm and seduces Harry in his office. Afterward, she reveals that Paul is the movement's best recruiter and, subtly blackmailing Harry over what just happened, she tells Harry to stay away or he might turn Paul into a "gross materialist." Harry later lies to Paul that his business connection liked the script but passed on it. He gives Paul $500 and a ticket to Los Angeles, urging him to leave the Krishnas and start over.

Pete (Vincent Kartheiser) tells Don (Jon Hamm) and Roger (John Slattery) that Edwin Baker has been fired from Jaguar and their firm is back in contention for the account. Lane calls a partners meeting to announce they can hand out Christmas bonuses thanks to a $50,000 surplus; however, Don recommends waiting until the Christmas party. Pete agrees, explaining the Jaguar announcement will be a sufficient morale boost until then; this gets no response from anyone, frustrating Pete. Lane sneaks into the office after hours and forges Don's signature on a $7,500 check written out to himself. The next day, he assures his attorney that the funds are available, but hangs up when the attorney mentions his fee. Megan (Jessica Paré) and Don watch the play America Hurrah, in which a character rants against TV advertisements. After the play, they argue about its negative portrayal of advertising.

In Joan's (Christina Hendricks) office, a drunken Roger says he wants to financially support her and Kevin. She refuses, claiming the child would be better off without Roger's involvement. Joan is later summoned to reception and receives divorce papers from a process server. She loses her temper with Meredith, the receptionist, and smashes the model Mohawk airplane on Meredith's desk. Don takes her to a Jaguar showroom where they pretend to be a couple looking for a new car. Don offers the salesman a $6,000 deposit to let them test-drive an XK-E alone. At a bar, Joan reminisces about the days when, if she was called to reception, it was to receive flowers from various suitors. Don admits that, due to the sheer volume of flowers she received, he thought she was dating Aly Khan. She replies that her mother raised her to be admired. Don offers to return the Jaguar by himself and encourages Joan to speak with a man eyeing her in the bar. The next day, Joan is delivered flowers from "Ali Khan," with a note stating that her mother did a good job.

Don arrives home drunk and finds an angry Megan at the dinner table, furious that he didn't call to tell her where he was and that she stayed up waiting for him. Don claims that she likes to fight because it turns her on, but Megan rebuffs him and orders him to eat dinner with her. At the office, Pete informs the partners that Mohawk Airlines is suspending their advertising budget due to a machinist strike. When Lane protests cutting the bonuses entirely, the other partners agree to give bonuses only to the staff and defer their own. In the conference room, the partners inform the employees about Mohawk, Jaguar, and the bonuses, only the last of which gets a response after Roger makes it clear that the employees are getting bonuses and the partners aren't. Don ends the meeting with a rally, saying that when they obtain the Jaguar account, the world will know about SCDP. The room erupts in applause. Lane, however, is visibly uneasy as everyone files out.

== Production ==
"Christmas Waltz" was written by Victor Levin and Matthew Weiner and directed by Michael Uppendahl. Of his character, Lane Pryce, Jared Harris said that "He is learning to behave the way the others behave. Your ego and your self-esteem is wrapped up in saying 'this is my area of expertise and I'll take care of it and don't you worry about it." Jon Hamm, elaborating on Don's motivation for the ending speech, said, "What drives him to that speech is part of his gradual creative reawakening and reinvigorating and really wanting to pay penance for writing the letter, and losing Lucky Strike, and trying to come through for people.

== Reception ==
=== Critical reception ===
The episode was well-received by television journalists, with many praising the chemistry between Christina Hendricks and Jon Hamm. Emily VanDerWerff of The A.V. Club gave the episode an A− grade, adding that "'Christmas Waltz' sees the characters confronting materialism and consumerism itself, in a handful of separate plots. (Also, Lane Pryce continues to have the world's most depressing adventures.) Of course, one could argue the whole show is about people realizing that having something isn't going to make them happy. That's true, more or less, but 'Christmas Waltz' was damn direct about it at times." Tim Goodman called the episode "thoroughly entertaining" and pointed to the episode's "theme of elusive happiness", but expressed worry about how the series will wrap up several ongoing story threads involving Lane Pryce's financial woes, the Draper marriage, and the Betty Francis arc within the next three episodes. Alan Sepinwall of Hitfix praised the storylines involving Don and Joan's bond and Paul's return, but called Lane's journey the "sketchiest of the week, in the same way that his infatuation with the woman in the wallet was the one misstep in the season premiere."

=== Ratings ===
"Christmas Waltz" was watched by 1.92 million viewers and received an adult 18-49 rating of 0.6, marking the lowest numbers for the series since the third season.

=== Awards ===
"Christmas Waltz" was nominated for the Primetime Emmy Award for Outstanding Makeup for a Single-Camera Series (Non-Prosthetic).
