= Got Live If You Want It! =

Got Live If You Want It! may refer to:

- Got Live If You Want It! (album), the first live album by British rock band The Rolling Stones, released in the US in 1966
- Got Live If You Want It! (EP), the final official EP by The Rolling Stones, released in the UK in 1965
