= A Little Kiss =

- Mad Men episodes
- Episode nos.: Season 5 Episodes 1 & 2
- Directed by: Jennifer Getzinger
- Written by: Matthew Weiner
- Original air date: March 25, 2012
- Running time: 92 minutes

Guest appearances
- Mason Vale Cotton as Bobby Draper; Christine Estabrook as Gail Holloway; Peyton List as Jane Sterling; Alison Brie as Trudy Campbell; Embeth Davidtz as Rebecca Pryce; Larisa Oleynik as Cynthia Cosgrove; Charlie Hofheimer as Abe Drexler; Matt Riedy as Henry Lammott; Jack Laufer as Frank Keller; John Sloman as Raymond Geiger; Stephanie Drake as Meredith

Episode chronology
← Previous "Tomorrowland"	Next → "Tea Leaves"
- Mad Men season 5

"A Little Kiss" is the two-part fifth season premiere of the American television drama series Mad Men. Officially the first two episodes of the season and the 53rd and 54th episodes of the series, it was written by series creator and executive producer Matthew Weiner and directed by Jennifer Getzinger. It originally aired as a single episode on AMC in the United States on March 25, 2012, but appears as two separate episodes on IMDb and streaming services.

The premiere concerns on Don Draper's 40th birthday, opening on Memorial Day weekend 1966. The office prepares for Don's surprise party while also dealing with the Heinz Beans account recently brought into the agency. The relationship between Megan and Don turns bitter after she performs a sensuous dance during the party, while Peggy and Pete both suffer through professional conflict with their co-workers.

"A Little Kiss" was the first Mad Men episode to air in 17 months following heated contract negotiations between AMC and Weiner. A consequence of the hiatus saw the show switch from airing in the summer/fall to the spring for the remainder of its run. Christopher Stanley (Henry Francis), Jessica Paré (Megan Draper), and Jay R. Ferguson (Stan Rizzo) were all added as main cast members beginning with the premiere. The theme of the episode relates to the boredom and discontent among the main characters as they settle into their rather uneventful lives. The episode was well received by television critics and, at a runtime of 90 minutes, is the longest episode of Mad Men to date. It was also the highest-rated episode, with 3.54 million viewers, a substantial jump over the fourth-season average owing in large part to the lengthy time between seasons.

== Plot ==
On Memorial Day weekend in 1966, on the street below the Young & Rubicam office, African American protesters are picketing in support of equal-opportunity employment. Several employees lean out the office window and drop bags of water on them. The protesters and journalists then enter the office to catch the employees ready with water-filled bags.

At his new apartment, Don Draper (Jon Hamm) cooks breakfast for Sally (Kiernan Shipka), Bobby (Mason Vale Cotton) and Gene. He only gets to see them for a short time before he returns them to Betty and Henry's impressive (but quite old) home. Don is now married to Megan, and turning forty (Dick Whitman's birthday having been more than six months earlier and Don Draper's about to occur). The next day, Megan, who now works under Peggy Olson (Elisabeth Moss) in creative, is planning a big surprise party for his birthday. Peggy, knowing Don's aversion to birthdays, is reserved about the idea, but Megan insists that no one could dislike parties.

Roger Sterling (John Slattery) shows Don and Pete Campbell (Vincent Kartheiser) a newspaper article shaming Y&R for the water-bomb stunt. Roger suggests running a mock ad touting Sterling Cooper Draper Pryce as an equal-opportunity employer. Pete arrives at a lunch meeting with representatives from Mohawk Airlines and unexpectedly finds Roger sharing drinks with them. Roger had spied on Pete's appointment calendar. Pete is overcome with anger over Roger's antics, especially since the charismatic Roger makes a much better impression.

During a presentation for Heinz, Peggy pitches an ambitious, cutting-edge "ballet of beans" ad, which does not impress the Heinz executives. Don enters to assure the company men that his firm will think of a new pitch. Peggy protests that he did not fight hard enough for her idea, and complains to Stan that Don has changed.

On the evening of the surprise party (which is inadvertently given away by Roger), Megan presents her birthday gift, singing a French song, "Zou Bisou Bisou", and dancing provocatively. The guests clap and whistle, although Don seems unimpressed. Peggy, while talking to Don and Megan, makes a snide remark about having to return to the office later, since she is the only one really working on the weekend. After the party, Don, tired of the day, collapses on the bed fully clothed. Megan asks if he enjoyed the party; he tells her not to waste money on such things. Indifferent to his mood, she teases and kisses him, wanting to talk about the party. He declines and insists on going to sleep, so she leaves the room upset. It is also revealed that, since the time of the last episode, Don has told Megan about his real identity and past.

The next morning, Lane Pryce (Jared Harris) finds a man's wallet in a cab. Inspecting it, he becomes fascinated with a photo of a young woman named Delores. He later telephones the wallet's owner but reaches Delores, the owner's girlfriend. He flirts with her on the phone, and she promises the wallet will be retrieved. The owner of the wallet comes to Sterling Cooper Draper Pryce in order to pick it up. Lane secretly removes Delores' photo and the owner does not notice.

Joan Harris (Christina Hendricks) has given birth to a son named Kevin, who is now a few months old. Her mother, Gail Holloway (Christine Estabrook), has come to stay with her to help with the baby but constantly argues about Joan returning to work, saying that Joan's husband is a doctor. Insisting that the company needs her, Joan does not want to break her promise to go back. Gail shows Joan the company's newspaper ad and claims that it is evidence that they intend to replace her. Joan stops by the office with baby Kevin in tow. In Lane's office, she tearfully asks if they are planning to replace her. He assures her that the ad is a poor joke and that everyone is eagerly awaiting her return.

Megan overhears some particularly lewd comments from Harry about her dance, eventually ranting to Peggy about the office's cynical culture. She tells her that Don did not appreciate the surprise party. Peggy apologizes for her rude comment at the party and Megan goes home early. Peggy goes to Don's office to apologize to him as well. After hearing that Megan went home early, Don also leaves for the day. At the apartment, he asks Megan why she left work. She then disrobes and angrily cleans up the mess left from the party in just her black bra and panties. Don tries to initiate sex, but Megan says no and forcefully pushes him away several times. Don grabs her roughly, saying she "[wants] it so bad right now", and the two have sex on the floor. Afterwards, Megan complains that she is not liked at the office and wonders if she ought to stop working there. Don tells her he does not care about work, he only cares about her.

Pete is given Harry's office, which is larger and has windows to impress his clients. As revenge for Roger crashing his earlier meeting with Mohawk Airlines, Peter later tricks Roger into going on a 6:00 a.m. meeting with Coca-Cola that doesn't exist. At the office the next morning, Don and Megan enter the reception area to find a large group of African-American women and men. They are responding to the newspaper ad, not aware it was a joke. The receptionist interrupts with a piece of traditional African art, sent from Y&R. Realizing that the applicants have seen the artefact, Cooper sends Lane into the reception area. He dismisses the men, by saying they are only seeking secretaries, and collects resumes from the women.

== Production ==
"A Little Kiss" was directed by Jennifer Getzinger and written by series creator Matthew Weiner. This was the second episode to be solely written by Weiner and directed by Getzinger, the other being the fourth season episode "The Suitcase". Although the first to be aired of the season, it was actually produced after the following episode "Tea Leaves", due to January Jones' pregnancy. Despite the long break, 85 percent of the crew from the fourth season returned for the fifth. "There's a sense of boredom, there's a sense of anxiety, there's a sense of discontent with the contentedness", Weiner said, in regards to the positions of the characters at the beginning of the new season. Weiner considered the main question of the first episode "What is Don Draper like when he is happy?", with the twist of the first episode being Don's lack of interest in work. The episode was expanded from its regular runtime of 47 minutes into a 90-minute episode aired over two hours, after Weiner realized the story broken for the premiere was "85 percent too big". "We just put everything into it that we had. I think when you see it in its completeness, you'll get it."

Contract negotiations between the end of the fourth and fifth season led Matthew Weiner to quit during the downtime between Season 4 and Season 5. AMC and Weiner were negotiating, with AMC asking Weiner to cut two main cast members every season starting with the fifth, a shorter running time to make room for more commercials, and more product placement within the series. During the negotiations, Weiner said, "First of all, the number that's been published is not true. Second of all, I offered to have less money, to save the cast, and to leave the show in the running time that it's supposed to be. The harder that I've fought for the show, the more money that they've offered me." After conversations with the network stalled, Weiner gave up hope on returning to the series. "I quit ... during the negotiation. I had come to terms with the fact that it was over ... In the most protective and demanding way, I did not feel that it was worth going back to work to make a show that was not the show I'd been making. I had this argument with my wife, where I said: 'You don't understand - it's not just a matter of changing the show. I don't want to go to work and do it different. I just figured out how it works' ... [But] in the end, everything worked out." AMC eventually relented, signing a new deal with Weiner that keeps him on board as show runner for the fifth and sixth season, with a strong possibility for a final seventh season.

Weiner explained that the delay in the airing of the series and the 17-month break between the fourth and fifth season was not his decision. However, he did admit that the plan to keep Mad Men off the air in 2011 was in place before the negotiations. He said, "There was a plan in place in 2010 that the show would not be on the air in 2011. You don't just throw in Breaking Bad because Mad Men is not available. They have four shows. They do them one at a time, and God bless them for the fact that Breaking Bad got an audience, because of where they were this summer. I'm very happy about that, because people should see that show."

=== "The Look of Love" song change ===
The original screener of "A Little Kiss" sent out to critics included the use of the Dusty Springfield song "The Look of Love". Critics soon pointed out that "The Look of Love" was not released until 1967, six months after the time that "A Little Kiss" takes place. When critics pointed this out to Weiner, he sent out a letter to critics, which was reprinted in many publications and websites. Weiner's letter included him telling reporters that, "Although we take license for artistic purposes with the end-title music, we never want the source music to break from the time period we are trying to recreate. As someone who has a deep appreciation for details, I want to thank you for bringing this to our attention. It's a privilege to work on a show that generates an ongoing dialog with you and our amazing fans so please — keep those notes and comments coming!" The 1966 Dusty Springfield song "You Don't Have To Say You Love Me" was used during the end titles, though this was not a replacement for "The Look of Love". An article by The New York Times indicated that "The Look of Love" was originally played by the band at Don Draper's fortieth birthday party.

=== Young & Rubicam protest incident ===
On May 28, 1966, advertising executives from Young & Rubicam dropped water bombs on unsuspecting Black protesters, including 9-year-old Mike Robinson. This uncredited child actor portrays a fictionalized version of Robinson in the fifth-season premiere of Mad Men.

In an unusual departure for the series, the opening scene of the season premiere was largely a re-creation of a true event that occurred at the Young & Rubicam advertising agency. The original story detailing the event was published on Page 1 of the May 28, 1966, edition of The New York Times. The "Goldwater '68" poster seen in the window of Young & Rubicam during "A Little Kiss" was also present on the day of the real event, including another poster that read "If you want money, get a job" (echoed by one character's scream of "Get a job!" at the protesters in the premiere).

The incident was notable for water bombs thrown from the executive floor, which housed the Young & Rubicam advertising agency. The two water balloons struck 9-year-old Mike Robinson, and 19-year-old James Hill, who slipped and fell on pavement, but was not seriously hurt. His mother, Esme Robinson, along with other Black protesters and a New York Times reporter, came to the executive floor to complain. Mike Robinson, Esme Robinson, protester Vivian Harris, and Times reporter John Kifner were all portrayed in the opening scene. The dialogue in the scene was also taken directly from the original article. Vivian Harris originally said the, "And they call us savages" line, which television critic Mike Hale called "unfortunately hamhanded" and fellow critic Matt Zoller Seitz called "a terrible line" when they reviewed the premiere, apparently unaware that it was a quote. On the day of the real event, Young & Rubicam office manager Frank Coppola apologized to the women for the incident, saying that "we have 1,600 people in this building and I can't control all of them. I've ordered all of the windows closed and I have men patrolling all the floors to make sure this doesn't happen again." Coppola's assurance that the windows were closed is similar to character Don Draper's idea of "Our windows don't open" in Sterling Cooper Draper Pryce's mocking want ad seen later in the episode.

After the head researcher for Mad Men, Allison Hill, found the original article, she handed it to Weiner, who was "blown away". "I just loved the level of outrage from the participants in the protest. It was so eloquently said, and it struck to the heart of the conflict. They were being lampooned. This was a very serious issue for them and a joke to everyone else". The New York Times reporter, John Kifner, does not remember the event, mentioning that he did "a lot of poverty and racial stuff." He could not remember the original article, but was delighted to hear that his story inspired the premiere. The current chief executive of Young & Rubicam, David Sable, did not know whether the original employees were fired, but found their actions "completely repulsive and not in line with the values of our company".

=== "Zou Bisou Bisou" ===
Megan Draper's (Jessica Paré) performance at the birthday party

The episode includes a scene where Megan Draper serenades Don with a rendition of "Zou Bisou Bisou", which is a French Yé-yé song originally released in 1960 by Gillian Hills. Matthew Weiner prepared Jessica Paré for her performance and gave her a detailed list of notes to help her. She worked with choreographer Marianne Ann Kellogg during three six-hour sessions to work out the dance routine. It took the actress about a week and a half to learn the routine. She recorded the song in a studio. Paré said to reporters the day after the original episode airing, "It's been gathering a lot of really great attention. I can't believe I'm new on the show and one of the first things I have to do is an entire song and dance routine for the entire cast of Mad Men." Weiner called the dance a symbol of the oncoming generation gap and "open sexuality".

Alexandra Kaptik of The Wall Street Journal said "One of the most talked-about scenes...was Megan Draper's sultry performance..." Slate's Haglund described the song as "The centerpiece of the Mad Men season 5 premiere". Matthew Perpetua of Rolling Stone described the scene as "a highlight of the two-hour episode", stating that "Megan sings...for her husband, who can barely suppress his embarrassment and discomfort." Bill Keveney of USA Today said "Paré...had fans buzzing...with her character's sexy rendition..." Patrick Kevin Day of the Los Angeles Times stated that the scene "...has people talking", describing it as follows: "Pare...serenades her husband...with the sexy, slinky number "Zou Bisou Bisou" while wearing a barely there miniskirt." Lori Rackl of the Chicago Sun-Times noted that the performance was the talk the premiere and said: "Showing a lot of leg — and chutzpah — the new Mrs. Megan Draper (Jessica Paré) delivered a sexy serenade...purring the early '60s French pop song "Zou Bisou Bisou." The...performance made the unflappable Don Draper blush and his co-workers' jaws hit the floor..." Lauren Moraski of CBS News said "Probably one of the best scenes...took place when the new Mrs. Don Draper (Jessica Paré as Megan) sang an awkward-turned-sultry version of the French '60s pop song "Zou Bisou Bisou"..." Erin Carlson of The Hollywood Reporter described Paré's performance as "bizarre, come-hither burlesque", noting that she "...stunned partygoers who openly ogled her while the ad exec (Jon Hamm) squirmed with polite embarrassment." Ethan Sacks of the New York Daily News described the scene as "The sexy scene in which Megan serenades Don...with the song and transitions into a lap dance..."

== Reception ==
=== Ratings ===
"A Little Kiss" was the most watched episode of Mad Men to that point, with 3.5 million viewers and 1.6 million viewers in the 18-49 demographic. Before the fifth season, Mad Men had never got above a 1.00 in the 18-49 demographic. The premiere's core viewer demographic was adults aged 25–54 at 1.7 million viewers. This was an increase from the same core group during the season four premiere at 1.4 million viewers. Charlie Collier, AMC's president, said that "For each of the five Mad Men seasons Matthew Weiner and his team have crafted a beautifully told story and each season a larger audience has responded; a rare accomplishment. We couldn't be more proud of this program, the brilliant writers, cast and crew, and the entire team on each side of the camera."

=== Critical reception ===
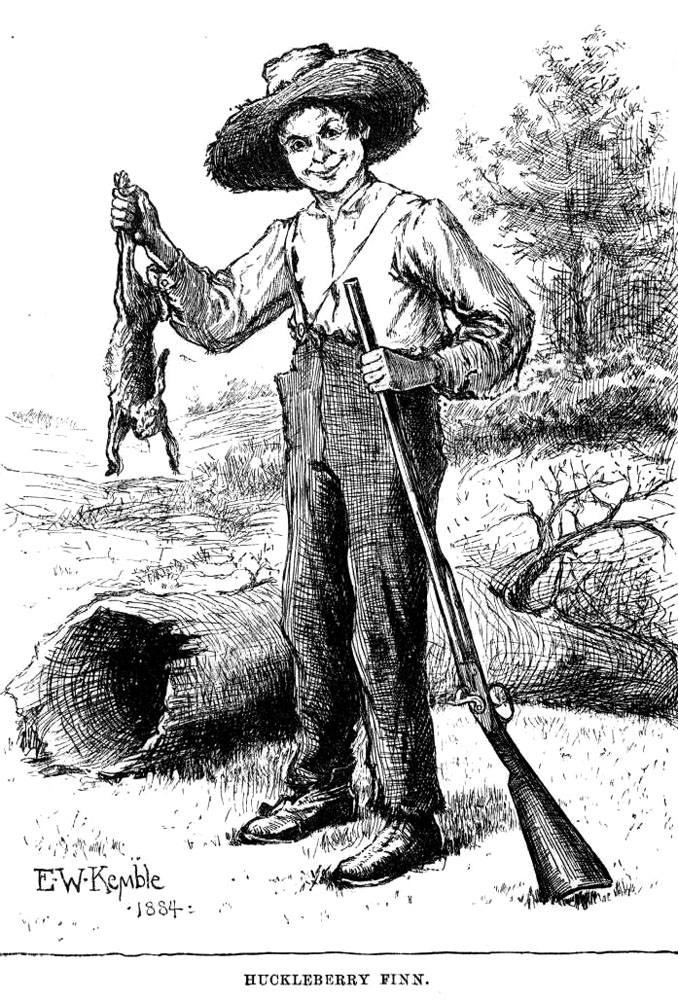
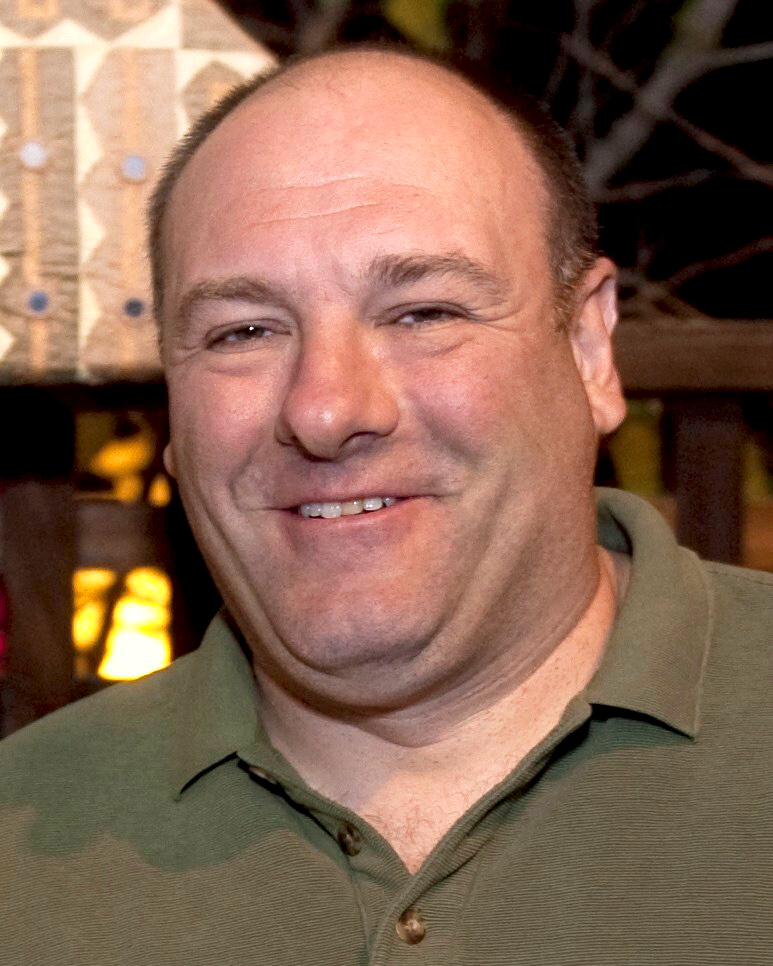
One reviewer compared the character of Don Draper to American characters like Huckleberry Finn and Tony Soprano (played by James Gandolfini, pictured right)

"A Little Kiss" received very approving reviews from the television critic community. USA Today writer Robert Bianco gave it four out of four stars, praising the high level of achievement in the writing and directing as well as the cast led by the "shockingly under-Emmyed Jon Hamm, playing a man who is his own deeply flawed invention and letting us see the effort and pain behind the charade. But there's not a weak performer on view Sunday, from the preternaturally assured Kiernan Shipka as Sally to old pro Robert Morse as Bert." TV Guide critic Matt Roush opined that "the civil rights movement provides ironic bookends for the episode, reflecting how insular the universe is for these smug but deeply flawed purveyors of the American dream, none more memorable and maddening than Don Draper (Jon Hamm), the alpha hunk who appears to have it all. But some things never change in the world of Mad Men: the high quality of acting, writing, production design and detail." Newsday reviewer Verne Gay gave it an "A" grade, citing that "Mad Men is back and back in all the right ways -- the humor, the writing, the period details, and best of all, the flawless attention to these characters and their cluttered interior worlds." Alan Sepinwall of HitFix said that "the premiere suggests that the only other show that belongs with it in the discussion for the best drama on television is the same one we were talking about last season. At the top level, there is Breaking Bad, and there is also — finally, thankfully, exceptionally — Mad Men, and then there is everything else."

TV Fanatic's Dan Forcella gave the two-hour season premiere 4.5 out of 5 stars by saying, "Honestly, the first 45 minutes or so were basically just setting the scene for the new season, so it was a smart move to make this premiere two hours long. After that, though, everything began to pick up." Emily St. James of The A.V. Club rated this episode an A− and commented on the series' take on the 1960s, saying: "The '60s are both incredibly important to the show and something almost incidental to what makes it work so well. It's a show, on the one hand, about how people deal with sweeping social change, even when it's happening way, way off their radar (as we see in the final scene of tonight's episode), but it's also a show about what it means to live through a decade." Lori Rackl of Chicago Sun-Times gave the season five premiere four stars: "After a dark and often depressing season four, it's refreshing to start things off on a more jovial, lighter note. That's not to say the premiere is devoid of angst, disappointment and drama. It's just buoyed by an unusually high amount of humor." The Los Angeles Times' Robert Lloyd spoke about the series' continued success: "It works because it's less about who we were then—it's a fantasy of who we were then, really—than about who we are now."

Alessandra Stanley of The New York Times, however, was one of the very few reviewers to give the season premiere a low score: "A show that became a hit because it seemed so original has been so co-opted that it now looks like a cliché. The personalities on Mad Men don't change, but the times do. At this point, the context may be more interesting than the characters." On Twitter, The Hollywood Reporter critic Tim Goodman characterized Stanley's critique as a "bullshit ramble-review", saying that Stanley "just wants us to know she's above the material she's covering." In his review, Goodman was laudatory, saying that "the party, more than anything else, was a central defining moment of where we're going. Everything about it was different. Newer. We're not in 1960 anymore. And if you think about it, the show we all know and love is about to change as well. It's going to look different, above and beyond the characters changing." Time writer James Poniewozik wrote a cooler review saying that, "I'm glad to have Mad Men back, but "A Little Kiss" was not a great episode. Mad Men return episodes generally aren't: they take their time and do a lot of table setting." Poniewozik was simultaneously intrigued and unsettled by Megan's addition as "essentially a new female lead" and reasoned that Weiner used Megan's "unfamiliarity as an advantage and as a storytelling device. The very fact that she is an unknown quantity among these very well-known quantities may give us a chance to see everyone we think we know differently — through the eyes of a relative stranger." Chuck Barney of the Contra Costa Times said the premiere was off to a "methodical start" that reintroduced us to the "enigmatic characters" but that "Eventually, it gains traction, weaving threads of heartfelt poignancy with doses of dark humor. What hasn't changed is the quality of the endeavor. Mad Men remains a show that often feels more like literature than TV. The top-notch acting is still intact, as is the attention to aesthetic detail. So, after that excruciating delay, are we still in love with this show? Truly, deeply -- madly." David Weigard of the San Francisco Chronicle called the premiere a "stunner" and compared the character of Don Draper to legendary American characters like Jake Barnes, Charles Foster Kane, Tony Soprano, Huck Finn, Natty Bumppo, Elmer Gantry and "most of all, to F. Scott Fitzgerald's creation of Jimmy Gatz, who assumed an entirely new identity as Jay Gatsby in 1925."
