= Beat Girl =

1960 British film by Edmond T. Gréville

- UK film poster
- Directed by: Edmond T. Gréville
- Screenplay by: Dail Ambler
- Produced by: George Willoughby
- Starring: David Farrar; Noëlle Adam; Christopher Lee; Adam Faith; Gillian Hills
- Cinematography: Walter Lassally
- Edited by: Gordon Pilkington
- Music by: John Barry; Lyrics by: Trevor Peacock; Hyam Maccoby
- Production company: Willoughby Film Productions
- Distributed by: Renown Pictures
- Release date: 28 October 1960
- Running time: 87 minutes
- Country: United Kingdom
- Language: English
- Budget: £79,840

Beat Girl is a 1960 British teen exploitation drama film directed by Edmond T. Gréville. The film was released in the United States under the title Wild for Kicks.

The title character of Beat Girl was played by starlet Gillian Hills, who later went on to have numerous small roles in 1960s and 1970s films, such as Blowup (1966) and A Clockwork Orange (1971), and became a successful yé-yé singer in France. Beat Girl marked the first film roles of British pop idol Adam Faith and actor Peter McEnery, although it was not released until after other films featuring Faith (Never Let Go (1960)) and McEnery (Tunes of Glory (1960)) had already come out. The film also features Christopher Lee and Nigel Green as strip joint operators, and Oliver Reed in a small role as one of the "beat" youth.

The original music was composer John Barry's first film commission, and was performed by the John Barry Seven and Orchestra, Adam Faith, and Shirley Anne Field. The Beat Girl soundtrack was the first British soundtrack to be released on a vinyl LP. It reached number 11 on the UK Albums Chart, paving the way for the release of other film soundtrack albums.

== Plot ==
Paul Linden, a wealthy, middle-aged architect, returns home to Kensington, London. Previously divorced, he brings his new wife, 24-year-old Nichole, whom he has just married in Paris. Paul's teenage daughter, Jennifer, is resentful of his remarriage and rejects Nichole's friendly overtures. After Paul and Nichole go to bed, Jennifer sneaks out to the Off-Beat café in Soho for an evening of rock music and dancing with her friends.

The next day Nichole plans to meet Jennifer at Saint Martin's School of Art, where the latter studies, so they can have lunch together. At lunchtime Nichole arrives at St Martin's but learns that Jennifer has gone to the Off-Beat. There Nicole confronts Jennifer in front of her friends and reminds her to be home for Paul's important business dinner that night. While leaving, Nichole passes Greta, the star performer at the strip club across the street. Greta recognises Nichole and greets her by name. However Nichole ignores her. Jennifer suspects that Nichole was also a stripper before meeting Paul.

At Paul's business dinner Jennifer tries to embarrass Nichole in front of the guests by bringing up the encounter with the stripper. After the guests leave Paul questions Nichole, who says that she knew Greta in Paris and that they were in ballet together but Greta pursued a different way of life and Nichole lost track of her. Paul accepts her explanation but Jennifer goes to the strip club to ask Greta direct. Greta initially claims that she made a mistake and does not know Nichole, but under pressure from her boyfriend, strip club manager Kenny King, she reveals that she and Nichole worked together as strippers and occasional prostitutes in Paris. Jennifer, encouraged by Kenny, becomes enamoured with the idea of becoming a stripper herself. Jennifer is caught by Paul and Nichole coming home from the strip club late at night and a confrontation ensues. Jennifer reveals that she has spoken to Greta and threatens to tell Paul what she has learned if Nichole does not stay out of her life. At the strip club Nicole tells Kenny and Greta to stay away from Jennifer. Kenny says that Jennifer will be welcome there any time and that if Nichole interferes he will tell Paul about her past.

That night Jennifer and her friends dance at Chislehurst Caves and participate in a car race and a game of chicken on railway tracks, where the last person to leave the rails before the train arrives (Jennifer) wins. Jennifer invites everyone to continue the party at her house, since Paul is out of town and Nichole presumably will not interfere. Jennifer accepts a dare to "strip like a Frenchie" and begins a striptease to music, but when she gets down to her underwear Nichole bursts from her bedroom and stops her. Then Paul arrives home and breaks up the party, throwing all of the beatniks out of his house. Jennifer angrily tells Paul about Nichole's activities in Paris. Nichole, crying, admits that it is true and explains that she only did it because she was broke and hungry. Paul and Nichole profess their love for each other and reconcile.

Jennifer goes to the café but now finds it boring. She walks out on her friends and meets Kenny at the strip club. Kenny invites her to go to Paris with him, where he can train her to be a star stripper. Greta later learns that Kenny plans to leave her and go off with Jennifer. As Kenny makes a pass at Jennifer, someone stabs him to death. The club staff, thinking Jennifer has killed Kenny, lock her in a room and call the police. Jennifer screams that she did not do it and the real culprit, Greta, emerges from behind a curtain. Meanwhile Teddy Boys vandalise the car of Tony (one of Jennifer's friends) and smash the guitar of Dave (another of Jennifer's friends), initiating a confrontation between the two groups. Paul and Nichole arrive searching for Jennifer while the police drag her out of the strip club. The police release Jennifer to Paul and Nichole and they return home, arms around one another, as Dave throws his broken guitar in the rubbish.

== Cast ==
- Gillian Hills as Jennifer Linden
- Adam Faith as Dave
- David Farrar as Paul Linden
- Noëlle Adam as Nichole Linden
- Christopher Lee as Kenny King
- Shirley Anne Field as Dodo
- Peter McEnery as Tony
- Claire Gordon as Honey
- Oliver Reed as Plaid Shirt
- Michael Kayne as Duffle Coat
- Anthony Singleton as Green Pants
- Robert Raglan as F.O. official
- Nade Beall as official's wife
- Margot Bryant as Martha
- Nigel Green as Simon
- Norman Mitchell as club doorman
- Pascaline as exotic strip dancer
- Delphi Lawrence (uncredited) as Greta
- Carol White (uncredited) as Off-Beat girl
- Diane D'Orsay (uncredited) as strip dancer in white négligée

== Production ==
=== Filming ===
George Minter, who ran Renown Pictures, said he wanted to make a picture "for the kids".

Gillian Hills had been discovered by Roger Vadim, who considered casting her in Les liaisons dangereuses. He elected not to do so, and Hills made her film debut in this movie instead.

Filming started 27 July 1959. The movie was filmed at MGM-British Studios at Borehamwood, Hertfordshire, UK, with exteriors filmed in Soho and Chislehurst Caves (then in Kent).

Pascaline, the Haitian exotic dancer who appears in a sequence performing with a scarf, had performed in real life as an exotic dancer at the Crazy Horse Saloon in Paris.

=== Music ===
After Adam Faith was cast, John Barry was asked to compose the film soundtrack, because he had already been collaborating with Faith as an arranger.

Barry was subsequently hired to score Faith's next films, Never Let Go (1960) and Mix Me a Person (1962), leading to Barry's successful career as a composer and arranger of film music.

In addition to the Beat Girl soundtrack LP reaching number 11 in the album charts, the song "Made You," composed by John Barry and Trevor Peacock and performed in the film by Faith, achieved minor hit status before being banned by the BBC for suggestive lyrics. A sample from the title track is used in "The Rockafeller Skank," a 1998 single by Fatboy Slim, for which Barry receives a co-writer credit.

== Release ==
Some versions of the released film have cut the original striptease sequences (which included topless nudity), some exposition scenes set in the strip club, the "chicken" game scene, and/or some opening exposition scenes with David Farrar and Noëlle Adam on a train and then with Gillian Hills at their London home.

=== Censorship ===
When the original script, entitled "Striptease Girl," was submitted to the British Board of Film Censors in March 1959, the reviewer termed it "machine-made dirt" and "the worst script I have read for some years". The project was then renamed "Beat Girl" and nudity was reduced, but censors still objected to scenes of strip tease, juvenile delinquency, and teenagers playing "chicken" by lying on railway tracks in front of an oncoming train. Ultimately, the film received an "X" certificate, causing its release to be delayed because it was queued behind a glut of other X-rated films.

=== Critical reception ===
The film was bought for distribution by Victoria Films and did "exceptionally well" playing over 1,000 theatres, despite receiving bad reviews.

Kine Weekly wrote: "JEAN-AGE melodrama, with songs. Set mainly in Soho, it's about a self-willed fifteen-year-old beatnik daughter of a successful architect, who resents her father's pretty French second wife and decides to live for kicks, but soon gets into hot water and, chastened, returns lo the old nest. The tale is not particularly original, but the principal adults' and teenagers' performances are first-class, the list of ”cool” guest artists stretches as long as your arm, and the numbers head the current hit parade. And that's not all. the film's musical score, played by topnotch John Barry and his Orchestra and sung by Shirley Ann Field and Adam Faith, is the first to be recorded in its entirety on a long-playing disc. Pre-sold, the opus can hardly miss. Outstanding British gimmick offering"

Variety said: "Cheap little dualer about a London kid who gets mixed up with beatniks, striptease, murder and problems with her father and stepmother; may click with undiscriminating audiences."

Leslie Halliwell called the film a "Risible exposé-style melodrama."

The Radio Times Guide to Films gave the film 2/5 stars, writing: "[this] failed attempt to launch Adam Faith as yet another of Britain's answers to Elvis Presley is now a great pop history lesson in teenage attitudes and rock 'n' roll rebellion, complete with cool jive talk and swinging sounds."

Sight and Sound said: "Beat Girl evidently has one eye on US product such as Rebel Without a Cause, offering a largely studio set, mock ethnographic survey of the new teenage tribe frequenting Soho coffee bars and basement clubs, playing chicken on country roads and talking in a brand new argot (“Straight from the fridge, dad!"), which screenwriter Dail Ambler quite possibly made up for the occasion. It's a film as flummoxed as super-square patriarch David Farrar's permanently creased brow, which perhaps explains why the producers hedged their bets by situating a striptease show across the street from the kids' espresso stop, allowing extensive onstage footage to be tailored for various export versions. ... Like so much British cinema of the time, It's a muddled yet fascinating affair, which somehow manages to look to the future in spite of itself."
