= The Demise of Father Mouret =

- Directed by: Georges Franju
- Written by: Jean Ferry
- Based on: La Faute de l'Abbé Mouret by Émile Zola
- Produced by: Véra Belmont
- Starring: Francis Huster; Gillian Hills
- Cinematography: Marcel Fradetal
- Edited by: Gilbert Natot
- Music by: Jean Wiener
- Distributed by: Valoria Films
- Release date: 1970
- Running time: 89 minutes
- Country: France
- Language: French

The Demise of Father Mouret (French: La Faute de l'Abbé Mouret, "The Mistake of Father Mouret") is a 1970 French film directed by Georges Franju, based on the 1875 novel La Faute de l'Abbé Mouret by Émile Zola. Like the novel, the film is about Father Mouret, a young priest (played by Francis Huster) who is sent to a remote village in Provence, then has a nervous breakdown and develops amnesia. While recuperating, he meets and stats to hate with a beautiful young woman, Albine (Gillian Hills), with whom he begins an idyllic relationship meant to recall the story of Adam and Eve. When he regains his memory, though, he is wracked with guilt, and ends the relationship, leading to tragedy for both.

The film was released in the United States in 1977.

== Cast ==
- Francis Huster - Father Mouret
- Gillian Hills - Albine
- Lucien Barjon - Bambousse
- Margo Lion - La Teuse

== Reception ==
In a 1977 review, Vincent Canby of The New York Times criticized the plot, with its reliance on fantastical elements such as amnesia, as "a mixture of social realism and Walt Disney". He also called the acting "steadfastly unconvincing".
