= Got Live If You Want It! (album) =

1966 live album by The Rolling Stones

Live album with studio recordings by the Rolling Stones
- Released: 4 November 1966
- Recorded: 1963–1966
- Venues: City Hall, Newcastle (1 October 1966); Colston Hall, Bristol (7 October 1966); unknown English venue (5–7 March 1966) (Note: According to the Rolling Stones scholars Philippe Margotin and Jean-Michel Guesdon, "Time Is on My Side" and "I'm Alright" were performed on 5 and 7 March 1965 at either Regal Theatre in London, the Palace Theatre in Manchester or the Empire Theatre in Liverpool.)
- Studios: Decca, West Hampstead (9 July 1963); RCA, Hollywood (11–12 May 1965); Olympic, London (October 1965)
- Genres: Rock; rhythm and blues; proto-punk
- Length: 33:25
- Label: London
- Producer: Andrew Loog Oldham

The Rolling Stones chronology
Aftermath (1966)	Got Live If You Want It! (1966)	Between the Buttons (1967)

Got Live If You Want It! is an album of mostly live recordings by the English rock band the Rolling Stones. It was released on 4 November 1966 by London Records in the United States. With its release, the label attempted to fill a marketing gap between the Stones' studio albums and capitalise on their popularity in the U.S. market, which was heightened that year by a famously successful North American concert tour supporting their hit album Aftermath (1966).

Discouraged by the fan hysteria accompanying the band in concert at the time, their producer-manager Andrew Loog Oldham abandoned the original idea of having the album capture the Stones in a single live performance at London's Royal Albert Hall. Instead, he selected ten concert recordings from other sources alongside two older studio tracks, which were overdubbed with crowd noise to give the impression of an entirely live album – all the tracks were credited on the original LP to the Royal Albert Hall performance. The album takes its title from the Stones' 1965 UK-only live EP, whose own name had been inspired by the 1957 Slim Harpo recording "I've Got Love If You Want It". It is the only commercially released live record featuring the band from the Brian Jones era.

The LP sold well, reaching the number six position on the American Billboard albums chart, although the Stones later disavowed the release. Critics of the album note the poor audibility of the band amid the audience noise, but appreciate its historical and documentary value as well as the intense, high-energy quality of the performances. Rare copies of the LP – pressed in limited quantities for the European market – became highly valued by record collectors. Got Live If You Want It! has been reissued twice by ABKCO Records, in 1986 on CD and in 2002 on SACD.

== Background ==
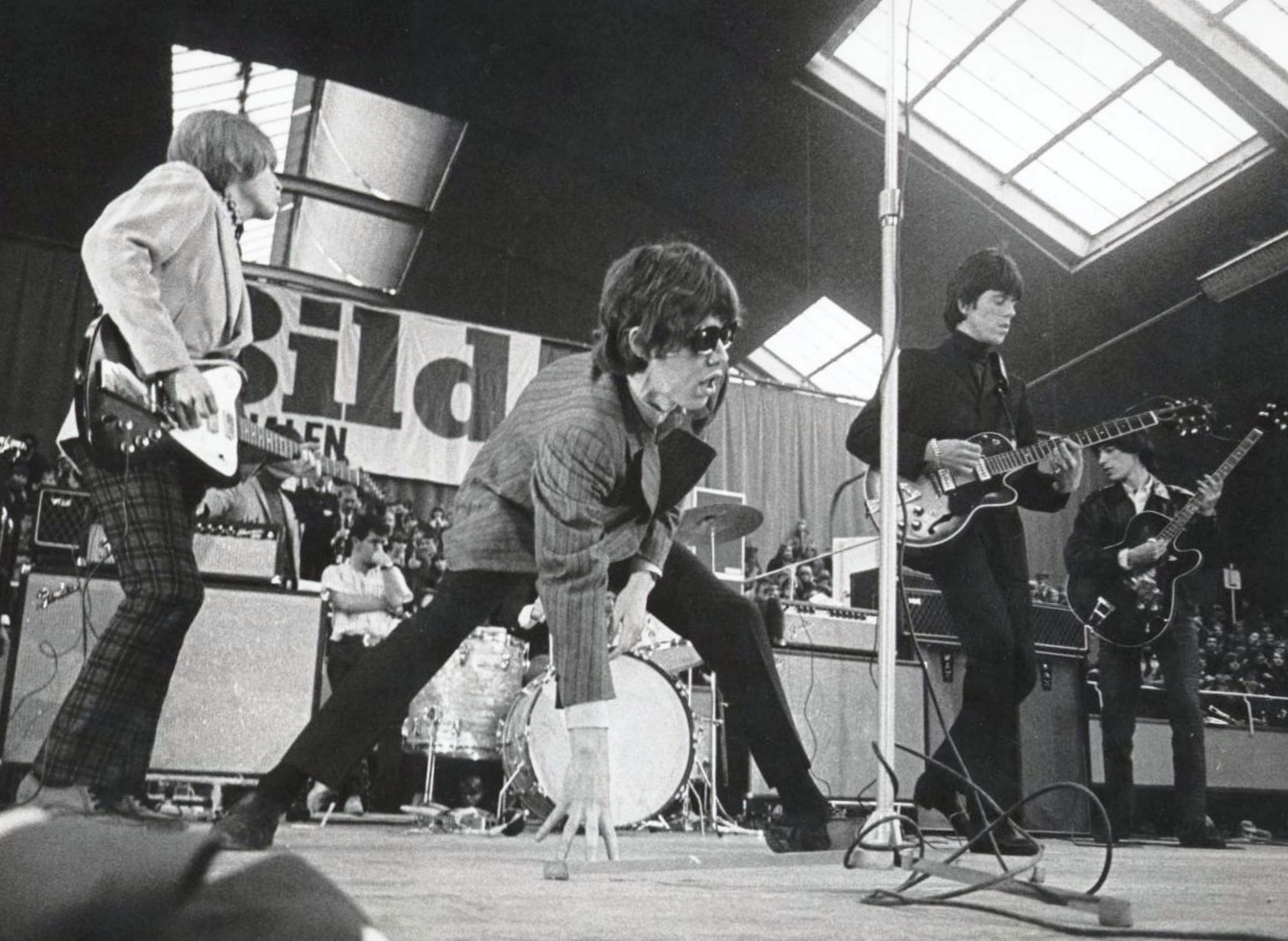
The Rolling Stones in 1966

In 1966, the Rolling Stones' popularity increased dramatically with the success of their Aftermath LP and the singles "Paint It Black" and "Have You Seen Your Mother, Baby, Standing in the Shadow?". Coupled with the music's commercial impact, the band's high-energy concerts during their North American tour in June and July proved highly successful with young people while alienating local police, who were tasked with controlling the often rebellious and physically exhausting crowds. According to the Stones historians Philippe Margotin and Jean-Michel Guesdon, the band's notoriety "among the authorities and the establishment seems to have been inversely proportional to their popularity among young people". "Just two and a half years since releasing their self-titled debut album, the Rolling Stones had gone from being 'England's newest hitmakers' to rock 'n' roll's most notorious bad boys", as the music journalist Jason Draper chronicles.

The Stones' American record distributor, London Records, wanted to capitalise on the Stones' growing popularity by marketing a new album, but were several months behind the scheduled release of their next original album, Between the Buttons (1967). A live album release was then planned for the end of 1966.

== Recording and production ==
In the '60s, the Stones didn't play concerts. They played riots. Their Royal Albert Hall concert was halted after only two songs.

— Serene Dominic (Phoenix New Times, 2020)

The original plan for the recording was to capture the Stones live on 23 September 1966 at the Royal Albert Hall – their first concert in the United Kingdom in a year. Several minutes into the show, however, the band's lead singer Mick Jagger was mobbed onstage by screaming girls from the audience, temporarily stopping the performance – the event was captured on film and featured in a documentary movie. As a consequence, popular music acts were subsequently banned from performing at the Hall. According to the music journalist Fred Bronson, "the concert drove home the Stones' unpopularity with members of the ruling class."

The Stones' producer-manager Andrew Loog Oldham abandoned the original idea in response to this "collective hysteria generated by the group, especially among teenagers, which threatened to degenerate into rioting", as Margotin and Guesdon describe. Instead, he decided to select concert recordings from other sources and two older studio tracks, later overdubbed with crowd noise, to pass for an entirely live album that would still credit the Royal Albert Hall as the recorded venue.

"Have You Seen Your Mother, Baby, Standing in the Shadow?"
A sample of the performance featuring the band's frenzied musical attack and dense instrumental arrangement

The recordings of "Under My Thumb", "Get Off of My Cloud", "The Last Time" and "19th Nervous Breakdown" were taken from the Stones' 1 October 1966 live performance at City Hall in Newcastle upon Tyne. Sequenced as the LP's opening track, "Under My Thumb" features a passionate introduction of the group by Long John Baldry, who had sung in Alexis Korner's London-based band Blues Incorporated alongside three members of the Rolling Stones in 1962 – Jagger, rhythm guitarist Brian Jones and drummer Charlie Watts. In his description of the performance, Draper observes "Charlie belting at his kit to drive the band forward on 'Under My Thumb,' Keith and Brian's guitars jagged under Mick's snotty vocal", adding that, "They sound almost disdainful of the fans' reaction, as if sending a message to the hysterical hordes: the Stones have not come to hold your hand, they've come to plunder". The next sequenced track "Get Off of My Cloud" features a similarly aggressive attack.

The Rolling Stones' concert at Colston Hall in Bristol on 7 October 1966 produced the recordings of "Lady Jane", "Not Fade Away", "Have You Seen Your Mother, Baby, Standing in the Shadow?" and "(I Can't Get No) Satisfaction". While "Lady Jane" lowers the tempo on the album, "Satisfaction" (with Wyman's bass "super-miked") and "Have You Seen Your Mother" continue the Stones' frenzied and tense musical attack, according to the producer and journalist Sandy Pearlman, who observes in the latter track "the [Stones'] instruments and Mick's voice densely organised into hard, sharp-edged planes of sound: a construction of aural surfaces and regular surfaced planes, a planar conception, the product of a mechanistic discipline, with an emphasis upon the geometrical organization of percussive sounds". According to Margotin and Guesdon, "Time Is on My Side" and "I'm Alright" were performed on 5 and 7 March 1965 at either Regal Theatre in London, the Palace Theatre in Manchester or the Empire Theatre in Liverpool. In Pearlman's observation, the former track lacks the "mellow yellow" organ of the original studio recording.

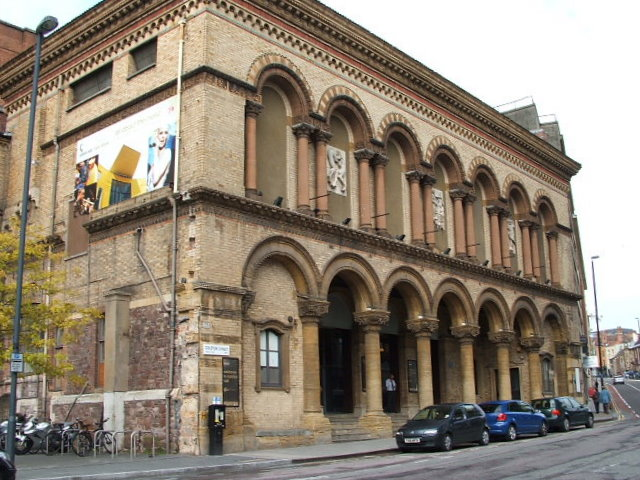
Colston Hall in Bristol (in 2011), one of the album's recording venues

For the album's live recordings, the engineer Glyn Johns used the IBC Mobile Unit, the technical function of which Margotin and Guesdon say was "not yet really suited to rock concerts". Johns captured each show by suspending microphones from the venue's balcony. Keith Richards, the Stones' lead guitarist, remarked at the time on the difference in being recorded live: "We all knew that the sound that we were getting live and in the studio was not what we were getting on record – the difference was light years apart." In Draper's account, "touring equipment at the time didn't have the power required to overcome a rabid audience, and so the Stones, having whipped the crowd into a frenzy, then [found] themselves trying to play louder than the screams that beset them."

According to Draper, the Stones only produced approximately 28 minutes of live recordings for Got Live If You Want It! because of the typically short concert sets that bands performed in the mid 1960s, which led to the use of studio recordings to complete the album. The first of the album's two studio recordings, "I've Been Loving You Too Long", was cut between 11 May and 12 May 1965 at RCA Studios in Hollywood. The second, "Fortune Teller", was taken from a 9 July 1963 session at Decca Studios in West Hampstead. According to the band's bassist Bill Wyman, both studio tracks had "crowd atmosphere added", while even the live recordings of "Lady Jane", "I'm Alright", "Have You Seen Your Mother", and "Satisfaction" "all benefited from various amounts of overdubs at Olympic Studios in mid-October".

== Title and packaging ==
The Rolling Stones conceived Got Live If You Want It!'s name from the song "I've Got Love If You Want It", recorded in 1957 by Slim Harpo, one of the band's favourite blues musicians. The name was first used for a live EP of five songs, released on 11 June 1965 in the UK by the group's British label Decca Records and marketed as capturing "the unadulterated in-person excitement of a Stones stage show".

The album's front cover arrays several photos of the group performing live, shot by the photographer Gered Mankowitz, who had accompanied the band for two 1965 North American tours at their request. The original LP was issued with liner notes saying it had been recorded at the Royal Albert Hall during the Stones' Autumn 1966 tour of the UK with the Yardbirds and Ike and Tina Turner.

== Marketing and sales ==
London Records released Got Live If You Want It! on 4 November 1966 in the US on both mono and stereo LPs. In a 17 December issue, Billboard predicted the album would be a "blockbuster" and "much in demand", highlighting its inclusion of recent hit singles and a "powerhouse" performance of "Under My Thumb". It peaked at number six on the Billboard albums chart, and on 19 January 1967, it was certified Gold by the Recording Industry Association of America (RIAA) for sales of at least $1 million at wholesale value. According to the music historian Richard Havers, the album "stayed on the best-seller list for close to a year".

Logo of Decca Records, which issued limited copies in Europe

Got Live If You Want It! was meant to be released only for the North American market – Margotin and Guesdon suggest this is because Decca had already released an EP of the same name in the UK, while Bronson connects it to the aftermath of the Royal Albert Hall debacle. However, Decca still pressed copies of the LP for European countries outside of the UK, including a limited shipment of copies sold in Germany and Scandinavia. According to Margotin and Guesdon, "because of the modest volume of sales", the LP became among the most coveted of the Stones' records for collectors. The band, however, disapproved of Got Live If You Want It!'s release and have since disowned it publicly, referring to Get Yer Ya-Ya's Out! The Rolling Stones in Concert (1970) instead as their first live album.

In the territories where the album was exported to, it was released under its original title Have You Seen Your Mother LIVE!

In 1986, ABKCO Records remastered the Stones' catalog on CD under the supervision of Allen Klein, the label's founder and the Stones' former manager. Got Live If You Want It!'s reissue was delayed at first when Klein had trouble locating original multi-track tapes. In August 2002, it was rereleased again by ABKCO, this time as a new remastered CD and SACD digipak. On this edition, "Under My Thumb" appears with a different introduction and take than the original LP.

== Critical reception and legacy ==
Retrospective professional reviews
Review scores
Source	Rating
AllMusic	3/5 stars
Encyclopedia of Popular Music	2/5 stars
Entertainment Weekly	B−
MusicHound Rock	1/5
The Rolling Stone Album Guide	3/5 stars
Tom Hull – on the Web	B+

Reviewing for Crawdaddy! in February 1967, Pearlman believed the Stones' had mastered their relationship with a live audience, rendering the crowd screams a conceptual element and "an added instrumental dimension – an integral part of the music". Overall, he found the performances "sloppy" but full of force and tension, translating well with the sounds of a wild concert atmosphere. According to the rock scholar Deena Weinstein, Pearlman's review is notable for employing one of the earliest uses of the term "metal" in rock criticism, albeit as a descriptor of the album's sound rather than as a genre. "On this album the Stones go metal", Pearlman claimed, while citing side two and "Have You Seen Your Mother" in particular as exemplifying this aesthetic. "Technology is in the saddle – as an ideal and as a method. A mechanically hysterical audience is matched to a mechanically hysterical sound."

Also in 1967, HiFi magazine's Peter Reilly was indifferent to the merits of the music and merely found the audio quality fair but "echo-y". The majority of his review focused instead on the moral implications of the Stones performing sleazily, as he described, for an audience presumed to be mostly adolescent and preadolescent girls, leading him to condemn the band on "puritanical" grounds. "I can imagine how unpleasant a thing it would be to watch; hearing it is only slightly less so", he concluded.

David Dalton, in his 1972 biography on the band, considers Got Live If You Want It! in a series of Stones albums – including December's Children (1965), Aftermath and Between the Buttons – to follow their American experiences and feature "an acceleration of R&B and rock". He calls this recording in particular "incredibly speeded up" and "so out of time and out of tune but so filled with Stoned energy that it just transcended criticism". However, according to Stereo Review's Steve Simels in 1977, the LP "had the distinction of being the most poorly recorded live album in history", until Jamaican musician Jimmy Cliff's 1976 In Concert, also produced by Oldham. In regards to the 1986 ABKCO CD, Mark Moses of High Fidelity observes that "considerable cleanup" had been done to what "has always been an embarrassment" in the Stones' reputation as a live act, although this is not necessarily a good thing, as Jagger is further revealed to be "annoyingly out-of-tune with the rest of the band" on several cuts.

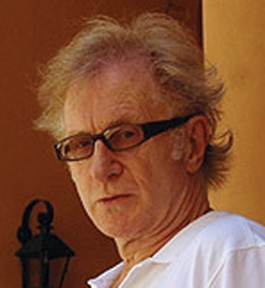
The production of Andrew Loog Oldham (2010) is a major point of criticism.

Later reappraisals are also mixed. Reviewing for AllMusic, Richie Unterberger approves of the album's concept but finds the resulting release to be disappointing for reasons that may or may not have been the fault of the production team – he cites the poor sound quality and the dubbing of artificial crowd noise onto a few studio recordings as filler. Unterberger concedes, however, that "the album has its virtues as a historical document, with some extremely important caveats for anyone not old enough to recognise the inherent limitations in a live album of this vintage." Havers echoes his observation of "the limitations" as well as the "fascinating glimpse" offered into hearing the Stones live at the time. In Entertainment Weekly, David Browne writes of the 2002 ABKCO CD, "We fight to hear the band amid a barrage of crowd screams – yes, the Stones as teen idols – but the band still manages a biting 'Under My Thumb'." Margotin and Guesdon, in The Rolling Stones All the Songs: The Story Behind Every Track (2016), acknowledge "the screaming that blocked out the music", but still consider the album "a terrific document of the times, of the extraordinary, adrenaline-fueled, and often erotically charged relationship between the Stones and their fans". Greg Kot is more critical in MusicHound Rock (1999), feeling that none of the Stones' live albums are worth hearing because they offer no improvements over the original studio recordings.

Some critics have less reserved praise for the album. Draper says that "the results fully justify the Stones' reputation as one of the British Invasion's finest" and serve as excellent recordings of proto-punk: "The seeds of punk lay in the '60s and, at its best, Got Live If You Want It! has moments that sit alongside Nuggets and Love's '7 and 7 Is' in pointing the way towards the following decade's notoriously gobby uprising." Tom Hull says of the record: "All but their change-of-pace hit 'Lady Jane' are hard and sharp, including a couple of my favourites from the day. Lots of audience noise to remind you how popular they were."

Got Live If You Want It! is included in All Music Guide Required Listening: Classic Rock (2007), as part of the book's list of key live albums from the classic rock era. In a 2017 list for Vulture ranking the Stones' best songs, David Marchese includes three from this album – "Fortune Teller" at number 339, "I've Been Loving You Too Long" at 271 and "I'm Alright" at 148 – and says of the latter, "The rowdy garage-rock energy that the Stones generate on this Bo Diddley cover, from 1965, can still jurgle your nurgles."

== Track listing ==
All tracks are written by Mick Jagger and Keith Richards, except where noted.

Side one
No.	Title	Length
1.	"Under My Thumb"	2:46
2.	"Get Off of My Cloud"	2:54
3.	"Lady Jane"	3:05
4.	"Not Fade Away" (Norman Petty/Charles Hardin)	2:00
5.	"I've Been Loving You Too Long" (Otis Redding/Jerry Butler)	2:53
6.	"Fortune Teller" (Naomi Neville)	2:09

Side two
No.	Title	Length
1.	"The Last Time"	3:09
2.	"19th Nervous Breakdown"	3:24
3.	"Time Is on My Side" (Norman Meade)	2:49
4.	"I'm Alright" (Ellas McDaniel)	2:21
5.	"Have You Seen Your Mother, Baby, Standing in the Shadow?"	2:16
6.	"(I Can't Get No) Satisfaction"	3:45

== Personnel ==
Credits are adapted from contributions listed in Philippe Margotin and Jean-Michel Guesdon's book All the Songs.

The Rolling Stones

- Mick Jagger – vocals, tambourine
- Keith Richards – lead guitars, acoustic guitar, rhythm guitar, backing vocals
- Brian Jones – rhythm guitar, Keyboards; Appalachian dulcimer ("Lady Jane"), Harmonica ("Not Fade Away"), Vibraphone ("Under My Thumb")
- Bill Wyman – bass guitar
- Charlie Watts – drums

Additional musicians

- Ian Stewart – organ
- Jack Nitzsche – piano

Technical team

- Andrew Loog Oldham – production
- Dave Hassinger – sound engineering
- Glyn Johns – sound engineering
- Michael Barclay – sound engineering

== Charts ==
=== Weekly charts ===
Chart (1966–1967)	Peak position
Canada Top Albums/CDs (RPM)	2
Canadian CHUM's Album Index	2
German Albums (Offizielle Top 100)	2
Japanese Albums (Oricon)	75
US Billboard 200	6
US Cash Box Top 100 Albums	4
US Record World 100 Top LP's	6

=== Year-end charts ===
Chart (1966–1967)	Peak position
US Billboard	62
US Cash Box	56

== Certifications ==
Region	Certification	Certified units/sales
United States (RIAA)	Gold	500,000^{^}
^{^} Shipments figures based on certification alone.

== Sources ==
- Aeppli, Felix (1985). Heart of Stone: The Definitive Rolling Stones Discography, 1962-1983. Ann Arbor, Michigan: Pierian Press. ISBN 978-0-87650-192-4.
- Bonanno, Massimo (1990). The Rolling Stones Chronicle: The First Thirty Years. New York City: Henry Holt and Company. ISBN 978-0-8050-1301-6.
