= Tea Leaves (Mad Men) =

- Mad Men episode
- January Jones as Betty Francis eating a sundae in the final scene of 'Tea Leaves." The writers wrote around Jones's real-life pregnancy by including a weight gain for the character.
- Episode no.: Season 5 Episode 3
- Directed by: Jon Hamm
- Written by: Erin Levy; Matthew Weiner
- Original air date: April 1, 2012
- Running time: 48 minutes

Guest appearances
- Ben Feldman as Michael Ginsberg; Hayley McFarland as Bonnie; Mason Vale Cotton as Bobby Draper; John Sloman as Raymond Geiger; Stephen Mendel as Morris Ginsberg; Teyonah Parris as Dawn Chambers; Pamela Dunlap as Pauline Francis; Adria Tennor as Joyce Darling; Robin Pearson Rose as Alice Geiger; Ken Barnett as Dr. Horton; Sophia Bairley as Jo

Episode chronology
← Previous "A Little Kiss"	Next → "Mystery Date"
- Mad Men season 5

"Tea Leaves" is the third episode of the fifth season of the American television drama series Mad Men and overall the 55th episode of the series. It was written by series creator and executive producer Matthew Weiner and writer Erin Levy, and directed by series leading man Jon Hamm. It originally aired on the AMC channel in the United States on April 1, 2012.

The episode takes place on and around Independence Day 1966 and re-introduces the Betty Francis character into the narrative. Betty finds herself in a state of depression and experiences a health scare following an unsettling weight gain. Don and Harry collide with Baby Boomers while trying to meet with The Rolling Stones for a client. The rivalry between old guard Roger and an ascending Pete continues as Peggy hires a new copywriter with a questionable personality but high talent.

Ratings for the episode fell from the season premiere, but were still stronger than the fourth season average. "Tea Leaves" received 2.9 million overall viewers and a 1.0 in the coveted 18-49 demographic. The episode received enthusiastic response from television critics. The main theme of the episode was seen by many television writers as the growing generation gap, and the increasing irrelevance of the main characters in culture and business as a result.

== Plot ==
Betty has gained weight over the past few months, causing her self-worth to drop and her sex life with Henry to flatline. This prompts an intervention of sorts from Henry's mother, Pauline, who suggests diet pills. When Betty goes to the doctor's office to get some, the doctor refuses. After a routine examination, he finds a possibly cancerous lump in Betty's throat. Betty returns home in a fit of the vapours. She calls Don, who reassures her. Betty begins to confront the legacy of her life and the effect her death would have on her loved ones. Several days later, the doctor calls back to tell her the tumor is benign. Henry holds a despondent Betty in his arms. She ponders her life as simply a sad, fat housewife.

The Heinz executive speaks with Don about his daughters' obsession with The Rolling Stones, and floats an idea about getting The Rolling Stones to do a commercial for Heinz. Don agrees, though he is unimpressed with the idea. Harry and Don make a Saturday night trip to a Rolling Stones concert to meet with their manager Allen Klein. They end up making conversation backstage with two pot-smoking female fans. When Harry leaves with one of the girls to talk with Klein, Don waxes poetic with the other over her love for the band. She makes an insulting comment about the older generation. Don responds that the older generation is simply worried for youth. Harry fails miserably at his attempt to meet with The Rolling Stones, but Don is indifferent.

Pete is in talks with Mohawk Airlines for their return to the agency. The arrangement calls for Roger to handle the day-to-day business. Roger puts Peggy in charge of hiring a new male copywriter for Mohawk. Stan advises her to hire a mediocre employee to make her competition lighter. Peggy chooses to interview a talented young Jewish man named Michael Ginsberg whose work impresses her. When Peggy interviews Michael he is edgy, neurotic and over-the-top. Roger forces her to bring Michael to Don. During his interview with Don, Michael is more upstanding and professional, which puzzles Peggy. Michael is hired. He returns home to find his domineering father reading the paper. Michael's personality changes yet again, becoming this time more shy and reserved. When he learns of his son's success, Michael's father blesses his son with a Jewish prayer. Pete makes a puffed-up speech to the SCDP employees regarding his success in landing the Mohawk account. Roger walks out of the speech in anger, loathing his apparent descent in value to the agency.

== Production ==
"Tea Leaves" was written by Matthew Weiner and Erin Levy and directed by series star Jon Hamm. This is the first episode of the series that Jon Hamm had directed, with Hamm saying that he owes thanks to John Slattery for paving the way. As preparation for directing the Rolling Stones concert, Hamm looked over archival photographs of the original concert. "They were kids. The Rolling Stones. It was them and the Beatles. These huge pop explosions. People were really excited about it and it was a really big deal. And, in a larger sense, gave us a sense of where advertising is going." Reflecting on his directing job, Hamm noted that he tried not to put much distracting style into the show, explaining that "My job was not to go in there and muck it up and say, "I'm gonna put my stamp on this." My job was to go in there and keep the train on the tracks, basically. We have a very firmly established tone and look to our show that people respond to, and that I love." Although the third episode of the season, it was actually the first episode produced for season, prior to the two-part season premiere, "A Little Kiss".

Weiner said that the episode is "about the children. It's about who is going to take care of the children. Youth is a big part of our lives in general. Now and then. But when you think of the sixties and the youth culture and the way it sort of takes over. What you're looking at is Don's fear of the children being cut loose. At the same time, the children come back and eat you." Weiner commented that the Michael Ginsberg character was "of the next wave" as a youthful employee who is "unfamiliar with social rules", with Weiner also declaring that "there is no reason that the concerns of older people are different than younger people".

Of the storyline with Betty, Weiner said, "I don't think there's any mystery as to how that could happen. She is happy with Henry but on some level it's not enough." Jon Hamm and Matthew Weiner both commented that the episode showcases the strong connection between Betty and Don that still exists despite the divorce.

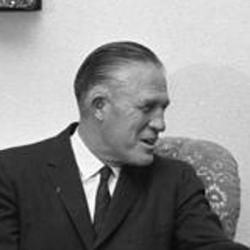
George W. Romney, Governor of Michigan in 1966, was mentioned by Henry Francis (Christopher Stanley)

=== George Romney controversy ===
"Tea Leaves" features a scene in which the Henry Francis character, a Republican political aide, insults George Romney, who was a political figure during the time in which the episode is set. Francis characterizes George Romney as a "clown" during the episode. Tagg Romney, eldest son of 2012 Presidential hopeful Mitt Romney, tweeted disgust for the mention, calling Mad Men the "lib media", and accused the series of mocking his grandfather. The Hollywood Reporter noted that the dig at Romney was based in historical fact: the Francis character is shown working for John Lindsay, who had actual disdain for Romney. The Reporter also noted that "Mad Men's formula for success comes from its careful duality: it revels in pinpoint accurate details from its 1960s setting, while playing with themes that are timeless. Sometimes that means a fortuitous opportunity to use news and names that have reappeared in the cycle of American history."

=== January Jones' pregnancy ===
January Jones became pregnant in between the fourth and fifth season of the series. Instead of writing in a pregnancy for the Betty Francis character, the writers opted to write in a weight gain. January Jones wore a fat suit during the filming of this episode, the same technique used by Elisabeth Moss during the first season when her character encountered a similar weight gain (though in that instance, the character was actually pregnant). Make-up tricks and clever camera angles were also used to create the dramatic impression of Betty's weight gain. A body double was used for the scene in which Betty rises from the bathtub.

== Reception ==
=== Ratings ===
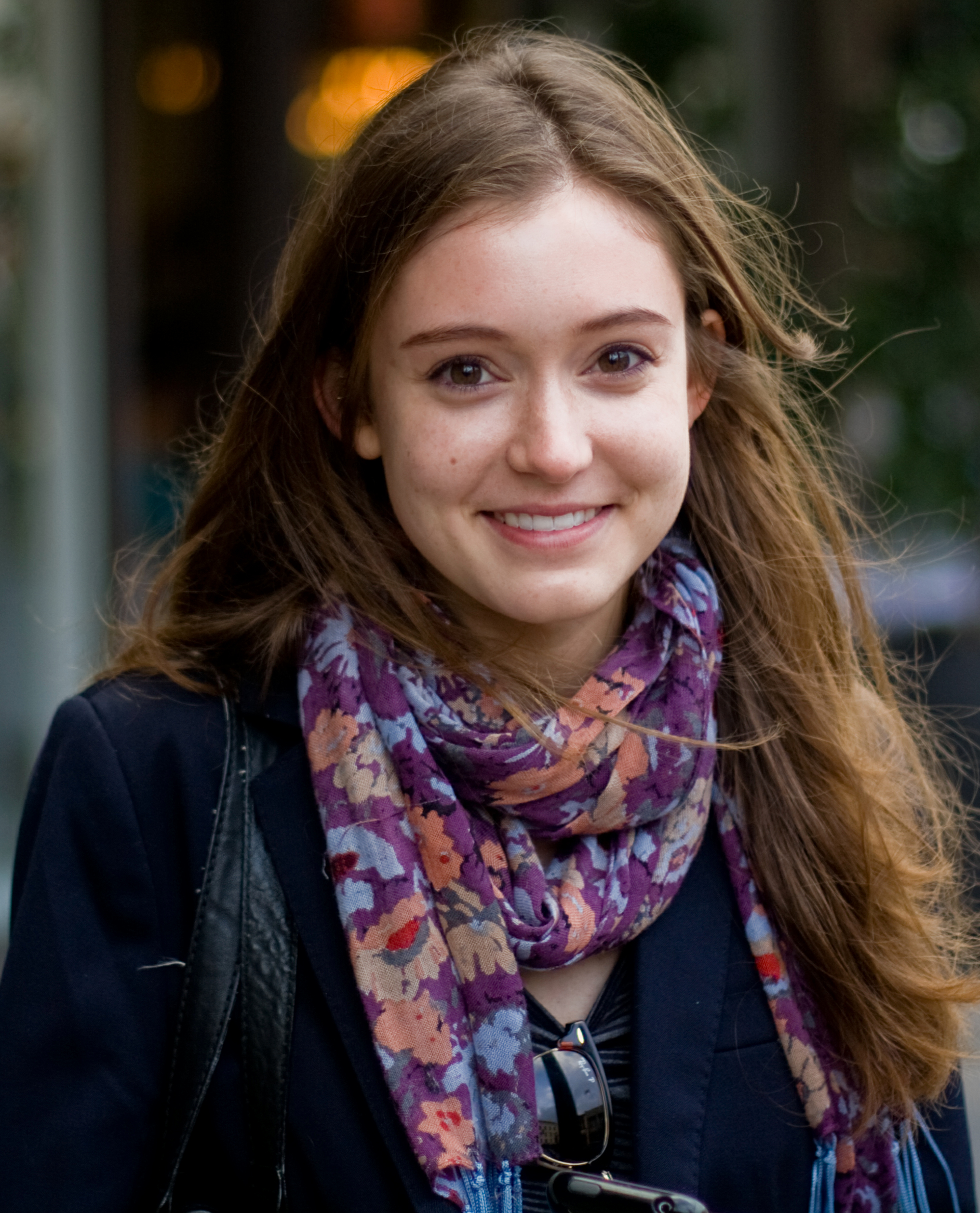
Hayley McFarland (pictured) played 'Bonnie'. Critics felt her scenes with Jon Hamm while backstage at a Rolling Stones concert were key to understanding the theme of the episode. Though Don estimates her character's age as fourteen, Hayley was roughly twenty around the time of filming.

The ratings for "Tea Leaves" were down slightly from the premiere's record-making number. It pulled in 2.9 million viewers, which was still stronger than all of the fourth-season episodes except for the fourth-season premiere, "Public Relations". "Tea Leaves" also received a 1.0 rating in the 18-49 demographic. It built on its lead-in, the second-season premiere of The Killing.

=== Critical reception ===
Critics were complimentary towards the episode, praising the acting talent of January Jones and the ensemble cast as well as Jon Hamm's debut in the director's chair. Some, however, were not as impressed by the fat suit techniques used on January Jones to both hide her pregnancy and convey the character's weight gain. Emily VanDerWerff of The A.V. Club gave the episode a B+. She felt that some of the scenes were too on-the-nose and that some of the symbolism was a little overt. VanDerWerff specifically cited the scenes where Don talks with the young girl at the concert as on-the-nose, comparing Don in this scene to Joe Friday. She did, however, praise the subplot involving Betty's weight gain as well as the final scene. Alan Sepinwall of HitFix said that all of the stories were linked by the threat of replacement and liked the interaction between Roger and Peggy, which he felt was a rare occurrence. He said that it was too soon to judge the Ginsberg character and that the Betty storyline was the weakest of the main plots. Writer Myles McNutt found January Jones "highly compelling" and the storyline offering a "decidedly human turn for the character, with her lunch with Joyce offering insight that we are robbed of without Betty having any friends to confide in normally."

Maureen Ryan of The Huffington Post praised Jon Hamm's direction and his "adherence to the Mad Men style" of "subtlety and economy". She said that it was not "one of the more profound episodes the show has ever done", but that it was full of "Mad Men-esque meditations on mortality and feeling left behind by changing times." Bonnie Stiernberg, writing for Paste Magazine, said that based on this episode and the premiere, season five will be about how "characters must learn to adapt to their changing surroundings or find themselves becoming irrelevant, relics of a bygone era". She praised the creative solution to January Jones' pregnancy and the new African-American secretary, who she saw as an extension of Don, who was "also hired by the agency as a way to save face". Tim Goodman, writing for The Hollywood Reporter, focused on the "key part" Roger Sterling plays in the season, saying that "since change is the ongoing issue of Mad Men, what has Roger been but unchanged for too long now". He also called the introduction of the Ginsberg character a "breath of fresh air."
