= The Rolling Stones British Tour 1966 =

1966 concert tour by the Rolling Stones

- Continental tour by the Rolling Stones
- Handbill for the concerts in Ipswich
- Location: UK, Europe
- Start date: 23 September 1966
- End date: 9 October 1966
- No. of shows: 23

the Rolling Stones concert chronology
- American Tour 1966; British Tour 1966; European Tour 1967

The Rolling Stones' 1966 British Tour was a concert tour by the band. The tour commenced on 23 September and concluded on 9 October 1966.

The opening acts were Ike & Tina Turner, the Kings Rhythm Orchestra, the Yardbirds and Peter Jay and the New Jaywalkers.

== The Rolling Stones ==
- Mick Jagger – lead vocals, harmonica, percussion
- Keith Richards – guitar, backing vocals
- Brian Jones – guitar, harmonica, electric dulcimer, organ, backing vocals
- Bill Wyman – bass guitar, backing vocals
- Charlie Watts – drums

== Tour set list ==
1. "Paint It, Black"
2. "Under My Thumb"
3. "Get Off of My Cloud"
4. "Lady Jane"
5. "Not Fade Away"
6. "The Last Time"
7. "19th Nervous Breakdown"
8. "Have You Seen Your Mother, Baby, Standing In The Shadow?"
9. "(I Can't Get No) Satisfaction"

== Tour dates ==
| Date | City | Country | Venue | Opening acts |
|---|---|---|---|---|
| 23 September 1966 | London | England | Royal Albert Hall | Ike & Tina Turner; The Yardbirds; Peter Jay and the New Jaywalkers; The Kings of Rhythm Orchestra |
| 24 September 1966 (2 shows) | Leeds | England | Odeon Theatre | Ike & Tina Turner; The Yardbirds; Peter Jay and the New Jaywalkers; The Kings of Rhythm Orchestra |
| 25 September 1966 (2 shows) | Liverpool | England | Empire Theatre | Ike & Tina Turner; The Yardbirds; Peter Jay and the New Jaywalkers; The Kings of Rhythm Orchestra |
| 28 September 1966 (2 shows) | Ardwick | England | ABC Ardwick | Ike & Tina Turner; The Yardbirds; Peter Jay and the New Jaywalkers; The Kings of Rhythm Orchestra |
| 29 September 1966 (2 shows) | Stockton-on-Tees | England | ABC Theatre | Ike & Tina Turner; The Yardbirds; Peter Jay and the New Jaywalkers; The Kings of Rhythm Orchestra |
| 30 September 1966 (2 shows) | Glasgow | Scotland | Odeon Theatre | Ike & Tina Turner; The Yardbirds; Peter Jay and the New Jaywalkers; The Kings of Rhythm Orchestra |
| 1 October 1966 (2 shows)[8] | Newcastle upon Tyne | England | City Hall | Ike & Tina Turner; The Yardbirds; Peter Jay and the New Jaywalkers; The Kings of Rhythm Orchestra |
| 2 October 1966 (2 shows) | Ipswich | England | Gaumont Theatre | Ike & Tina Turner; The Yardbirds; Peter Jay and the New Jaywalkers; The Kings of Rhythm Orchestra |
| 6 October 1966 (2 shows) | Birmingham | England | Birmingham Odeon | Ike & Tina Turner; The Yardbirds; Peter Jay and the New Jaywalkers; The Kings of Rhythm Orchestra |
| 7 October 1966 (2 shows) | Bristol | England | Colston Hall | Ike & Tina Turner; The Yardbirds; Peter Jay and the New Jaywalkers; The Kings of Rhythm Orchestra |
| 8 October 1966 (2 shows) | Cardiff | Wales | Capitol Theatre | Ike & Tina Turner; The Yardbirds; Peter Jay and the New Jaywalkers; The Kings of Rhythm Orchestra |
| 9 October 1966 (2 shows) | Southampton | England | Gaumont Theatre | Ike & Tina Turner; The Yardbirds; Peter Jay and the New Jaywalkers; The Kings of Rhythm Orchestra |
