= One Moment =

- Directed by: Deirdre O'Connor
- Written by: Deirdre O'Connor
- Starring: Danny Aiello; Adria Tennor; Frankie Ingrassia
- Release date: 2021 (Long Island)
- Running time: 114 minutes
- Country: United States
- Language: English

One Moment is a 2021 American comedy film written and directed by Deirdre O'Connor and starring Danny Aiello, Adria Tennor and Frankie Ingrassia. The film was partially filmed in Blue Point, New York. The film premiered at the Long Island Film Festival in 2021 and was released in theaters in May 2022 and on VOD in July 2022 under the Indican Pictures banner. Kyle Bain of Film Threat scored the film an 8.5 out of 10.

== Cast ==
- Danny Aiello as Joe McGuinness
- Adria Tennor as Caroline Minogue
- Frankie Ingrassia as Fran McGuinness
- Natalie Seus as Ellie Minogue
- Sal Rendino as Rick McGuinness
