= Zou Bisou Bisou =

- Cover art of Jessica Paré's version

Single by Gillian Hills, Sophia Loren, Jessica Paré, and others
- Released: 1960s, 2010s
- Songwriters: Bill Shepherd, Alan Tew, Michel Rivgauche (French version)

Music video
- Gillian Hills on YouTube

Music video
- Sophia Loren on YouTube

Music video
- Jessica Paré on YouTube

"Zou Bisou Bisou" (also known as "Zoo Be Zoo Be Zoo") is a song written by composers Bill Shepherd and Alan Tew, with Michel Rivgauche providing the lyrics for the French version of the song. The song's origins stem from the yé-yé movement, with which an early version of the song was associated. Its theme has been variously described as an open declaration of love and about the joy of kissing.

Released in the summer of 1960, "Zou Bisou Bisou" was Gillian Hills' first single. An English version, entitled "Zoo Be Zoo Be Zoo", was produced by George Martin and sung by Sophia Loren. Although most sources associate the origins of the song with Hills, New York claims that the songwriting credits make it more likely that Loren's version was the original. Slate's David Haglund notes that Hills' version is the best-known of the early recordings.

The song was performed by Jessica Paré as Megan Draper in the Mad Men episode "A Little Kiss", which was later released as a music download and as a vinyl special edition.

Swedish pop and soul singer Emilia Mitiku covered the song in 2013, on her album I Belong to You.

== Background and production ==
Martin's production of "Zoo Be Zoo Be Zoo" was originally recorded by Sophia Loren as publicity associated with the film The Millionairess (1960) on the album Peter and Sophia. Several sources, including a posting at AMC's website, state that Hills did not produce her version, with Rivgauche's lyrics, until 1961, after Loren's October 1960 film. Another version of the song, by Israeli-French performer Maya Casabianca, appeared on France's Billboard chart in September 1961. Additional cover versions have been produced by the Pennies and Kerstin Dahl.

Lionsgate Television released a music download edition of Paré's version at the iTunes Store as well as two vinyl editions made available online. It will also be released in the future on Amazon.com and in stores. This version was produced by Matthew Weiner, Russell Ziecker, David Carbonara, and James T. Hill. Paré recorded her lyrics in a recording studio, working with Carbonara, and choreographed her routine with Marianne Ann Kellogg. The 7-inch vinyl version includes the B-side "A Beautiful Mine" by RJD2, which is the theme music for the show. Weiner tracked down the song and had many objectives for Paré to achieve in the production of the song. Pare's version was used in the second episode of season 3 of Emily in Paris.

== Charts ==
Chart (2012)	Peak position
Canada (Canadian Hot 100)	100

== Themes ==
Roughly translated from French to English, "Zou Bisou Bisou" means "Oh! Kiss Kiss" or "Oh You Kiss Kiss".

After translating the song, Haglund claimed that the theme of the song is about "...openly declaring and displaying one's love, coming out from 'the bushes' where 'lovers glide stealthily' and feeling love 'everywhere'". The Huffington Post summarized the song more simply saying that it made the statement "about how kissing is fun". Slate noted that yé-yé singers were often "teenage girls who exuded a faux-innocent sexuality", which played on Megan Draper's "youthful sex appeal and the generation gap between Megan and Don". Paré stated that, "Megan, who is younger and more naïve than Don, was 'unknowingly putting their intimate connection on the line' in front of their friends and co-workers'... 'The reason that it's so awkward isn't that she was doing anything wrong, but because it's private'."

== Critical response to Mad Men scene ==
Numerous critics from prominent media outlets such as The Wall Street Journal, Slate, USA Today, Rolling Stone, New York Daily News, Los Angeles Times, Chicago Sun-Times, CBS News, noted that the highlight of the fifth season premiere of Mad Men was Paré's performance of this song during Don Draper's surprise 40th birthday party, describing the performance and Paré as sexy, slinky, and sultry. Matthew Perpetua of Rolling Stone said that "Megan sings...for her husband, who can barely suppress his embarrassment and discomfort."

The song's performance became a trending topic on Twitter. Since the song was trending the entire following day, the Roots performed a brief rendition of a verse of the song as interstitial music the following night on Late Night with Jimmy Fallon. Despite the social media frenzy, the song did not crack the iTunes Top 100. On 14 April 2012, however, it did manage to reach the lowest position of the Canadian Hot 100, at No. 100.
