= Three (1969 film) =

British drama by James Salter

- Theatrical release poster
- Directed by: James Salter
- Screenplay by: James Salter
- Based on: Then We Were Three by Irwin Shaw
- Produced by: Bruce Becker
- Starring: Charlotte Rampling; Robie Porter; Sam Waterston; Pascale Roberts; Edina Ronay; Gillian Hills
- Cinematography: Étienne Becker
- Edited by: Edward Nielsen
- Music by: Laurence Rosenthal
- Production company: Obelisk
- Distributed by: United Artists
- Release date: 23 December 1969
- Running time: 104 minutes
- Country: United Kingdom
- Language: English

Three is a 1969 British drama film written and directed by James Salter. The film stars Charlotte Rampling, Robie Porter, Sam Waterston, Pascale Roberts, Edina Ronay and Gillian Hills. The film was released on 23 December 1969, by United Artists.

== Synopsis ==
Two American college friends travel in Europe near the Mediterranean. They meet many women, but an English tourist catches their attention, and they become friends with her.

== Cast ==
- Charlotte Rampling as Marty
- Robie Porter as Bert
- Sam Waterston as Taylor
- Pascale Roberts as Claude
- Edina Ronay as Liz
- Gillian Hills as Ann
- Alfredo Rizzo as waiter
- Paul Cooper as photographer
- Patrizia Giammei as Gloria
- Mario Cotone as Silvano
- Franca Tasso as Hélène
- Roberto Scheiber as Piero

== Reception ==
The Monthly Film Bulletin wrote: "A first film which allows a not too ostentatiously attractive cast (unknowns at the time; Charlotte Rampling and Sam Waterston about to become more conspicuous with Zardoz and The Great Gatsby respectively) to supply what little personality the project has. Tyro writer-director James Salter subsequently provided the screenplay for Downhill Racer, and Three appears to be a very dry run for the later film: ambiguous action, coolly inscrutable characters, dialogue that is little more than half-heard clichés. ... Three becomes entirely neutral in tone, flatly encompassing a stream of uncomplicated incident that provokes the three travellers ... neither to change nor to reveal themselves. Having decided to tell a story about people instead of simply telling a story, Salter fails to establish their credentials as characters and remains at an awkward remove from their situation; distance unhappily lending no perspective on the exchanges of mumbled banalities. ... Visually, Three maintains the atmosphere of a superior travelogue; thanks to either Salter or his cameraman, the subtle differences between the places visited emerge and blend into a casual summer-time drift of experience. The trouble is that there never seems to be any good reason why we should be drifting in the company of these three."
