= Adria Tennor =

American actress, writer, and director

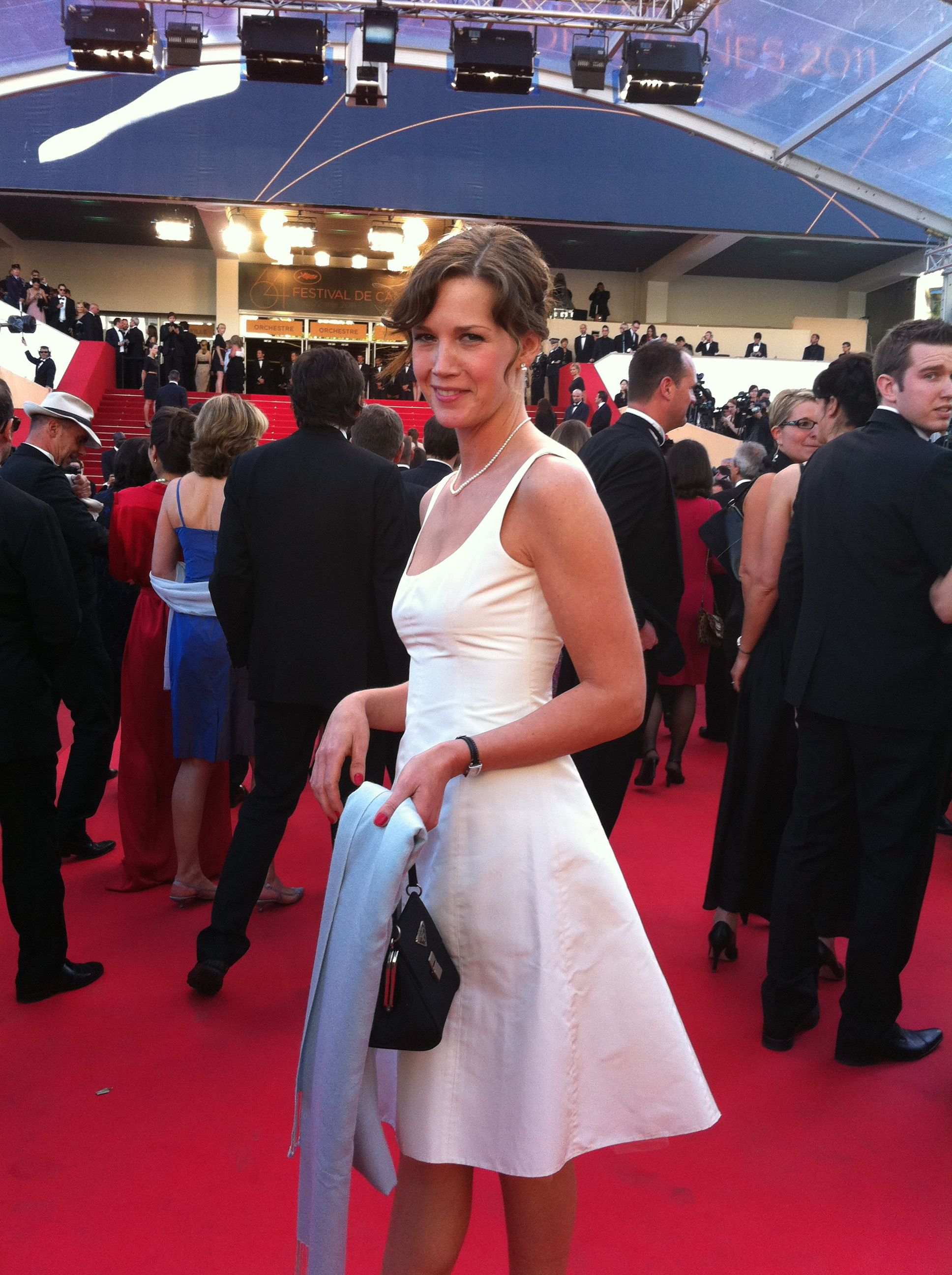
- Born: Royal Oak, Michigan, U.S.
- Occupations: Actress; writer; director; producer
- Years active: 1994–present
- Spouse: Claudio Blotta (m. 2006; div. 2022)

Adria Tennor is an American actress, writer, and director. She is best known for her work in the film The Artist (2011), as well as the television series Greek, Mad Men, and Mad Dogs.

== Life and career ==
She began her career playing a twelve-year-old boy opposite Martin Donovan in Hal Hartley’s Amateur (1994). In 2006, she wrote and starred in the one-woman show, StripSearch, about finding love and happiness with the help of a pole.

In 2018, Adria wrote, directed and produced a short film, Pie starring herself, Chloe Lanier and Jessica Paré. In 2020, she partnered with Kristen Tracy, to launch the short-format series, Fetish, which she co-created, directed and produced.

== Personal life ==
In 2006, Adria married restaurateur Claudio Blotta and the two opened four restaurants together. They divorced in 2022.

== Filmography ==
Year	Film	Director	Writer	Producer	Note
2015	Cracked	Yes	Yes	Yes	Short film
2018	Pie	Yes	Yes	Yes	Short film
2020	Fetish	Yes	Yes	Yes	TV series

=== Film ===
Year	Title	Role	Notes
1994	Amateur	Kid reading 'The Odyssey'	
1995	Boys Don't Cry		Short film
1996	The First Wives Club	Young Annie	
1998	I'm Losing You	Assistant director	
2001	The Hollywood Sign	Kant's Receptionist	
2005	Headhunter		
2007	Judy's Got a Gun	Donna Kenzo	TV movie
2008	You Don't Mess with the Zohan	Kids' Salon Owner	
2009	You	Hostile Witness	
2011	Fort McCoy	Lolly	
2011	The Artist	Zimmer's Assistant	
2012	Incident on Marmont Avenue	Daphne	Short film
2013	Ladies' Man: A Made Movie	Toby's Mom	TV movie
2013	Trooper	Miriam Stanhope	TV movie
2014	Square the Circle		Short film
2015	The D Train	Classmate - Wendy	
2015	Golden Thread	Nancy	Short film
2016	Smothered	Mom	
2016	Friday Night	Claire	Short film
2016	Bad Moms	Conservative Mom	
2017	Newly Single	Waitress	
2018	Pie	Carol	Short film
2018	Elusive	Lucy	Short film
2019	Wyrm	Julia	
2019	Miss Virginia	Donna	
2020	Psychos & Socios	Leslie	
2021	One Moment	Caroline Minogue	

=== Television ===
Year	Title	Role	Notes
1997	Step by Step	Candi	1 episode
1998	Boy Meets World	Teri	1 episode
2000	Touched by an Angel	Ruby Rice	1 episode
2002	Crossing Jordan	Denice	1 episode
2002	Friends	Katherine	1 episode
2004	JAG	Laurie June	3 episodes
2007-12	Mad Men	Joyce Darling	3 episodes
2007	Cold Case	Heidi Jenner '07	1 episode
2007	Criminal Minds	Diane Goehring	1 episode
2009	Safety Geeks: SVI	Falling Shopper	1 episode
2009	Gary Unmarried	Waitress	1 episode
2009	Monk	Donna DiMarco	1 episode
2010-11	Greek	Professor Clarissa Hawn	4 episodes
2011	The Mentalist	Event Hostess	1 episode
2011	Private Practice	Dr. Berman	1 episode
2012	Harry's Law	Vivian	1 episode
2012	Scandal	Brenda Swan	1 episode
2013	Back in the Game	Mrs. Douglas	1 episode
2014	Faking It	Doris	1 episode
2014	Mulaney	Flight Attendant	1 episode
2014-15	Stay-At-Home Actors	Claire	1 episode
2015	The Mindy Project	Gate Agent	1 episode
2016	Mad Dogs	Abby	3 episodes
2016	NCIS	Angela Dresser	1 episode
2018-2019	For the People	Susan Womack	2 episodes
2020	Fetish	Paula Wheeler	6 episodes

== Awards and nominations ==
Year	Result	Award	Category	Work	Ref.
2015	Nominated	Nantucket Film Festival	Tony Cox Award for Screenwriting	Never Been Born	
2016	Nominated	Nashville Film Festival	Feature Film Script	Never Been Born	
2016	Nominated	Woods Hole Film Festival	Screenplay Award	Never Been Born	
2018	Won	Cleveland International Film Festival	Best After Hours Short	Pie	
2018	Won	Woods Hole Film Festival	Audience Award	Pie	
