= The Artist (film) =

- Theatrical release poster
- Directed by: Michel Hazanavicius
- Written by: Michel Hazanavicius
- Produced by: Thomas Langmann
- Starring: Jean Dujardin; Bérénice Bejo; James Cromwell; Penelope Ann Miller; Malcolm McDowell; Missi Pyle; Beth Grant; Ed Lauter; Joel Murray; Ken Davitian; John Goodman
- Cinematography: Guillaume Schiffman
- Edited by: Anne-Sophie Bion; Michel Hazanavicius
- Music by: Ludovic Bource
- Production companies: La Petite Reine; Studio 37; La Classe Américaine; JD Prod; France 3 Cinéma; Jouror Productions; uFilm
- Distributed by: Warner Bros. Pictures
- Release dates: 15 May 2011 (Cannes); 12 October 2011 (France)
- Running time: 100 minutes
- Countries: France; Belgium
- Budget: $15 million
- Box office: $133.4 million

The Artist is a 2011 French-Belgian (Note: There has been some confusion on whether the film is French or American. The official American website states it "is the first American film by acclaimed French writer/director Michel Hazanavicius", while the Academy of Motion Picture Arts and Sciences and mass media describe it as a French film, given that the film was directed and produced by Frenchmen and that the two lead roles are played by French actors. However, 17 supporting roles are played by American actors.) comedy-drama film (Note: Several sources list the film as a "romantic comedy" or a "romantic comedy-drama". However, there is no romance plot in the film.) in the style of a black-and-white silent film or part-talkie. It was written and directed by Michel Hazanavicius, produced by Thomas Langmann and stars Jean Dujardin and Bérénice Bejo. The story takes place in Hollywood, between 1927 and 1932, and focuses on the relationship between a rising young actress and an older silent film star as silent cinema falls out of fashion and is replaced by the "talkies".

The Artist received widespread critical acclaim and won many accolades. Dujardin won Best Actor at the 2011 Cannes Film Festival, where the film premiered. The film was nominated for six Golden Globes, the most of any 2011 film, and won three: Best Motion Picture – Musical or Comedy, Best Original Score, and Best Actor – Motion Picture Musical or Comedy for Dujardin. In January 2012, it was nominated for twelve BAFTAs, the most of any film from 2011, and won seven, including Best Film, Best Director, Best Actor for Dujardin, and Best Original Screenplay for Hazanavicius.

It was nominated for ten Academy Awards and won five, including Best Picture, Best Director for Hazanavicius, and Best Actor for Dujardin, making him the first French actor ever to win in this category. It was also the first non-American/non-British film to ever win Best Picture, the first mainly silent film to win since 1927's Wings won at the 1st Academy Awards in 1929, the first film presented in the 4:3 aspect ratio to win since 1953's From Here to Eternity, the first black-and-white film to win since 1993's Schindler's List, though the latter contained limited colour sequences; and the first 100% black-and-white film to win since 1960's The Apartment.

In France it was nominated for ten César Awards, winning six, including Best Film, Best Director for Hazanavicius, and Best Actress for Bejo. The Artist has received more awards than any other French film.

== Plot ==
In 1927, silent film star George Valentin is posing for pictures outside the premiere of his latest hit film when a young woman, Peppy Miller, accidentally bumps into him. Valentin reacts with humor and shows off with Peppy for the cameras. The next day, Peppy is on the front page of Variety with the headline "Who's That Girl?" She capitalizes by auditioning as a dancer and is spotted by Valentin, who insists that she have a part in Kinograph Studios' next production, despite objections from studio boss Al Zimmer. While performing a scene in which they dance together, Valentin and Peppy show great chemistry. With a little guidance from Valentin, who draws a beauty spot on her cheek, Peppy rises through the industry, earning more prominent starring roles.

Two years later, Zimmer announces plans to cease production of silent films at Kinograph Studios, but Valentin is dismissive, insisting that sound is just a fad. In a dream, he begins hearing sounds from his environment (as does the audience) but cannot speak himself. He decides to leave the studio for the chance to produce, finance, and direct his own silent film, Tears of Love. The film opens on the same day as Peppy's new sound film Beauty Spot and the 1929 stock market crash. Valentin's only chance of avoiding bankruptcy is for his film to be a hit. Unfortunately, audiences flock to Peppy's film instead, while only a few people attend Valentin's. With Valentin ruined, his wife, Doris, kicks him out, and he moves into an apartment with his valet/chauffeur, Clifton, and his dog. Peppy quickly becomes the first of several major new Hollywood sound film stars.

Later, the bankrupt Valentin is forced to auction his personal effects, and after realizing he has not paid the loyal Clifton in over a year, gives him his car before firing him. Depressed and drunk, Valentin sets fire to a stack of his old films. As the nitrate film blazes out of control, he is overwhelmed by the smoke and passes out inside the burning house, clutching a single film canister. However, Valentin's dog attracts the help of a nearby policeman, and after being rescued, Valentin is hospitalized for injuries suffered in the fire. Peppy visits the hospital and discovers that the film he rescued is the one with them dancing together. She asks for him to be moved to her house to recuperate. Valentin awakens in a bed at her house to find that Clifton is now working for Peppy. His ego hurt, Valentin shows ingratitude for Peppy having taken him in, prompting Clifton to remind him of his changing luck.

Peppy insists to Zimmer that Valentin co-star in her next film, threatening to quit Kinograph if he does not agree. After Valentin learns that Peppy bought his possessions at auction, he returns in despair to his burnt-out apartment. Peppy arrives and finds that Valentin is about to attempt suicide. She tells him she only wanted to help him. They embrace, and Valentin tells her it is no use; no one wants to hear him speak. Remembering Valentin's superb dancing ability, Peppy persuades Zimmer to let her make a musical production so Valentin can avoid the humiliation of having to speak.

Now the audience hears sound for the second time, as the film starts rolling for a dance scene with Peppy and Valentin and their tap-dancing can be heard. Once the choreography is complete, the two dancers are heard panting. The director of the musical calls, "Cut!" to which Zimmer adds: "Perfect. Beautiful. Could you give me just one more?" Valentin, in his only audible line, replies "With pleasure," revealing a French accent. The camera then pulls back to the sounds of the film crew as they prepare to shoot another take.

== Cast ==
- Jean Dujardin as George Valentin
- Bérénice Bejo as Peppy Miller
- Uggie as Jack, The Dog
- John Goodman as Al Zimmer
- James Cromwell as Clifton
- Missi Pyle as Constance
- Penelope Ann Miller as Doris Valentin
- Malcolm McDowell as The Butler
- Bitsie Tulloch as Norma
- Beth Grant as Peppy's Maid
- Ed Lauter as Peppy's First Chauffeur
- Joel Murray as Police Office Fire
- Ken Davitian as Pawnbroker
- Jen Lilley as Onlooker
- Nina Siemaszko as Admiring Woman
- Jewel Shepard as Flapper Starlet
- Basil Hoffman as Auctioneer
- Ben Kurland as Casting Assistant
- Bill Fagerbakke as Policeman
- Adria Tennor as Zimmer's Assistant
- Ezra Buzzington as Journalist
- Stuart Pankin as Director #1
- Andy Milder as Director #2

== Production ==
=== Development ===
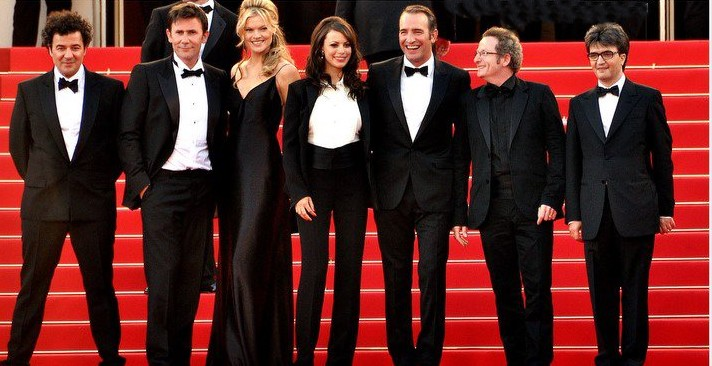
Some of the cast and crew at the 2011 Cannes Film Festival: (left to right), score composer Ludovic Bource, director Michel Hazanavicius, stars Missi Pyle, Bérénice Bejo, and Jean Dujardin, director of photography Guillaume Schiffman and producer Thomas Langmann.

Director Michel Hazanavicius had been fantasizing about making a silent film for many years, both because many filmmakers he admires emerged in the silent era, and because of the image-driven nature of the form. According to Hazanavicius, his wish to make a silent film was at first not taken seriously, but after the financial success of his spy-film pastiches OSS 117: Cairo, Nest of Spies and OSS 117: Lost in Rio, producers started to express interest. The forming of the film's narrative started with Hazanavicius' desire to work again with actors Jean Dujardin and Bérénice Bejo, who had both starred in OSS 117: Cairo, Nest of Spies. Hazanavicius chose the form of a melodrama, mostly because he thought many of the films from the silent era that have aged best are of that genre. He did extensive research about 1920s Hollywood, and studied silent films to find the right techniques to make the story comprehensible without having to use too many intertitles. The screenplay took four months to write and was principally inspired by the 1928 silent comedy, Show People.

Chief among the influences shaping the screenplay's protagonist was Douglas Fairbanks. The Academy of Motion Picture Arts and Sciences' recent book Douglas Fairbanks, by Jeffrey Vance, as well as the academy's Douglas Fairbanks exhibition and screening events both in Los Angeles and New York City, afforded Hollywood's first swashbuckling hero and the academy's first president some significant media attention.

=== Filming ===
Principal photography on The Artist began in November 2010, taking place over the course of thirty-five days, made in the 1.33:1 screen ratio commonly used in the silent film era. Though presented in black-and-white, it was shot in color by cinematographer Guillaume Schiffman. All the technical details, including lenses, lighting and camera moves, were calibrated to aesthetically match silent films of the period. To recreate the slightly sped-up look of 1920s silent films, the film was shot at a slightly lower frame rate of 22 fps as opposed to the standard 24 fps. Most of the film is silent, except for two brief scenes with sound as well as the non-diegetic soundtrack. Throughout the shoot, Hazanavicius played music from classic Hollywood films while the actors performed.

The film was produced by La Petite Reine and ARP Sélection for 13.47 million euro, including co-production support from Studio 37 and France 3 Cinéma, and pre-sales investment from StudioCanal and CinéCinéma. The cast and the crew included both French and American members. All the scenes were shot in Los Angeles, primarily in Hollywood, but also in downtown theaters, restaurants and houses, including the one in which Mary Pickford lived. Soundstage work was done at Red Studios, and the studio lot itself doubled for part of the fictional Kinograph Studios lot, with Red's Lillian Way entrance doubling as the Kinograph entrance in several sequences. The iconic Bradbury Building in downtown L.A. provided the location for the film's distinctive staircase sequence. The dance sequence that closes the film took seventeen takes, and required Dujardin and Bejo to spend five months studying tap dancing, with Dujardin claiming that "in the first week it's fun, the fifth week it's a little boring, at the end it's thrilling".

American costume designer Mark Bridges created the wardrobe for the film's cast.

=== Music ===
The film's music was largely composed by Ludovic Bource, but includes works by other composers such as Alberto Ginastera's "Estancia". The soundtrack was recorded in Belgium by the Brussels Philharmonic and was conducted by Ernst Van Tiel; the Brussels Jazz Orchestra also cooperated. The recording took place during six days in April 2011 at Flagey's Studio 4 in Brussels.

The film's climactic scene is set to Bernard Herrmann's "Scène d'amour" from his score to Alfred Hitchcock's film Vertigo. In Vertigo, that composition similarly accompanies an extended scene without dialogue. Only one song (sung, with lyrics) is used in the soundtrack, "Pennies from Heaven", sung by Rose "Chi-Chi" Murphy (uncredited). This song was written in 1936 although the film is set between 1927 and 1932. The soundtrack was released on 10 October in France, and 21 October in the U.K. and U.S. through Sony Classical Records.

== Release ==
=== Theatrical ===
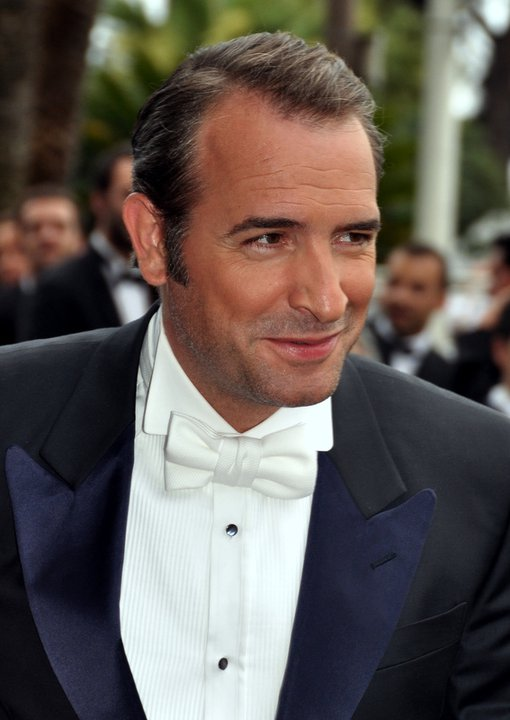
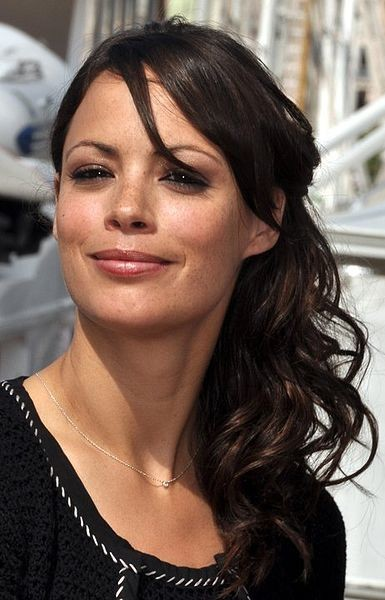
Jean Dujardin and Bérénice Bejo at the 2011 Cannes Film Festival

The film premiered on 15 May 2011 in competition at the 2011 Cannes Film Festival. It was initially announced as an out of competition entry, but was moved to the competition a week before the festival opened. The French regular release was on 12 October 2011 through Warner Bros. France. The Weinstein Company bought the distribution rights for the US, UK, Australia, South Africa, Latin America and Eastern Europe, with the film also selling to Comstock and GAGA in Japan and Delphi Film in Germany. The film was initially given a limited release in the United States on 23 November 2011.

Following its wins at the 69th Golden Globe Awards, it was announced Warner Bros. would re-release the film in France in 362 theaters on 25 January 2012. It was also re-released in Belgium on 22 February 2012.

=== Home media ===
The Artist was released on region 1 DVD and Blu-ray on 26 June 2012. It was released in the UK by Entertainment in Video on 28 May 2012.

== Reception ==
=== Box office ===
The Artist grossed $44,671,682 in North America, along with $88,761,174 in other territories for a worldwide total of $133,432,856. After its success at the Academy Awards, the film saw a moderate boost the following week on the box office in North America. It appeared on the week's top 10 chart and got an increase of 34% while expanding its release from 966 theaters to 1,756.

=== Critical response ===
On review aggregator Rotten Tomatoes the film has an approval rating of 95% based on 327 reviews, with an average rating of 8.8/10. The website's critical consensus states, "A crowd-pleasing tribute to the magic of silent cinema, The Artist is a clever, joyous film with delightful performances and visual style to spare." At Metacritic, which assigns a weighted average rating to reviews, the film received an average score of 89 out of 100, based on 41 critics, indicating "universal acclaim". Audiences surveyed by CinemaScore gave the film an average grade of "A" on an A+ to F scale.

Mark Adams of Screen Daily called the film "a real pleasure"; "propelled elegantly forward by delightful performances from Jean Dujardin and Bérénice Bejo it is the most unlikely of feel-good movies." He added however: "The film does feel a little sluggish towards the end of the first third as the music is a little repetitive and the intertitles are infrequent, but Hazanavicius manages to give the film a real sense of charm and warmth, and film fans will be competing to spot visual and musical references." Peter Bradshaw of The Guardian described how the film "had me on my feet cheering throughout the final credits" and stated "I can't wait to see it again".

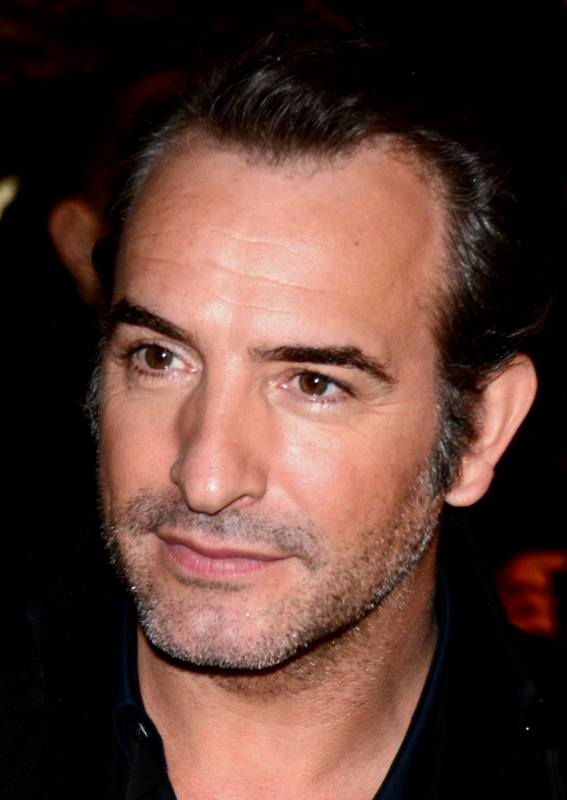
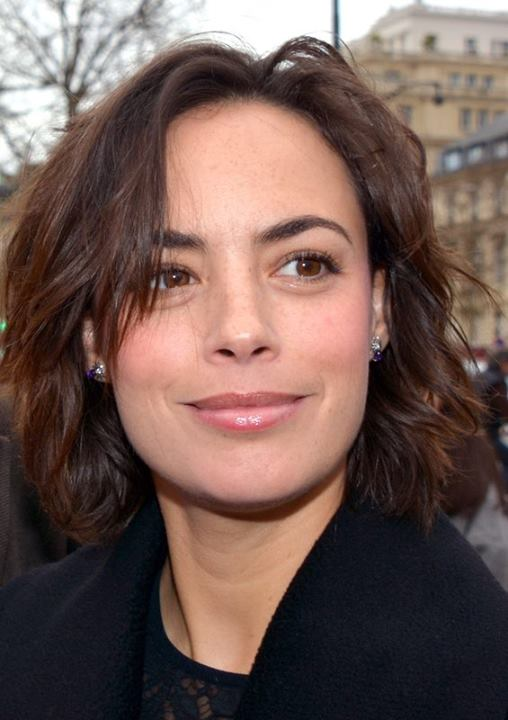
The performances of Jean Dujardin and Bérénice Bejo garnered critical acclaim, earning them Academy Award nominations for Best Actor and Best Supporting Actress respectively, with Dujardin winning his category.

Geoffrey McNab at The Independent called the film "both a surefire crowdpleaser and a magnificent piece of film-making" in his 5 star review from the Cannes Film Festival. Rick Groen of The Globe and Mail assessed The Artist highly, noting the film "uses old technology to dazzling effect to illustrate the insistent conquest of a new technology." Sukanya Verma for Rediff.com feels The Artist is an extremely well-researched film and is an instant classic. David Thomson of The New Republic called The Artist an "accomplished and witty entertainment" and went on to write, "Whether Hazanavicius can do more things as elegant and touching, without the gimmick of silence, remains to be seen (and heard). Meanwhile, he is to be congratulated on the grounds of pleasure alone. He may be due for much more in the way of rewards." Chicago Sun-Times film critic Roger Ebert gave the film four out of four stars, praising the performances, and calling the film "one of the most entertaining films in many a moon, a film that charms because of its story, its performances and because of the sly way it plays with being silent and black and white."

Writing for Slant Magazine, Jaime N. Christley gave the film one-and-a-half out of four stars, explaining Michel Hazanavicius ignores "everything that's fascinating and memorable about the era, focusing instead on a patchwork of general knowledge, so eroded of inconvenient facts that it doesn't even qualify as a roman à clef." America argued that while Jean Dujardin carried the film, Bejo's performance was disappointing.

=== Kim Novak controversy ===
On 9 January 2012, actress Kim Novak stated that "rape" had been metaphorically committed in the film's licensed use of a portion of Bernard Herrmann's score from Alfred Hitchcock's 1958 film Vertigo (in which Novak starred). The final portion of The Artist is accompanied not by original music, but by a 1992 recording of the Herrmann composition Scene d'Amour, conducted by Elmer Bernstein. In the article published, by Variety, she stated that "I feel as if my body—or at least my body of work—has been violated by the movie." "This film should've been able to stand on its own without depending on Bernard Herrmann's score from Alfred Hitchcock's Vertigo to provide more drama" and that "It is morally wrong for the artistry of our industry to use and abuse famous pieces of work to gain attention and applause for other than what they were intended", ending her comments with "Shame on them!"

In response, director Hazanavicius released a statement:

The Artist was made as a love letter to cinema, and grew out of my (and all of my cast and crew's) admiration and respect for movies throughout history. It was inspired by the work of Hitchcock, Lang, Ford, Lubitsch, Murnau and Wilder. I love Bernard Herrmann and his music has been used in many different films and I'm very pleased to have it in mine. I respect Kim Novak greatly and I'm sorry to hear she disagrees.

Hazanavicius also told CNN "I used music from another movie, but it's not illegal. We paid for that, we asked for that and we had the permission to do it. For me there is no real controversy.... I feel sorry for her, but there's a lot of movies with music from other movies, directors do that all the time and I'm not sure it's a big deal."

In May 2011, when the film was first shown at the Cannes Festival, Todd McCarthy from The Hollywood Reporter mentioned the use of Herrmann's music, "Hazanavicius and Bource daringly choose to explicitly employ Bernard Herrmann's love theme from Vertigo, which is dramatically effective in its own right but is so well known that it yanks you out of one film and places you in the mind-set of another. Surely some sort of reworked equivalent would have been a better idea."

=== Accolades ===
At the 65th British Academy Film Awards, the film won seven awards, including Best Film, Best Actor for Dujardin, Best Original Screenplay for Hazanavicius, Cinematography for Schiffman, Costume Design for Bridges and Original Score for Ludovic Bource. At the 69th Golden Globe Awards, the film was nominated for six Golden Globes to win three of them; Best Motion Picture – Musical or Comedy, Best Actor – Motion Picture Musical or Comedy for Dujardin and Best Musical Score for Bource.

At the 84th Academy Awards, The Artist received ten nominations, winning five awards, including Best Picture, Best Director for Hazanavicius, Best Actor in a Leading Role for Jean Dujardin, Best Costume Design, and Best Original Score.

== See also ==
- List of black-and-white films produced since 1966
- List of films featuring fictional films
