= Frankie Ingrassia =

American actress

- Born: U.S.
- Occupations: Actress; writer; director; producer
- Years active: 1993–1995; 1999–2000; 2006–present

Frankie Ingrassia is an American actress and filmmaker.

== Life and career ==
Frankie Ingrassia was born of Sicilian-Italian origin. Raised in Los Angeles, she is known for her role in Alexander Payne's Election. Her first directed feature film is Vampire Dad which was released in June 2020.

== Filmography ==
=== Film ===
Year	Title	Role	Note
1999	Election	Lisa Flanagan	
1999	Miss Supreme Queen	Amber Ray Pruitt	Short film
2000	Glow	Anna	
2006	Marcus	Brooke	
2008	Under Still Waters	Abigail	
2008	Shocktrooper	Woman	Short film
2011	The Greening of Whitney Brown	Interior Designer	
2011	The Rum Diary	Party Girl	Uncredited
2017	Flipped the Script	Woman	Short film; also Director, Producer and Writer
2019	One Moment	Fran	

=== Television ===
Year	Title	Role	Note
1993-1995	Secret Adventures	Marcy	Television mini-series
1993	The Positively True Adventures of the Alleged Texas Cheerleader-Murdering Mom	Shanna Harper	Television film
1995	Terror in the Shadows	Carolyn	Television film
1999	The X-Files	Cindy Culpepper	Episode: "The Rain King"; Credited as Francesca Ingrassia
1999	Undressed	Samantha	Recurring role; 5 episodes
2000	Malcolm in the Middle	Becky	Episode: "Dinner Out"; Credited as Francesca Ingrassia
2005, 2008	Monk	Dr. Charles Kroger's Receptionist	Guest role; 2 episodes
2006	In Justice	Lisa Debrizzi	Episode: "Brothers and Sisters"
2006	Without a Trace	Bianca Stone	Episode: "Check Your Head"; Credited as Francesca Ingrassia
2007	Random! Cartoons	Tess	Episode: "Girls on the Go!"; voice role
2008-2012	Metalocalypse	Rachel/ Screamimg Audience Member / Stewardess	Recurring role, 4 episodes; voice role
2008	Cold Case	Donna D'Amico '81	Episode: "The Dealer"
2009	The Mentalist	Gina	Episode: "Red Sauce"
2011	Against the Wall	Vicki Fields	Episode: "Boys Are Back"
2013	Grey's Anatomy	Tyler's Mom	Episode: "Readiness Is All"
2015	Bones	Hilary Featherson	Episode: "The Psychic in the Soup"
2016-2021	Goliath	Frankie	Recurring role; 7 episodes
2017	Colony	Mother	Episode: "Ronin"
2017-2019	The Jellies	Taylor Swift / Producer	Recurring role; 6 episodes
2019	For the People	Karen Petrini	Episode: "A Choice Between Two Things"
2025	9-1-1	Isabelle	Guest role; 2 episodes

=== Video games ===
Year	Title	Role	Notes
2007	Skate.	Female	Voice role

=== Director ===
Year	Title	Notes
2015-2016	Humane Treatment	Television series; 7 episodes
2015-2017	Hey You, It's Me	Television series, 4 episodes; also Co-Producer
2017	Jump	Short film
2017-2018	Female Friendly	Television series; 7 episodes
2020	Vampire Dad	Feature film, Directorial debut; also Co-Producer and Writer
2021	Detach	Short film; also Producer and Writer
