= Gillian Hills =

British actress

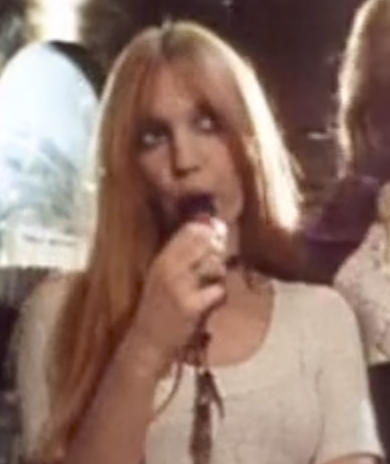
- Hills in the trailer for A Clockwork Orange (1971)
- Born: Gillian Hills; 5 June 1944 (age 81); Cairo, Kingdom of Egypt
- Occupations: Actress, singer
- Years active: 1959–1974

Gillian Hills (born 5 June 1944) is a British actress and singer. She first came to notice as a teenager in the 1960s in the British films Beat Girl (1960) and Blowup (1966). She also spent several years living in France, where she embarked on a singing career as well as starring in a number of French films.

== Career ==
Born in Cairo, Kingdom of Egypt, Hills is the daughter of teacher, traveller, author, and adventurer Denis Hills. Her mother was Wanda "Dunia" Leśmianówna, daughter of Polish-Jewish poet Bolesław Leśmian. She spent her early years in Nice (France), where she was discovered at 14 by Roger Vadim, the director of And God Created Woman and Barbarella, who saw her as the next Brigitte Bardot and cast her in a version of Les Liaisons dangereuses (1959).

At 15, Hills was cast in the lead for the British film Beat Girl, made in 1959 and released in 1960. This was John Barry's first film score. Her co-star was a young Adam Faith in his first film role. The British Board of Film Censors ordered cuts to be made before they would give it an X certificate. In 2016, the British Film Institute remastered Beat Girl from the original negative and recorded an interview with Hills for the DVD release.

In 1960, Hills cut her first recordings with Henri Salvador, "Près de la cascade" and "Cha cha stop", for the French Barclay record label on an EP entitled "Allo Brigitte? Ne coupez pas!". In 1961, she appeared at the Olympia Theatre in Paris on a bill with Johnny Hallyday. She remained with the Barclay label until 1964, having released both cover versions and original self-penned recordings.

Hills had hits with "Ma première cigarette", "Tut, tut, tut, tut…" (a French version of "Busy Signal" by The Lollipops), "Zou bisou bisou" and "C'est bien mieux comme ça" with Les Chaussettes Noires, Eddy Mitchell's first band. In 2012, "Zou bisou bisou" was chosen for the premiere of the fifth season of the hit American TV series Mad Men. In 2020, "Tut, tut, tut, tut…" was featured in the Netflix series The Queen's Gambit.

In 1963, Serge Gainsbourg wrote for Hills his first duet for a yé-yé singer, "Une petite tasse d'anxiété", which they sang together on the French TV show Teuf Teuf.

In 1965, she signed to the AZ record label run by the radio station Europe 1 and issued an EP that included "Rentre sans moi", a French cover of the Zombies' "Leave Me Be"; and her self-penned "Rien n'est changé".

In 2008, Hills' self-penned song "Qui a su" was chosen for Jean-François Richet's film Mesrine Part One: Killer Instinct with Vincent Cassel.

At the close of her recording career, Hills returned to England and film, appearing in Michelangelo Antonioni's first English language film Blowup (1966), starring David Hemmings, with whom her character and that of Jane Birkin shared an energetic romp. Blowup won the Grand Prix at the 1967 Cannes Film Festival. Next came a play by David Storey at The Royal Court Theatre, The Restoration of Arnold Middleton, director Robert Kidd, followed by the film version of John Osborne's play Inadmissible Evidence (1968), directed by Anthony Page, in which she plays the part of Joy. Hills appears in writer James Salter's only film as a director, the mystery romance Three (1969). Hills also starred as Alison in The Owl Service (1969), a television adaptation of the Alan Garner novel. In 1970, Georges Franju chose her to play the part of Albine opposite Francis Huster in The Demise of Father Mouret (La Faute de l'Abbé Mouret), adapted from a novel by Émile Zola. Other film appearances followed, including a cameo in Stanley Kubrick's A Clockwork Orange (1971), in which Hills played the blonde one of two girls picked up in a record shop by Alex (Malcolm McDowell). She replaced Marianne Faithfull in the 1972 horror Demons of the Mind for Hammer Film Productions.

In 1972, Hills decided to stop making films. She moved to New York to work as a book and magazine illustrator. Her first book cover was Alice Munro's Lives of Girls and Women; her last book cover was for Alice Walker's The Color Purple, published by Washington Press.

== Personal life ==
Hills now lives in Britain and the US, and is married to Stewart Young, who has managed AC/DC, Emerson, Lake & Palmer, Cyndi Lauper, Foreigner, Billy Squier, Scorpions and Zucchero.

== Filmography ==
- Les Liaisons dangereuses (1959) – Une amie de Cécile
- Beat Girl (1960) – Jennifer Linden
- Tales of Paris (1962) – Theodora (segment "Sophie")
- Golden Goddess of Rio Beni (1964) – Aloa
- Lana, Queen of the Amazons (1964) – (uncredited)
- Blowup (1966) – The Brunette
- Inadmissible Evidence (1968) – Joy
- Three (1969) – Ann
- Nana (1970) – Tina
- The Demise of Father Mouret (1970) – Albine
- A Clockwork Orange (1971) – Sonietta
- Demons of the Mind (1972) – Elizabeth
- Il mio nome è Scopone e faccio sempre cappotto (1974) – Glenda Kelly
- The Killer Wore Gloves (1974) – Peggy Foster

== Television ==
- Maigret at Bay (1969) - Nicole Prieur
- The Owl Service (1969) – Alison Bradley
- Upstairs, Downstairs (1971) – The Salesgirl
- Casanova (1971) – Caroline

== Discography ==
=== Albums ===
- 2021 LiLi (LiLi Records)

=== Singles and EPs ===
- 1960 "Cha cha stop" (Barclay Records) EP
- 1960 "Près de la cascade" (Barclay)
- 1960 "Si tu veux que je te dise" (Barclay) EP
- 1960 "Cou-couche panier" (Barclay)
- 1960 "Spécialisation" (Barclay) EP
- 1960 “Ma première cigarette” (Barclay) EP
- 1961 "Jean-Lou" (Barclay) EP
- 1961 "Tu peux" (Barclay)
- 1961 "Zou bisou bisou" (Barclay) EP
- 1962 "En dansant le twist" (Barclay) EP
- 1962 "Musique du film Les Parisiennes" (Barclay) EP
- 1963 "Tu mens" (Barclay) EP
- 1965 "Qui a su" (Barclay) EP
- 1965 "Rien n'est changé" (AZ Records) EP
- 1965 "Look at them" (Vogue Records)
- 2018 "Nefer~titi" (LiLi Records)
- 2018 "Blue Dress" (LiLi Records)
- 2022 "Mary's Soldiers featuring Olivier Mellano" (LiLi Records)
