= The Rolling Stones American Tour 1966 =

1966 concert tour by the Rolling Stones

- Continental tour by the Rolling Stones
- Poster to the first concert in Lynn
- Location: North America
- Associated album: Aftermath
- Start date: 24 June 1966
- End date: 28 July 1966
- No. of shows: 32

the Rolling Stones concert chronology
- European Tour 1966; American Tour 1966; British Tour 1966

The Rolling Stones' 1966 American Tour was a concert tour by the band. The tour commenced on June 24 and concluded on July 28, 1966. Two weeks prior to the start of the tour, Mick Jagger collapsed from "nervous exhaustion" and was hospitalized. On this tour, the band supported their album Aftermath. The last gig of the tour in Honolulu, Hawaii was broadcast on Hawaiian radio station KPOI-FM.

== The Rolling Stones ==
- Mick Jagger – lead vocals, harmonica, percussion
- Keith Richards – guitar, backing vocals
- Brian Jones – guitar, harmonica, electric dulcimer, organ, backing vocals
- Bill Wyman – bass guitar, backing vocals
- Charlie Watts – drums

== Tour set list ==
Songs performed include:

- Not Fade Away
- The Last Time
- Paint It Black
- Under My Thumb
- Stupid Girl
- Time Is On My Side
- Lady Jane
- Play With Fire
- Doncha Bother Me
- The Spider And The Fly
- Mothers Little Helper
- Get Off Of My Cloud
- 19th Nervous Breakdown
- (I Can't Get No) Satisfaction

== Tour dates ==
Date	City	Country	Venue
24 June 1966	Lynn	United States	Manning Bowl
25 June 1966	Cleveland	United States	Cleveland Arena
25 June 1966	Pittsburgh	United States	Civic Arena
26 June 1966	Washington, D.C.	United States	Washington Coliseum
26 June 1966	Baltimore	United States	Baltimore Civic Center
27 June 1966	Hartford	United States	Dillon Stadium
28 June 1966	Buffalo	United States	Buffalo Memorial Auditorium
29 June 1966	Toronto	Canada	Maple Leaf Gardens
30 June 1966	Montreal	Canada	Montreal Forum
1 July 1966; 2 shows	Atlantic City	United States	Marine Ballroom, Steel Pier
2 July 1966	New York City	United States	Forest Hills Tennis Stadium; Music Festival
3 July 1966; 2 shows	Asbury Park	United States	Asbury Park Convention Hall
4 July 1966	Virginia Beach	United States	Virginia Beach Civic Center (The Dome)
6 July 1966	Syracuse	United States	Onondaga County War Memorial
8 July 1966	Detroit	United States	Cobo Hall
9 July 1966	Indianapolis	United States	Indiana State Fair Coliseum
10 July 1966	Chicago	United States	Arie Crown Theater
11 July 1966	Houston	United States	Sam Houston Coliseum
12 July 1966	St. Louis	United States	Kiel Auditorium
14 July 1966	Winnipeg	Canada	Winnipeg Arena
15 July 1966	Omaha	United States	Omaha Civic Auditorium
19 July 1966	Vancouver	Canada	PNE Forum
20 July 1966	Seattle	United States	Seattle Center Coliseum
21 July 1966	Portland	United States	Memorial Coliseum
22 July 1966; 2 shows	Sacramento	United States	Memorial Auditorium
23 July 1966	Salt Lake City	United States	Davis County Lagoon
24 July 1966	San Bernardino	United States	Swing Auditorium
24 July 1966	Bakersfield	United States	Civic Auditorium
25 July 1966	Los Angeles	United States	Hollywood Bowl
26 July 1966	Daly City	United States	Cow Palace
28 July 1966	Honolulu	United States	Hawaiʻi International Center

It has been mistakenly believed the group played two shows in Bakersfield, CA on July 24 but in fact, they had an afternoon show in San Bernardino followed by an evening show in Bakersfield.

Hartford set list:

1. Intro / "Not Fade Away"
2. "The Last Time"
3. "Paint It, Black"
4. "Lady Jane"
5. "Mother's Little Helper"
6. "Get Off Of My Cloud"
7. "19th Nervous Breakdown"
8. "(I Can't Get No) Satisfaction"

== References in popular culture ==
- The show at Forest Hills Tennis Stadium in New York provided the setting for a number of scenes in an episode of US TV drama Mad Men, entitled Tea Leaves.
