= List of Mad Men episodes =

Mad Men is an American period drama television series created by Matthew Weiner that premiered on the cable network AMC on July 19, 2007. The show is set primarily in the 1960s and is centered on the private and professional life of Don Draper (Jon Hamm), an enigmatic advertising executive on Madison Avenue.

During the course of the series, 92 episodes of Mad Men aired over seven seasons, between July 19, 2007, and May 17, 2015.

== Series overview ==
Season	Episodes		Originally released	
Season	Episodes		First released	Last released
1	13		July 19, 2007	October 18, 2007
2	13		July 27, 2008	October 26, 2008
3	13		August 16, 2009	November 8, 2009
4	13		July 25, 2010	October 17, 2010
5	13		March 25, 2012	June 10, 2012
6	13		April 7, 2013	June 23, 2013
7	14	7	April 13, 2014	May 25, 2014
7	14	7	April 5, 2015	May 17, 2015

== Episodes ==
=== Season 1 (2007) ===
No. overall	No. in season	Title	Directed by	Written by	Original release date	US viewers (millions)
1	1	"Smoke Gets in Your Eyes"	Alan Taylor	Matthew Weiner	July 19, 2007	1.65
2	2	"Ladies Room"	Alan Taylor	Matthew Weiner	July 26, 2007	1.04
3	3	"Marriage of Figaro"	Ed Bianchi	Tom Palmer	August 2, 2007	1.07
4	4	"New Amsterdam"	Tim Hunter	Lisa Albert	August 9, 2007	0.85
5	5	"5G"	Lesli Linka Glatter	Matthew Weiner	August 16, 2007	0.75
6	6	"Babylon"	Andrew Bernstein	Andre Jacquemetton & Maria Jacquemetton	August 23, 2007	0.81
7	7	"Red in the Face"	Tim Hunter	Bridget Bedard	August 30, 2007	1.02
8	8	"The Hobo Code"	Phil Abraham	Chris Provenzano	September 6, 2007	0.85
9	9	"Shoot"	Paul Feig	Chris Provenzano and Matthew Weiner	September 13, 2007	0.84
10	10	"Long Weekend"	Tim Hunter	Bridget Bedard and Andre Jacquemetton & Maria Jacquemetton and Matthew Weiner	September 27, 2007	0.61
11	11	"Indian Summer"	Tim Hunter	Tom Palmer and Matthew Weiner	October 4, 2007	0.68
12	12	"Nixon vs. Kennedy"	Alan Taylor	Lisa Albert & Andre Jacquemetton & Maria Jacquemetton	October 11, 2007	0.80
13	13	"The Wheel"	Matthew Weiner	Matthew Weiner and Robin Veith	October 18, 2007	0.93

=== Season 2 (2008) ===
No. overall	No. in season	Title	Directed by	Written by	Original release date	US viewers (millions)
14	1	"For Those Who Think Young"	Tim Hunter	Matthew Weiner	July 27, 2008	2.06
15	2	"Flight 1"	Andrew Bernstein	Lisa Albert and Matthew Weiner	August 3, 2008	1.33
16	3	"The Benefactor"	Lesli Linka Glatter	Matthew Weiner and Rick Cleveland	August 10, 2008	1.25
17	4	"Three Sundays"	Tim Hunter	Andre Jacquemetton & Maria Jacquemetton	August 17, 2008	1.07
18	5	"The New Girl"	Jennifer Getzinger	Robin Veith	August 24, 2008	1.47
19	6	"Maidenform"	Phil Abraham	Matthew Weiner	August 31, 2008	1.46
20	7	"The Gold Violin"	Andrew Bernstein	Jane Anderson and Andre Jacquemetton & Maria Jacquemetton and Matthew Weiner	September 7, 2008	1.67
21	8	"A Night to Remember"	Lesli Linka Glatter	Robin Veith & Matthew Weiner	September 14, 2008	1.87
22	9	"Six Month Leave"	Michael Uppendahl	Andre Jacquemetton & Maria Jacquemetton and Matthew Weiner	September 28, 2008	1.60
23	10	"The Inheritance"	Andrew Bernstein	Lisa Albert & Marti Noxon and Matthew Weiner	October 5, 2008	1.30
24	11	"The Jet Set"	Phil Abraham	Matthew Weiner	October 12, 2008	1.50
25	12	"The Mountain King"	Alan Taylor	Matthew Weiner & Robin Veith	October 19, 2008	1.40
26	13	"Meditations in an Emergency"	Matthew Weiner	Matthew Weiner & Kater Gordon	October 26, 2008	1.75

=== Season 3 (2009) ===
No. overall	No. in season	Title	Directed by	Written by	Original release date	US viewers (millions)
27	1	"Out of Town"	Phil Abraham	Matthew Weiner	August 16, 2009	2.76
28	2	"Love Among the Ruins"	Lesli Linka Glatter	Cathryn Humphris and Matthew Weiner	August 23, 2009	1.90
29	3	"My Old Kentucky Home"	Jennifer Getzinger	Dahvi Waller and Matthew Weiner	August 30, 2009	1.61
30	4	"The Arrangements"	Michael Uppendahl	Andrew Colville and Matthew Weiner	September 6, 2009	1.51
31	5	"The Fog"	Phil Abraham	Kater Gordon	September 13, 2009	1.75
32	6	"Guy Walks Into an Advertising Agency"	Lesli Linka Glatter	Robin Veith and Matthew Weiner	September 20, 2009	1.57
33	7	"Seven Twenty Three"	Daisy von Scherler Mayer	Andre Jacquemetton & Maria Jacquemetton and Matthew Weiner	September 27, 2009	1.73
34	8	"Souvenir"	Phil Abraham	Lisa Albert and Matthew Weiner	October 4, 2009	1.91
35	9	"Wee Small Hours"	Scott Hornbacher	Dahvi Waller and Matthew Weiner	October 11, 2009	1.53
36	10	"The Color Blue"	Michael Uppendahl	Kater Gordon and Matthew Weiner	October 18, 2009	1.61
37	11	"The Gypsy and the Hobo"	Jennifer Getzinger	Marti Noxon & Cathryn Humphris and Matthew Weiner	October 25, 2009	1.72
38	12	"The Grown-Ups"	Barbet Schroeder	Brett Johnson and Matthew Weiner	November 1, 2009	1.78
39	13	"Shut the Door. Have a Seat."	Matthew Weiner	Matthew Weiner & Erin Levy	November 8, 2009	2.32

=== Season 4 (2010) ===
No. overall	No. in season	Title	Directed by	Written by	Original release date	US viewers (millions)
40	1	"Public Relations"	Phil Abraham	Matthew Weiner	July 25, 2010	2.92
41	2	"Christmas Comes But Once a Year"	Michael Uppendahl	Tracy McMillan and Matthew Weiner	August 1, 2010	2.47
42	3	"The Good News"	Jennifer Getzinger	Jonathan Abrahams and Matthew Weiner	August 8, 2010	2.22
43	4	"The Rejected"	John Slattery	Keith Huff and Matthew Weiner	August 15, 2010	2.05
44	5	"The Chrysanthemum and the Sword"	Lesli Linka Glatter	Erin Levy	August 22, 2010	2.19
45	6	"Waldorf Stories"	Scott Hornbacher	Brett Johnson and Matthew Weiner	August 29, 2010	2.04
46	7	"The Suitcase"	Jennifer Getzinger	Matthew Weiner	September 5, 2010	2.17
47	8	"The Summer Man"	Phil Abraham	Lisa Albert & Janet Leahy and Matthew Weiner	September 12, 2010	2.31
48	9	"The Beautiful Girls"	Michael Uppendahl	Dahvi Waller and Matthew Weiner	September 19, 2010	2.30
49	10	"Hands and Knees"	Lynn Shelton	Jonathan Abrahams and Matthew Weiner	September 26, 2010	2.12
50	11	"Chinese Wall"	Phil Abraham	Erin Levy	October 3, 2010	2.06
51	12	"Blowing Smoke"	John Slattery	Andre Jacquemetton & Maria Jacquemetton	October 10, 2010	2.23
52	13	"Tomorrowland"	Matthew Weiner	Jonathan Igla and Matthew Weiner	October 17, 2010	2.44

=== Season 5 (2012) ===
No. overall	No. in season	Title	Directed by	Written by	Original release date	US viewers (millions)
53	1	"A Little Kiss"	Jennifer Getzinger	Matthew Weiner	March 25, 2012	3.54
54	2	"A Little Kiss"	Jennifer Getzinger	Matthew Weiner	March 25, 2012	3.54
55	3	"Tea Leaves"	Jon Hamm	Erin Levy and Matthew Weiner	April 1, 2012	2.94
56	4	"Mystery Date"	Matt Shakman	Victor Levin and Matthew Weiner	April 8, 2012	2.75
57	5	"Signal 30"	John Slattery	Frank Pierson and Matthew Weiner	April 15, 2012	2.69
58	6	"Far Away Places"	Scott Hornbacher	Semi Chellas and Matthew Weiner	April 22, 2012	2.66
59	7	"At the Codfish Ball"	Michael Uppendahl	Jonathan Igla	April 29, 2012	2.31
60	8	"Lady Lazarus"	Phil Abraham	Matthew Weiner	May 6, 2012	2.29
61	9	"Dark Shadows"	Scott Hornbacher	Erin Levy	May 13, 2012	2.13
62	10	"Christmas Waltz"	Michael Uppendahl	Victor Levin and Matthew Weiner	May 20, 2012	1.92
63	11	"The Other Woman"	Phil Abraham	Semi Chellas and Matthew Weiner	May 27, 2012	2.07
64	12	"Commissions and Fees"	Christopher Manley	Andre Jacquemetton & Maria Jacquemetton	June 3, 2012	2.41
65	13	"The Phantom"	Matthew Weiner	Jonathan Igla and Matthew Weiner	June 10, 2012	2.70

=== Season 6 (2013) ===
No. overall	No. in season	Title	Directed by	Written by	Original release date	US viewers (millions)
66	1	"The Doorway"	Scott Hornbacher	Matthew Weiner	April 7, 2013	3.37
67	2	"The Doorway"	Scott Hornbacher	Matthew Weiner	April 7, 2013	3.37
68	3	"Collaborators"	Jon Hamm	Jonathan Igla and Matthew Weiner	April 14, 2013	2.66
69	4	"To Have and to Hold"	Michael Uppendahl	Erin Levy	April 21, 2013	2.40
70	5	"The Flood"	Christopher Manley	Tom Smuts and Matthew Weiner	April 28, 2013	2.38
71	6	"For Immediate Release"	Jennifer Getzinger	Matthew Weiner	May 5, 2013	2.45
72	7	"Man with a Plan"	John Slattery	Semi Chellas and Matthew Weiner	May 12, 2013	2.36
73	8	"The Crash"	Michael Uppendahl	Jason Grote and Matthew Weiner	May 19, 2013	2.16
74	9	"The Better Half"	Phil Abraham	Erin Levy and Matthew Weiner	May 26, 2013	1.88
75	10	"A Tale of Two Cities"	John Slattery	Janet Leahy and Matthew Weiner	June 2, 2013	2.45
76	11	"Favors"	Jennifer Getzinger	Semi Chellas and Matthew Weiner	June 9, 2013	2.17
77	12	"The Quality of Mercy"	Phil Abraham	Andre Jacquemetton & Maria Jacquemetton	June 16, 2013	2.06
78	13	"In Care Of"	Matthew Weiner	Carly Wray and Matthew Weiner	June 23, 2013	2.69

=== Season 7 (2014–15) ===
No. overall	No. in season	Title	Directed by	Written by	Original release date	US viewers (millions)
Part 1: The Beginning
79	1	"Time Zones"	Scott Hornbacher	Matthew Weiner	April 13, 2014	2.27
80	2	"A Day's Work"	Michael Uppendahl	Jonathan Igla and Matthew Weiner	April 20, 2014	1.89
81	3	"Field Trip"	Christopher Manley	Heather Jeng Bladt and Matthew Weiner	April 27, 2014	2.02
82	4	"The Monolith"	Scott Hornbacher	Erin Levy	May 4, 2014	2.14
83	5	"The Runaways"	Christopher Manley	David Iserson and Matthew Weiner	May 11, 2014	1.86
84	6	"The Strategy"	Phil Abraham	Semi Chellas	May 18, 2014	1.93
85	7	"Waterloo"	Matthew Weiner	Carly Wray and Matthew Weiner	May 25, 2014	1.94
Part 2: The End of an Era
86	8	"Severance"	Scott Hornbacher	Matthew Weiner	April 5, 2015	2.27
87	9	"New Business"	Michael Uppendahl	Tom Smuts and Matthew Weiner	April 12, 2015	1.97
88	10	"The Forecast"	Jennifer Getzinger	Jonathan Igla and Matthew Weiner	April 19, 2015	1.87
89	11	"Time & Life"	Jared Harris	Erin Levy and Matthew Weiner	April 26, 2015	1.77
90	12	"Lost Horizon"	Phil Abraham	Semi Chellas and Matthew Weiner	May 3, 2015	1.79
91	13	"The Milk and Honey Route"	Matthew Weiner	Carly Wray and Matthew Weiner	May 10, 2015	1.87
92	14	"Person to Person"	Matthew Weiner	Matthew Weiner	May 17, 2015	3.29

== Viewership ==
Mad Men : U.S. viewers per episode (millions)

Season	Episode number													Average
Season	1	2	3	4	5	6	7	8	9	10	11	12	13	Average
1	1.65	1.04	1.07	0.85	0.75	0.81	1.02	0.85	0.84	0.61	0.68	0.80	0.93	0.92
2	2.06	1.33	1.25	1.07	1.47	1.46	1.67	1.87	1.60	1.30	1.50	1.40	1.75	1.52
3	2.76	1.90	1.61	1.51	1.75	1.57	1.73	1.91	1.53	1.61	1.72	1.78	2.32	1.82
4	2.92	2.47	2.22	2.05	2.19	2.04	2.17	2.31	2.30	2.12	2.06	2.23	2.44	2.27
5	3.54	3.54	2.94	2.75	2.69	2.66	2.31	2.29	2.13	1.92	2.07	2.41	2.70	2.61
6	3.37	3.37	2.66	2.40	2.38	2.45	2.36	2.16	1.88	2.45	2.17	2.06	2.69	2.49
7A	2.27	1.89	2.02	2.14	1.86	1.93	1.94	–						2.01
7B	2.27	1.97	1.87	1.77	1.79	1.87	3.29	–						2.12

Audience measurement performed by Nielsen Media Research
