= Mad Men season 2 =

Season of television series

Mad Men
- Season 2
- Season 2 promotional poster
- Starring: Jon Hamm; Elisabeth Moss; Vincent Kartheiser; January Jones; Christina Hendricks; Bryan Batt; Michael Gladis; Aaron Staton; Rich Sommer; John Slattery
- No. of episodes: 13

Release
- Original network: AMC
- Original release: July 27 – October 26, 2008

Season chronology
- ← Previous; Season 1 Next → Season 3

The second season of the American television drama series Mad Men premiered on July 27, 2008, and concluded on October 26, 2008. It consisted of thirteen episodes, each running approximately 48 minutes in length. AMC broadcast the second season on Sundays at 10:00 pm in the United States; it would occupy in this timeslot for the remainder of its run.

Season two takes place from February 14 to October 24, 1962, culminating with the Cuban Missile Crisis. It expands on Peggy's rise in the workplace and the marital strife between Don and Betty Draper as Don's infidelities further intrude on his family life. The second season also introduces an unknown acquaintance, with whom Don is corresponding by letter in secret.

The second season of Mad Men was met with critical acclaim: it was honored with the Primetime Emmy Award for Outstanding Drama Series, the Golden Globe Award for Best Drama Series, and recognition by the American Film Institute, all for the second year in a row. According to Metacritic's annual aggregate of year-end lists published by prominent television critics, Mad Men was the most mentioned show of 2008, with more first-place mentions than any other show that year as well.

== Cast ==
=== Main cast ===
- Jon Hamm as Don Draper
- Elisabeth Moss as Peggy Olson
- Vincent Kartheiser as Pete Campbell
- January Jones as Betty Draper
- Christina Hendricks as Joan Holloway
- Bryan Batt as Salvatore Romano
- Michael Gladis as Paul Kinsey
- Aaron Staton as Ken Cosgrove
- Rich Sommer as Harry Crane
- John Slattery as Roger Sterling

=== Recurring cast ===
- Kiernan Shipka as Sally Draper
- Mark Moses as Herman "Duck" Phillips
- Alison Brie as Trudy Campbell
- Julie McNiven as Hildy
- Robert Morse as Bert Cooper
- Joel Murray as Freddy Rumsen
- Deborah Lacey as Carla
- Peyton List as Jane Siegel
- Melinda McGraw as Bobbie Barrett
- Patrick Fischler as Jimmy Barrett
- Crista Flanagan as Lois Sadler
- Myra Turley as Katherine Olson
- Gabriel Mann as Arthur Case
- Audrey Wasilewski as Anita Olson Respola
- Missy Yager as Sarah Beth Carson
- Talia Balsam as Mona Sterling
- Patrick Cavanaugh as "Smitty" Smith
- Sarah Drew as Kitty Romano
- Anne Dudek as Francine Hanson
- Edin Gali as Kurt Smith
- Colin Hanks as Father Gill
- Melinda Page Hamilton as Anna Draper
- Samuel Page as Greg Harris
- Laura Regan as Jennifer Crane
- Charles Shaughnessy as St. John Powell

=== Guest stars ===
- Alexa Alemanni as Allison
- Ryan Cutrona as Gene Hofstadt
- Joe O'Connor as Tom Vogel
- Elizabeth Rice as Margaret Sterling
- Maggie Siff as Rachel Menken
- Darby Stanchfield as Helen Bishop
- Marten Holden Weiner as Glen Bishop

== Plot ==
Fifteen months after the events of season one, Don and Betty's marriage seems to be on sturdier footing, while Peggy has returned to work. Sterling Cooper travels further into the "Pepsi Generation" as signing youth talent becomes a priority at the behest of Duck Phillips, Don's choice as head of accounts from the previous year. Despite Don's objections, Duck convinces the firm to try and sign his old client, American Airlines, after the airline publicly announces a shift in marketing. However, The American Airlines pitch fails, significantly harming Duck's reputation at the firm and creating palpable tension with Don.

Joan is outed to her coworkers as being 31 years old, and she hurriedly becomes engaged to egotistical and frustrated medical resident Greg Harris. Too proud to admit to his own insecurities regarding his career, Greg takes full advantage of being the only man Joan is willing to be submissive to; this culminates in him raping Joan inside Don's office. In spite of this, Joan remains with her fiancé. Meanwhile, Roger proposes to Jane Siegel, Don's secretary, and ends his marriage with Mona, causing personal and financial pressures.

Don has to step in to handle the obnoxious antics of his talent, comedian Jimmy Barrett, and ends up having an extramarital affair with Barrett's wife, Bobbie. After Don discovers that Bobbie and other women around town have been discussing Don's sexual prowess, Don leaves her tied to a hotel bed in her lingerie. Later, a resentful Jimmy tells Betty about the affair, eventually causing her to kick Don out of the family home. During his exile from home, Don takes a business trip to California and disappears, his whereabouts unknown to his wife, children and business associates. Don ends up meeting with Anna Draper, the wife of the original Don Draper, whom he has set up in a bungalow in San Pedro. Anna comforts Don about his current marital troubles and identity crisis.

While Don is away, Roger bluntly informs Duck that a partnership is not forthcoming. Duck then meets with executives from his former London firm, Putnam, Powell & Lowe (PPL), and informs them of Sterling Cooper's vulnerable position; he pitches a buyout, with Duck being appointed President. PPL then offers the buyout to Bert and Roger, and they accept the buyout in Don's absence. Duck informs Pete that he plans to either have Don follow his lead or be sent out the door, using the non-compete clause in Don's contract as leverage.

In Don's absence, Peggy brings in the Popsicle account and uses this as leverage to acquire her own office; Pete is impressed by this maneuver and his romantic interests in Peggy are rekindled. Although married to Trudy, Pete professes his love for Peggy, who finally confesses that he had gotten her pregnant and she had put their child up for adoption. The revelation is a particularly galling development for Pete, since he and Trudy are so far unable to conceive. When Don returns, Pete informs Don of Duck's plans. At the initial meeting with the lead PPL executives, Don informs them that he would not work under Duck's vision of the agency, and reveals that he is not under any contract to the agency. Duck loses his temper, putting his promotion after the merger in question.

Betty learns from her doctor that she is expecting another child, and she has sex with a stranger at a local bar. She returns home to find a letter from Don, begging her to let him come home. The season closes as Betty informs him of their new child; they hold hands in the kitchen.

== Episodes ==
No. overall	No. in season	Title	Directed by	Written by	Original release date	US viewers (millions)
14	1	"For Those Who Think Young"	Tim Hunter	Matthew Weiner	July 27, 2008	2.06
On Valentine's Day 1962, Don and Betty plan a romantic evening in New York, but the evening ends with Don's inability to satisfy Betty. Roger has recovered from his heart attack and is back at Sterling Cooper, while Peggy returns to work following a three-month break, leaving her colleagues to speculate over her absence and weight loss. After Peggy humiliates Don's new secretary Lois, Joan places a new copy machine in Peggy's office, making it crowded with secretaries. Pete gives Trudy a box of Schrafft's chocolates for Valentine's Day, but they have an awkward discussion over Trudy's frustration in not getting pregnant yet. Following Duck's plan to acquire an airline business, Don and the creative team discuss pitching to Mohawk Airlines; Don advises the staff to focus on the feeling of adventure and escape. Seeing the potential of having young staff members on board, Duck presses Don to hire younger employees, leading Don to hire two young copywriters: Kurt and Smitty Smith. At the end of the episode, Don quotes a poem from Meditations in an Emergency and mails the book to an unknown recipient with a note, stating "Made me think of you. –D."
15	2	"Flight 1"	Andrew Bernstein	Lisa Albert and Matthew Weiner	August 3, 2008	1.33
Pete learns from his brother, Bud, that their father has died in the American Airlines Flight 1 crash. Bud tells Pete their father was broke, but they do not tell this to their mother. Copywriter Paul Kinsey hosts a party for the Sterling Cooper staff in his New Jersey apartment, during which Joan makes condescending remarks about Paul's African-American girlfriend Sheila. In response, Paul makes a photocopy of Joan's driver's license and posts it on the office bulletin board, revealing to everyone that Joan is 31. Peggy visits her mother and sister in Brooklyn; Peggy's mother tries to convince her to attend Mass on Sundays with them, but she refuses. Roger, Duck and Bert speculate that American Airlines will hire a new ad agency to rebuild their public image, and want to position Sterling Cooper for the opportunity. Don objects, since the conflict of interest would require them to dump Mohawk Airlines. Nevertheless, Pete shows up at Duck's meeting with American Airlines and reveals his father's death, using it to guilt the executive into considering Sterling Cooper, thus forcing Don to drop the Mohawk Airlines account.
16	3	"The Benefactor"	Lesli Linka Glatter	Matthew Weiner and Rick Cleveland	August 10, 2008	1.25
During a commercial shoot for Utz Potato Chips, crude comedian Jimmy Barrett humiliates Mrs. Schilling, the heavyset owner of Utz. Forced to smooth things over with the company, Don meets with Jimmy's wife Bobbie to discuss what will induce Jimmy to apologize to Mrs. Schilling. He later offers her a ride, and the two get stuck in a hailstorm; Bobbie suddenly kisses Don. To placate the upset clients, Don arranges a dinner with the Barretts and the Schillings; Don forcefully seduces Bobbie and threatens to ruin Jimmy if he doesn't make amends, after which Bobbie directs Jimmy to personally apologize to the Schillings. Betty, having taken up horseback riding as a hobby, rebuffs the flirtations of Arthur Case, another rider. Harry Crane accidentally receives Ken's paycheck, and after seeing how much Ken makes, feels he deserves to make more money. He champions a controversial episode of The Defenders about an abortion, sensing an opportunity in sponsoring the show, but keeps the subject matter a secret from his pregnant wife. Harry later puts to Roger that he be made the Head of Television for Sterling Cooper and requests a raise in salary, which he is ultimately granted.
17	4	"Three Sundays"	Tim Hunter	Andre Jacquemetton & Maria Jacquemetton	August 17, 2008	1.07
As Sterling Cooper prepares for their meeting with American Airlines, Duck reveals that their client contact has been fired, essentially destroying their chances of landing the account. While attending a Passion Sunday service, Peggy bonds with the parish's new priest Father Gill, who asks for her advice on delivering the upcoming Palm Sunday sermon. Jealous that Father Gill has taken a liking to Peggy, Peggy's sister Anita privately tells Father Gill over confession that Peggy had an illegitimate child. Later, during the parish's Easter egg hunt, Father Gill gives an Easter egg to Peggy and tells her to give it to "the little one," stunning her. Roger and his wife Mona attempt to convince their daughter Margaret to throw an elaborate wedding. Roger later has sex with Vicky, a call girl whom he met through Ken and Pete. Betty and Don quarrel over disciplining their son Bobby; Betty urges Don to hit Bobby, and expresses her anger that all of the punishing of the children must fall on her. Don reveals the abuse he suffered as a child to Betty for the first time; Betty is stunned and consoles him.
18	5	"The New Girl"	Jennifer Getzinger	Robin Veith	August 24, 2008	1.47
Joan hires a new secretary named Jane Siegel, who begins working for Don, while Roger confronts Joan about her recent engagement. Pete and Trudy meet with a fertility specialist, as they are having difficulty conceiving a child, and they discover that Pete is not infertile. Don continues his affair with Bobbie, but the two get in a car accident during a drive to the beach when Bobbie distracts Don with a kiss. Don fails a sobriety test and is unable to pay his fine, forcing Peggy to bail them out and cover up the incident. Don tells Betty that the combination of booze and his prescribed pills for high blood pressure may have contributed to the accident. Meanwhile, Bobbie stays with Peggy to hide her black eye from her husband. In the process, Bobbie tells Peggy that she will not advance in her career until she starts treating Don as an equal. Flashbacks depict Peggy's short stay in the hospital after giving birth; Don visits Peggy and advises her to do "whatever they say" to get released, encouraging her to move forward with her career.
19	6	"Maidenform"	Phil Abraham	Matthew Weiner	August 31, 2008	1.46
Duck informs Don that their client, Playtex, wants Sterling Cooper to create a new marketing campaign for the company, akin to the "dream" campaign of their competitor Maidenform. Peggy is disappointed when she discovers that her co-workers are not including her in their informal business outings and confides in Joan, who advises her to "learn to speak the language" and stop dressing like a little girl. Later, Peggy crashes the creative team's meeting with Playtex executives at a strip club, surprising her co-workers by wearing a suggestive gown. Don discovers that Bobbie has been gossiping about his sexual reputation to other women. Annoyed, Don ties Bobbie's wrists up to the bed during a sexual encounter and then leaves. Duck is visited by his estranged family and their family dog, Chauncey; Duck learns from his children that their mother is getting remarried, and that he has been made to take care of the dog. Sad and frustrated by the distant relationship he has with his family, Duck contemplates drinking again and eventually abandons Chauncey outside the office.
20	7	"The Gold Violin"	Andrew Bernstein	Jane Anderson and Andre Jacquemetton & Maria Jacquemetton and Matthew Weiner	September 7, 2008	1.67
Don's success leads to the purchase of a new car. The new piece of art in Bert's office inspires the curiosity of several Sterling Cooper employees; Jane allows Ken, Sal, and Harry to view the painting despite not being allowed in Bert's office. Jane is fired by Joan for her part in the incident, but Jane seeks help from Roger, who steps in to save her job. Sal is impressed by Ken's artistic interpretation of Bert's painting and invites him over for Sunday dinner to discuss Ken's new short story; Sal's wife, Kitty, feels left out and breaks down in tears, accusing Sal of being distant. Duck feels unappreciated when Don gets all the credit for landing a new account they worked on together. Jimmy invites Betty and Don to a party celebrating ABC's acquisition of his TV pilot. During the party, Jimmy informs Betty about his suspicion that Don and Bobbie had an affair, causing Betty to storm off. Jimmy then confronts Don, lambasting him for pursuing an affair with his wife.
21	8	"A Night to Remember"	Lesli Linka Glatter	Robin Veith & Matthew Weiner	September 14, 2008	1.87
Father Gill seeks Peggy's help in promoting a church dance due to her expertise in the copywriting field. However, the organizers deem Peggy's ideas too controversial, and Peggy confronts Father Gill for not backing her up in front of the church committee. Joan helps Harry out with reading television scripts for his job, checking that there are no conflicts of interest between the shows and the products advertised during them. She enjoys the work, finding new fulfillment and growth in her career, but Harry decides to hire an inexperienced man to take over the role full-time, saddening Joan. Betty helps Don set up a dinner party for the Heineken beer account, but is upset when she becomes the butt of a joke during the dinner. After the party, Betty lambasts Don for embarrassing her and reveals that she knows about his affair with Bobbie; Don vehemently denies it and accuses Jimmy of lying, but Betty remains unconvinced. The next day, Betty sees an Utz commercial featuring Jimmy on television. Reminded of her instincts, Betty calls Don at work and instructs him not to come home.
22	9	"Six Month Leave"	Michael Uppendahl	Andre Jacquemetton & Maria Jacquemetton and Matthew Weiner	September 28, 2008	1.60
The death of Marilyn Monroe saddens many of the secretaries in the office. Trying to pull herself out of her depression, Betty goes to the stables and invites Arthur to have lunch with her and her married rider friend Sarah Beth; Betty purposely does not show up to the lunch, intending to orchestrate an affair between the two. As the creative team prepares for a presentation to Samsonite executives, Freddy drunkenly wets himself and passes out before the pitch meeting, leading Pete to suggest Peggy act as Freddy's stand-in. Roger and Don fire Freddy, but decide to take him out for a final night on the town; they end up in an illegal gambling club, during which Don runs into Jimmy and punches him for telling Betty about his affair with Bobbie. Don opens up to Roger about being separated from Betty; he reveals that he feels relief, and encourages Roger to move forward in his life. The next day, Don promotes Peggy to Freddy's position. Mona arrives at the office and angrily confronts Don, revealing that Roger has left her to pursue a relationship with Jane.
23	10	"The Inheritance"	Andrew Bernstein	Lisa Albert & Marti Noxon and Matthew Weiner	October 5, 2008	1.30
Pete, who is unable to conceive a child with Trudy and is looking to adopt, runs into resistance from his mother, who does not want someone not of their bloodline as part of the family. When his mother threatens to disinherit him, Pete counters that his father spent their inheritance, forcing Bud to come clean about their mother's financial state. Paul prepares to attend an aerospace convention in California with Pete, dismaying Sheila, who had plans to register black voters in Mississippi with Paul. Despite Don and Betty's separation, they take a trip together to visit Betty's father Eugene, who has had a stroke and is in the early stages of dementia, at one point mistaking Betty for her dead mother. Although the two share an intimate encounter in her father's house, Betty tells Don they are still separated when the trip is over. Returning home, Betty discovers that Glen is living in the backyard playhouse, having run away from home; Betty calls Helen, and ends up confiding in her about potentially divorcing Don. Meanwhile, Don returns to the office and decides to replace Paul on the trip to California.
24	11	"The Jet Set"	Phil Abraham	Matthew Weiner	October 12, 2008	1.50
Don and Pete arrive in Los Angeles for the aerospace convention; Don declines the advances of a woman named Joy, but soon abandons the convention to spend a weekend with her and a group of wealthy nomads. Kurt invites Peggy to a Bob Dylan concert; when the rest of the office teases them, he candidly announces that he is gay, bemusing everyone. Sal silently listens as his colleagues make homophobic remarks about Kurt. Duck approaches Roger about being made partner, only to learn that this will not happen; in response, Duck holds a meeting with his former London firm Putnam, Powell & Lowe (PPL), where he reveals Sterling Cooper's vulnerable position and proposes a merger between the two agencies, with him being president. PPL offers to buy out Sterling Cooper, and Roger and Bert agree to give the firm five days to make an offer. Pete returns to New York without Don, whose whereabouts are unknown; at the end of the episode, Don is in Palm Springs making a call to an unknown recipient, referring to himself as Dick Whitman.
25	12	"The Mountain King"	Alan Taylor	Matthew Weiner & Robin Veith	October 19, 2008	1.40
Flashbacks depict Don meeting Anna, the widow of the man whose identity he stole, and revealing that her husband died in combat. In another flashback, Anna agrees to legally divorce Don, so that he will be able to marry Betty; Don is thankful and promises to take care of Anna financially for the remainder of her life. In the present, Don visits Anna in California and confides in her about the dissolution of his marriage. Roger, Bert, and Bert's sister Alice agree to PPL's buyout of Sterling Cooper, arguing that Don's small share of the company makes his absence irrelevant. Sarah Beth accuses Betty of encouraging her to have an affair with Arthur, but Betty coldly dismisses her. Roger agrees to give Freddy's old office to Peggy. Pete learns that Trudy has scheduled an appointment with an adoption agency and shuts it down. Pete later receives a call from his father-in-law, who is putting the Clearasil account up for review, contending that Trudy is unhappy and that Pete is "distracted" in his work. Joan introduces her fiancé Greg to the employees of Sterling Cooper. When Joan shows Greg inside Don's office, Greg forces himself onto Joan and rapes her.
26	13	"Meditations in an Emergency"	Matthew Weiner	Matthew Weiner & Kater Gordon	October 26, 2008	1.75
Don finally returns from his trip to California in the middle of the hysteria generated by the Cuban Missile Crisis, and learns from Roger that the company has been sold. Betty receives the news that she is pregnant, but before telling Don the news, she engages in a brief sexual encounter with a stranger. The office thinks Sterling Cooper is planning to open an office in Los Angeles due to the rise in television and Don's long trip there, but instead learns of the merger with Putnam, Powell & Lowe. Duck tells Pete that he's becoming head of Sterling Cooper after the merger and that he plans to undermine Don. Pete informs Don, who confronts Duck and threatens to leave the newly-merged agency; Duck, in a drunken rage, tells him to get in line or he will enforce Don's non-compete clause, which Don does not have, as he never signed a contract with Sterling Cooper; Duck is ultimately fired, with PPL admitting he has a drinking problem. Pete invites Peggy for a drink and tells her he loves her; in response, Peggy informs him that he fathered a child with her, and that she gave it away for adoption. Betty asks Don to return home, and reveals that she is pregnant.

== Production ==
=== Crew ===
Series creator Matthew Weiner also served as showrunner and executive producer, and is credited as a writer on 11 of the 13 episodes of the season. Lisa Albert was promoted to supervising producer and wrote two episodes. Writing team Andre Jacquemetton and Maria Jacquemetton were promoted to supervising producers and wrote three episodes. Robin Veith was promoted to staff writer and wrote three episodes. Kater Gordon was promoted to staff writer and co-wrote her first episode of the series. Joining the writing staff in the second season were consulting producers Rick Cleveland, Jane Anderson, and Marti Noxon, who each wrote an episode. Other producers were unit production manager Dwayne Shattuck, who was promoted to co-producer; Blake McCormick, who was promoted to producer; and Scott Hornbacher, who was promoted to co-executive producer.

Directors of multiple episodes for the season included Andrew Bernstein who directed three episodes, and Lesli Linka Glatter, Tim Hunter, and Phil Abraham, who each directed two. The remaining episodes were directed by Michael Uppendahl, script supervisor Jennifer Getzinger, who made her television directorial debut, and series creator Matthew Weiner, who directs each season finale.

== Reception ==
=== Critical reception ===
The second season of Mad Men has received critical acclaim. Review aggregator Rotten Tomatoes reports that 100% of 27 critics have given the season a positive review with an average score of 9.3/10. The site's consensus is: "The second season of Mad Men delves deeper into the personal lives of its characters without sacrificing the show's trademark droll humor and period atmosphere." On Metacritic, the second season scored 88 out of 100 based on 20 reviews, indicating universal acclaim.

Robert Bianco of USA Today wrote an extremely positive review, giving the second season four out of four stars and commenting that the series was at the "height of its powers" and "terrifically acted and gorgeously produced, this is a show that's both funny and frightening, that can simultaneously make you miss the '60s and feel blessed that they're gone." Bianco concluded, "if this is the future of TV, the future's looking good." The New York Times said Mad Men "is more than a period piece. It’s a sleek, hard-boiled drama with a soft, satirical core." TIME said the series was better than other sixties-set series because the "characters do not stand in for Important Social Milestones. The changes in society serve to illustrate the characters, not the other way around. Don is right. In the end, no one is nostalgic for fashions or fads or furniture. We're nostalgic for people. And that, for all its sexy Eames-era perfection, is what Mad Men gives us."

The Pittsburgh Post-Gazette opined that the series was the "sophisticated heir" to The Sopranos and observed the historical authenticity of the series extends "to the characters, their reactions, their choices and the ways in which they relate to one another. It's a Mad Men hallmark that sets the show head and shoulders above its prime-time peers." Tim Goodman of the San Francisco Chronicle said the series "reaffirm[s] its place in the upper echelon of television dramas. The writing is a real thing of beauty - from the aforementioned nuance to searing workplace witticisms and pitch-perfect tone from a multitude of characters. You can't overstate how accomplished Mad Men is at understanding the vagaries of dialogue among disparate characters." Salon.com noted that the time period almost acts as an antagonist for the characters and that "what sets this drama apart from others is the complexity and depth of its themes beyond the obvious."

=== Accolades ===
The second season of Mad Men was recognized with many award nominations and wins. At the 61st Primetime Emmy Awards, Mad Men won Outstanding Drama Series and Outstanding Writing in a Drama Series (Matthew Weiner and Kater Gordon for "Meditations in an Emergency"), both for the second year in a row.

Jon Hamm was nominated for Outstanding Lead Actor in a Drama Series, while John Slattery was nominated for Outstanding Supporting Actor in a Drama Series, both for the second year in a row. Elisabeth Moss received an Emmy nomination for Outstanding Lead Actress in a Drama Series for the first time. The series also received three additional nominations for Outstanding Writing in a Drama Series (Robin Veith and Matthew Weiner for "A Night to Remember"; Andre Jacquemetton, Maria Jacquemetton and Matthew Weiner for "Six Month Leave"; and Matthew Weiner for "The Jet Set"). Phil Abraham received an Outstanding Directing for a Drama Series nomination for directing "The Jet Set".

The series was recognized by the American Film Institute as one of the ten greatest television achievements for 2008. AFI commented that the series unveiled "a work of art each week" and that the series became more of an ensemble piece in the second season, though still anchored by Jon Hamm's performance as 'Don Draper'.

The series won Best Television Drama Series at the 66th Golden Globe Awards for the second year in a row. Jon Hamm and January Jones were also nominated for Best Actor – Television Series Drama and Best Actress – Television Series Drama, respectively. Season two was also honored at the 25th TCA Awards with the Outstanding Achievement in Drama award.

The series also won a Casting Society of America Artios Award for Outstanding Casting in a Television Series, Drama. The second season won Best Dramatic Series at the 2008 Writers Guild of America Awards. The cast of Mad Men won Outstanding Performance by an Ensemble in a Drama Series at the 15th Screen Actors Guild Awards, while Jon Hamm and Elisabeth Moss were nominated for Outstanding Performance by a Male Actor in a Drama Series and Outstanding Performance by a Female Actor in a Drama Series.
