= Maidenform (Mad Men) =

- Mad Men episode
- Episode no.: Season 2 Episode 6
- Directed by: Phil Abraham
- Written by: Matthew Weiner
- Original air date: August 31, 2008

Guest appearances
- Joel Murray as Freddy Rumsen; Mark Moses as Herman "Duck" Phillips; Alison Brie as Trudy Campbell; Gabriel Mann as Arthur Case; Melinda McGraw as Bobbie Barrett; Peyton List as Jane Siegel; Rich Hutchman as Bud Campbell; Matt McKenzie as Crab Colson; Edmund L. Shaff as Chester Rockingham; Peter Jason as Len McKenzie; Alexandra Paul as Pauline Phillips; Gina DeVivo as Patricia Phillips

Episode chronology
← Previous "The New Girl"	Next → "The Gold Violin"
- Mad Men season 2

"Maidenform" is the sixth episode in the second season of the American television drama series Mad Men. It was written by Matthew Weiner and directed by Phil Abraham. The episode originally aired on the AMC channel in the United States on August 31, 2008.

== Plot ==
Duck tells Don that their client Playtex wants a campaign like Maidenform's "dream" ads, prompting Peggy, Salvatore, Ken, Paul, and Freddie to brainstorm ideas. Duck is visited by his ex-wife and children, who reveal she is remarrying and leaving him their dog. Feeling replaced and disconnected from his family, Duck abandons the dog on the street.

Don and Betty attend a country club event on Memorial Day in 1962; the next morning, Betty models a new bikini bought at the club, and Don criticizes her for looking "desperate". Meanwhile, Peggy learns the Sterling Cooper team had an informal after-hours meeting about the Playtex campaign, where Paul proposes comparing women to Jackie Kennedy or Marilyn Monroe. Peggy rejects the idea and is dismissed as "like Gertrude Stein or Irene Dunne".

Later, Peggy asks Joan why she is excluded, and Joan tells her to "learn the language" and change how she presents herself to men. After Playtex reject the campaign, the Sterling Cooper team meet Playtex at a strip club. Peggy surprises everyone by showing up and sensually sits on a Playtex executive's lap, in view of a visibly jealous Pete.

At a hotel, Bobbie reveals that women have been talking about Don's affairs and sexual activity. Don tells her to "stop talking": when she continues to mention his affairs, Don ties her to the bed and leaves. At home, Sally watches Don shave, remarking that she "won’t talk" as not to disturb Don while he is shaving. Frozen, Don asks Sally to leave and becomes upset while staring at himself in the mirror.

== Reception ==
The episode was received positively by critics at the time. Noel Murray, writing for The A.V. Club, graded the episode an A− and commented on the surprising aspects of the episode, stating, "I can't imagine a more surprising start... [and] I can't imagine a more surprising turn". He also discussed the episode's use of mirrors as a thematic device. However, he criticized Betty's depiction, saying she fits into the storyline "too neatly". Alan Sepinwall praised the episode but negatively compared it to others in the series, saying, ""Maidenform" is a less intense episode than "The New Girl," but it features a number of typically beautiful, haunting Mad Men moments".

The episode was nominated for Outstanding Single Camera Picture Editing for a Drama Series at the 61st Primetime Emmy Awards.

== Production ==
The episode was written by Matthew Weiner and directed by Phil Abraham. Weiner explained that the "Jackie vs. Marilyn" concept reflects how men categorize women, echoing the Madonna–whore complex, and emphasizing the gap between perception and reality and "how we come across to other people".

Elisabeth Moss noted that Peggy represents early working women striving for equality, with the country club scene marking Peggy's realization that she will not be accepted as "one of the boys". Weiner further highlighted themes of identity and reputation, which was explored through Don's fixed public image.

In 2019, Weiner commented on "Maidenform":

[It was] the first episode of the show where I was like, "This cannot be done on any other show". It's so psychological and about [the] idea [of], "How am I perceived by other people?" It’s thematically hammered over and over — in the ad campaign, in Don and Bobbie's relationship, Don and Sally, Betty in the bathing suit. At the time, I [thought], "Is anybody going to understand this?" [We were] telling a story that [considers] Don's busted romance, conflict in the office, and Peggy trying to get ahead. But what it really is, "I look in the mirror and I don’t like what I see. What do other people see?".
