= Meditations in an Emergency =

1957 book of poetry by Frank O'Hara

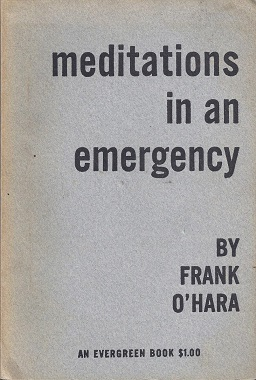
- First edition
- Author: Frank O'Hara
- Language: English
- Publisher: Grove Press
- Publication date: 1957
- ISBN: 978-0-8021-3452-3

Meditations in an Emergency is a book of poetry by American poet Frank O'Hara, first published by Grove Press in 1957. Its title poem was first printed in the November 1954 issue of Poetry: A Magazine of Verse.

The name of the book is purported to derive from English poet John Donne's prose work, Devotions upon Emergent Occasions, stemming from a joke between O'Hara and other members of the renowned New York School of poets. Critics have noted the influence of impressionism and abstract expressionism in the collection, with most of the poems detailing the theme of identity and everyday life in New York City.

The book is dedicated to painter Jane Freilicher.

== Poems ==
- To the Harbormaster
- Poem: "The eager note on my door..."
- To the Film industry in Crisis
- Poem: "At night Chinamen jump"
- Blocks
- Les Etiquette jaunes
- Aus einem April
- River
- Poem: "There I could never be a boy"
- On Rachmaninoff's Birthday
- The Hunter
- For Grace, After a Party
- On Looking at "La Grande Jatte," the Czar Wept Anew
- Romanze, or The Music Students
- The Three-Penny Opera
- A Terrestrial Cuckoo
- Jane Awake
- A Mexican Guitar
- Chez Jane
- Two Variations
- Ode
- Invincibility
- Poem in January
- Meditations in an Emergency
- For James Dean
- Sleeping on the Wing
- Radio
- On Seeing Larry Rivers' "Washington Crossing the Delaware" at the Museum of Modern Art
- For Janice and Kenneth to Voyage
- Mayakovsky

== In popular culture ==
- The book serves as a central literary motif in the second season of Mad Men (2008). The finale is titled "Meditations in an Emergency" after the collection. Show creator Matthew Weiner has noted that he originally intended Don to be reading O'Hara's Lunch Poems, but that collection had not yet been published in the episode's 1962 setting, leading him to use Meditations in an Emergency instead; the decision to have Don read aloud from the book was made at the last minute, with Weiner selecting the final poem "Mayakovsky" and finding it precisely captured Don's emotional arc for the season.
