= A Night to Remember (Mad Men) =

- Mad Men episode
- Episode no.: Season 2 Episode 8
- Directed by: Lesli Linka Glatter
- Written by: Matthew Weiner; Robin Vieth
- Original air date: September 14, 2008

Guest appearances
- Mark Moses as Herman "Duck" Phillips; Samuel Page as Greg Harris; Talia Balsam as Mona Sterling; Colin Hanks as Father John Gill; Matt McKenzie as Crab Colson; Amy Landecker as Petra Colson; Marty Ryan as Richard Hanson; Christopher Murray as Phil Mathewson

Episode chronology
← Previous "The Gold Violin"	Next → "Six Month Leave"
- Mad Men season 2

"A Night to Remember" is the eighth episode of the second season of the American television drama series Mad Men. It was written by Matthew Weiner and Robin Vieth; and was directed by Lesli Linka Glatter. The episode originally aired on September 14, 2008.

== Plot ==
At the office, Harry struggles with his workload as the new head of the television department: Joan steps in and excels at script-proofing. Despite her success, she is replaced after Roger hires external help for Harry, leaving her disappointed.

Meanwhile, Father Gill asks Peggy to design a flyer for the church's youth dance, but the committee rejects her "A Night to Remember" concept as inappropriate. When he fails to support her in a later meeting with the committee, Peggy agrees to revise it but later confronts Father Gill for his lack of support, prompting an apology. Later, Father Gill visits Sterling Cooper and urges Peggy to open up about her child, but she ultimately refuses.

Betty struggles with how to confront Don about his affair while preparing a dinner party. Fixated on making everything perfect, she becomes frustrated and breaks a damaged dining room chair. At the dinner party, Betty's "around the world" food theme is undercut when Don and Duck joke about their housewives being Heineken's primary market, embarrassing her.

Afterwards, she confronts Don, saying that Jimmy revealed Don's infidelity with Bobbie: Don denies any affair. Later, Betty goes through Don's things to find evidence, and is doubtful about Jimmy's allegation. However, an Utz commercial featuring Jimmy reignites Betty's suspicions, prompting her to tell Don not to come home. Shocked, Don remains at the office, drinking alone.

== Production ==
"A Night to Remember" was written by Matthew Weiner and Robin Veith, and was directed by Lesli Linka Glatter. In an interview with AMC, Weiner explained the episode reflects real-life incidents of when people unexpectedly reveal information or express new feelings, which make these incidents "memorable". Weiner also explained that scenes between Father Gill and Peggy mimicked a confession, with Peggy actively denying change. Jones said that Betty's mental state reflects "everything that happened" between Don and Betty, while Hamm said that Don is "torn" and that he "desperately wants this to work and yet, he's [also] genuinely unsure if he really [does]".

== Reception ==
This episode had a total of 1.87 million viewers, which is a slight decline from 2.1 million rating of the first episode of the season.

Alan Sepinwall praised Hendricks's performance in the episode, while Noel Murray, writing for The A.V. Club in 2008, praised the episode for containing moments that were concise, funny, and character defining, such as those involving Betty and Peggy. Dan Owen, from Dan's Media Digest, wrote about how the episode marked a turning point in the series, while the Chicago Tribune complimented Jones' performance as "restrained, nuanced, and detailed".
