= Six Month Leave =

- Mad Men episode
- Episode no.: Season 2 Episode 9
- Directed by: Michael Uppendahl
- Written by: Andre Jacquemetton; Maria Jacquemetton; Matthew Weiner
- Original air date: September 28, 2008
- Running time: 49 minutes

Guest appearances
- Joel Murray as Freddy Rumsen; Mark Moses as Herman "Duck" Phillips; Talia Balsam as Mona Sterling; Missy Yager as Sarah Beth; Peyton List as Jane Siegel; Gabriel Mann as Arthur Case; Patrick Fischler as Jimmy Barrett

Episode chronology
← Previous "A Night to Remember"	Next → "The Inheritance"
- Mad Men season 2

"Six Month Leave" is the ninth episode of the second season of the American period drama television series Mad Men. Written by Andre and Maria Jacquemetton and Matthew Weiner, it was directed by Michael Uppendahl. The episode originally aired on AMC in the United States on September 28, 2008.

== Plot ==
Don lives alone at the Roosevelt Hotel after being forced to leave home by Betty. Don arrives at the office and finds the secretarial staff distressed at the news of Marilyn Monroe's death. Joan, also upset, reprimands Roger for being insensitive over Monroe; Joan warns him that "we all lose someone important". Jane tells Don that Sally called the office, inquiring about his return from a "business trip". Don dismisses the matter as personal and declines to discuss it. The next day, Jane brings in spare shirts for Don.

Elsewhere, Betty is visited by Sarah Beth, who confides that she has recently developed romantic interest in Arthur. Later, Betty meets Arthur at the stables and invites him to lunch with her and Sarah Beth, where Arthur and Sarah Beth discover that Betty has arranged for them to meet alone by failing to attend. Meanwhile, Freddy, Peggy, Pete, and Sal prepare for a presentation to Samsonite, during which Freddy urinates himself and collapses. Pete suggests Peggy assume Freddy's role in the presentation. Freddy later tells Peggy that Samonsite responded favorably to her presentation.

Don is then called to Roger's office, where Roger, Duck, and Pete tell him of Freddy's incident. Roger decides that Freddy should be fired, to which Don objects: they eventually agree they will inform him over dinner that evening. Roger and Don tell Freddy he will be placed on a paid "six month leave" to address his drinking: Freddy ultimately accepts that he is unlikely to return to Sterling Cooper. The three men continue the night at an illegal gambling club, where Don encounters Jimmy. Don punches him for revealing his infidelity to Betty.

After being escorted out, Don and Roger part ways with Freddy and continue on to a bar. There, Don admits that he is separated from Betty and reflects on his situation, saying he has to "move forward" with life. The next day, Don promotes Peggy to Freddy's position: although initially hesitant, viewing Freddy's incident as a mistake, she accepts the position. She then confronts Pete for exposing Freddy, who refuses to apologize and instead congratulates her on the promotion. Later, Mona confronts Don in anger, believing his recent conversation with Roger prompted him to leave her for Jane. As Jane becomes visibly distressed, Don instructs that she be removed as his secretary.

== Reception ==
Noel Murray, writing for The A.V. Club, expressed dissatisfaction with Betty's storyline in this episode. While commending Betty's development into becoming more independent, citing her manipulation of Arthur and Sarah Beth, he criticized the episode's emphasis on suggesting an affair between Betty and Arthur. Murray contends that Betty's "struggle with clinical depression is a more compelling narrative direction" and argues the series would benefit from focusing more on that aspect of her character.

The Guardian observed that Roger's affair with Jane was unexpected, stating that the series had previously emphasized the flirtatious dynamic between Roger and Joan, making his decision to leave Mona for Jane appear abrupt. It further argues that Roger had demonstrated stronger connections with other women in the past without abandoning his family, and that the relationship between Roger and Jane had not been sufficiently developed in prior episodes.

== Accolades ==
At the 61st Primetime Emmy Awards, "Six Month Leave" was nominated for Outstanding Writing in a Drama Series (Matthew Weiner, Andre and Maria Jacquemetton).
