= The Hobo Code =

- Mad Men episode
- Episode no.: Season 1 Episode 8
- Directed by: Phil Abraham
- Written by: Chris Provenzano
- Original air date: September 6, 2007
- Running time: 47 minutes

Guest appearances
- Rosemarie DeWitt as Midge Daniels; Robert Morse as Bert Cooper; Alison Brie as Trudy Campbell; Ian Bohen as Roy Hazelitt; Paul Schulze as The Hobo; Joseph Culp as Archibald "Archie" Whitman; Joel Murray as Freddy Rumsen; Bruce French as Hugh Brody; Paul Keeley as Elliot Lawrence; Brian Klugman as Judd; Crista Flanagan as Lois Sadler

Episode chronology
← Previous "Red in the Face"	Next → "Shoot"
- Mad Men season 1

"The Hobo Code" is the eighth episode of the first season of the American television drama series Mad Men. It was written by Chris Provenzano and directed by Phil Abraham. The episode originally aired on September 6, 2007, on the AMC channel in the United States.

== Plot ==
Peggy and Pete arrive early to work and they end up having sex in his office. Pete complains that Trudy does not understand him. He also confesses that he never read Peggy's Belle Jolie work, but she is relieved as she feared he read it and did not like it. Later, when Trudy unexpectedly visits Pete at work, he argues with her for showing up unannounced.

Bert unexpectedly gives Don a $2,500 bonus and urges him to read Atlas Shrugged. Don suggests a trip to Paris to Midge but instead ends up smoking marijuana with her and her beatnik friends. He then has a flashback to his childhood during the Great Depression: a hobo approaches his farm for food in exchange for work. Don's father, Archie, tells him to leave, but his stepmother Abigail lets him stay. The hobo, a well-mannered man from New York, explains he abandoned his career and family for the "freedom of the road" and shows Don the "hobo code" after Don confides he is a "whore-child". The next day, Archie refuses to pay the man for his work, and Don finds the symbol for "a dishonest man" carved into their fence.

Don successfully presents Peggy's campaign to Belle Jolie, which emphasizes that a woman wants to "mark her man". Peggy and the agency's female staff organize a celebration for her at a bar with Sterling Cooper's junior executives, but Joan implies Peggy should focus on what she has "downstairs" for true success. At the celebration, Peggy eagerly asks Pete to dance "The Twist", but he rejects her for being too forward and storms out, leaving her shocked. Meanwhile, Sal secretly meets Belle Jolie executive Elliott at a restaurant but Sal rejects the invitation to Elliott's hotel room, being too afraid to act on his homosexuality.

Don takes a photograph of Midge and Roy and realizes they are in love. They criticize his life as dishonest and trivial and when Midge refuses Don's offer to go to Paris, he signs over his bonus to her and suggests she buy a car. At home, Don wakes his son Bobby and tells him he can ask him anything, stating he will never lie to him. The next day, Peggy looks for Pete at the office, but when he arrives, he ignores her, leaving her hurt.

== First appearances ==
- Lois Sadler: a switchboard operator of Sterling-Cooper who has a crush on Salvatore Romano.
- Archibald "Archie" Whitman: a farmer during the Great Depression, Abigail's husband and Don's abusive biological father.

== Final appearances ==
- Roy Hazelitt: a beatnik and Midge's lover.

== Reception ==
The episode was received very positively by critics. Alan Sepinwall, writing for New Jersey's The Star-Ledger, praised the episode, specifically the subplot about Sal and Elliott, writing that the scene was "superb,” even as he commented that Peggy's story is compromised by the character's complexity, which “Elisabeth Moss is [not] as up to that challenge [of depicting] as Jon Hamm clearly is.” Andrew Johnston, writing for Slant Magazine, called the episode "the most polished and, to my mind, the most moving episode of Mad Men yet."
