= Phil Abraham =

American cinematographer and television director

- Years active: 1999–present

Phil Abraham is an American cinematographer and television director. He has received nominations for eight Primetime Emmy Award nominations winning in 2008. He is known for his work on the HBO crime drama series The Sopranos and the AMC period drama series Mad Men.

== Career ==
He worked on all six seasons of The Sopranos, initially as a camera operator, then as a cinematographer and eventually as an episodic director.

He won the 2008 Primetime Emmy Award for Outstanding Cinematography for a One Hour Series for his work on the pilot of Mad Men and has been nominated for four other Primetime Emmy Awards for Outstanding Cinematography for a Single-Camera Series for his work on The Sopranos. Besides working as a cinematographer for Mad Men, he has also worked as a director for fifteen episodes. He picked up two more nominations for a Primetime Emmy Award for Outstanding Directing for a Drama Series for Mad Men episodes "The Jet Set" and "The Other Woman". He attended high school at York Preparatory School and graduated from Wesleyan University, along with Mad Men creator Matthew Weiner.

== Filmography ==
=== Director ===
Year	Title	Episode(s)
2007–2015	Mad Men	"The Hobo Code"
2007–2015	Mad Men	"Maidenform"
2007–2015	Mad Men	"The Jet Set"
2007–2015	Mad Men	"Out of Town"
2007–2015	Mad Men	"The Fog"
2007–2015	Mad Men	"Souvenir"
2007–2015	Mad Men	"Public Relations"
2007–2015	Mad Men	"The Summer Man"
2007–2015	Mad Men	"Chinese Wall"
2007–2015	Mad Men	"Lady Lazarus"
2007–2015	Mad Men	"The Other Woman"
2007–2015	Mad Men	"The Quality of Mercy"
2007–2015	Mad Men	"The Better Half"
2007–2015	Mad Men	"The Strategy"
2007–2015	Mad Men	"Lost Horizon"
2007	The Sopranos	"Remember When"
2008	Crash	"F-36, Sprint Left, T-4"
2009	Breaking Bad	"Over"
2009-2010	Sons of Anarchy	"Service"
2009-2010	Sons of Anarchy	"June Wedding"
2010	Mercy	"I Did Kill You, Didn't I?"
2010	White Collar	"Bottlenecked"
2011	The Good Wife	"Wrongful Termination"
2011	Lights Out	"Head Games"
2011	The Walking Dead	"Save the Last One"
2011	Hell On Wheels	"A New Birth of Freedom"
2011	The Playboy Club	"A Tryst of Fate" (unaired)
2011-2013	The Killing	"Super 8"
2011-2013	The Killing	"Ogi Jun"
2011-2013	The Killing	"Sayonara, Hiawatha"
2011-2013	The Killing	"From Up Here"
2012	Elementary	"You Do It Yourself"
2012	Boss	"Redemption"
2012	Weeds	"Five Miles from Yetzer Hara"
2013	Masters of Sex	"Phallic Victories"
2013	Hostages	"Burden of Truth"
2013	The Following	"The Siege"
2013–2015	Orange Is the New Black	"Moscow Mule"
2013–2015	Orange Is the New Black	"A Whole Other Hole"
2013–2015	Orange Is the New Black	"It Was the Change"
2013–2015	Orange Is the New Black	"We Can Be Heroes"
2013–2015	Orange Is the New Black	"Trust No Bitch"
2014	Those Who Kill	"Rocking The Boat"
2014–2015	The Strain	"The Master"
2014–2015	The Strain	"The Assassin"
2014–2015	The Strain	"Dead End"
2014–2016	Ray Donovan	"Gem and Loan"
2014–2016	Ray Donovan	"Federal Boobie Inspector"
2015	Halt and Catch Fire	"New Coke"
2015	Halt and Catch Fire	"Heaven is A Place"
2015–2016	Bates Motel	"Norma Louise"
2015–2016	Bates Motel	"Till Death Do You Part"
2015–2018	Daredevil	"Into the Ring"
2015–2018	Daredevil	"Cut Man"
2015–2018	Daredevil	"Bang"
2015–2018	Daredevil	"Dogs to a Gunfight"
2015–2018	Daredevil	"One Last Shot"
2016	Good Behavior	"The Ballad of Little Santino"
2017	The Defenders	"Royal Dragon"
2018	Ozark	"Game Day"
2018	Ozark	"Outer Darkness"
2019	Jack Ryan	"Cargo"
2019	Jack Ryan	"Tertia Opio"
2019	Castle Rock	"Restore Hope"
2019	Castle Rock	"New Jerusalem"
2020	Most Dangerous Game	"The Offer"
2020	Most Dangerous Game	"The Motivation"
2020	Most Dangerous Game	"The Rules"
2020	Most Dangerous Game	"The Acceptance"
2020	Most Dangerous Game	"The Start"
2020	Most Dangerous Game	"Wash Hands After Using"
2020	Most Dangerous Game	"No Running on the Platform"
2020	Most Dangerous Game	"Please Whisper in Church"
2020	Most Dangerous Game	"Return Tools to their Place"
2020	Most Dangerous Game	"Five for Fighting"
2020	Most Dangerous Game	"You Always Remember Your First"
2020	Most Dangerous Game	"A Ship Is Safe Only In Port"
2020	Most Dangerous Game	"Always Gets a Second Opinion"
2020	Most Dangerous Game	"What's Old Is New Again"
2020	Most Dangerous Game	"Game Over"
2023	Hunters	"The Trial of Adolf Hitler"
2023	Hunters	"Only the Dead"
2023	Hunters	"The Fare"
2023	Hunters	"Buenos Aires"
2023	Hunters	"Van Glooten's Day 1972 Butter Sculptor of the Year"
2023-2025	FUBAR	"Pilot"
2023-2025	FUBAR	"Royally Flushed"
2023-2025	FUBAR	"Fullest House"
2023-2025	FUBAR	"Highly Re-Greta-Ble"
2023-2025	FUBAR	"Tango and Smash"
2023-2025	FUBAR	"Let's Twist Again"
2025	Boots	"The Buddy System"
2025	Boots	"The Confidence Course"
2026	Your Friends & Neighbors	"Out East"
2026	Your Friends & Neighbors	"I Feel Lost Without Me"
2026	Dutton Ranch	"Den of Sin"
2026	Dutton Ranch	"Whiskey Limits"

=== Cinematographer ===
Year	Title	Episode(s)
2007	Mad Men	"Smoke Gets in Your Eyes"
2007	Mad Men	"Ladies Room"
2007	Mad Men	"Marriage of Figaro"
2007	Mad Men	"New Amsterdam"
2007	Mad Men	"Babylon"
2006	Six Degrees	"Pilot"
1999-2007	The Sopranos	"The Legend of Tennessee Moltisanti"
1999-2007	The Sopranos	"Boca"
1999-2007	The Sopranos	"A Hit is a Hit"
1999-2007	The Sopranos	"Nobody Knows Anything"
1999-2007	The Sopranos	"Isabella"
1999-2007	The Sopranos	"I Dream of Jeannie Cusamano"
1999-2007	The Sopranos	"Guy Walks Into a Psychiatrist's Office"
1999-2007	The Sopranos	"Do Not Resuscitate"
1999-2007	The Sopranos	"Toodle-Fucking-Oo"
1999-2007	The Sopranos	"Commendatori"
1999-2007	The Sopranos	"Big Girls Don't Cry"
1999-2007	The Sopranos	"The Happy Wanderer"
1999-2007	The Sopranos	"D-Girl"
1999-2007	The Sopranos	"Full Leather Jacket"
1999-2007	The Sopranos	"From Where to Eternity"
1999-2007	The Sopranos	"Bust-Out"
1999-2007	The Sopranos	"House Arrest"
1999-2007	The Sopranos	"The Knight in White Satin Armor"
1999-2007	The Sopranos	"Funhouse"
1999-2007	The Sopranos	"Proshai, Livushka"
1999-2007	The Sopranos	"Second Opinion"
1999-2007	The Sopranos	"The Telltale Moozadell"
1999-2007	The Sopranos	"Pine Barrens"
1999-2007	The Sopranos	"Army of One"
1999-2007	The Sopranos	"For All Debts Public and Private"
1999-2007	The Sopranos	"Christopher"
1999-2007	The Sopranos	"The Weight"
1999-2007	The Sopranos	"Mergers and Acquisitions"
1999-2007	The Sopranos	"Whoever Did This"
1999-2007	The Sopranos	"Calling All Cars"
1999-2007	The Sopranos	"Whitecaps"
1999-2007	The Sopranos	"Two Tonys"
1999-2007	The Sopranos	"Where's Johnny?"
1999-2007	The Sopranos	"Irregular Around the Margins"
1999-2007	The Sopranos	"Sentimental Education"
1999-2007	The Sopranos	"Unidentified Black Males"
1999-2007	The Sopranos	"The Test Dream"
1999-2007	The Sopranos	"All Due Respect"
1999-2007	The Sopranos	"Members Only"
1999-2007	The Sopranos	"Mayham"
1999-2007	The Sopranos	"Mr. & Mrs. John Sacrimoni Request"
1999-2007	The Sopranos	"Luxury Lounge"
1999-2007	The Sopranos	"The Ride"
1999-2007	The Sopranos	"Cold Stones"
1999-2007	The Sopranos	"Soprano Home Movies"
1999-2007	The Sopranos	"Walk Like a Man"
1999-2007	The Sopranos	"The Blue Comet"

== Awards and nominations ==
Organizations	Year	Category	Work	Result	Ref.
Primetime Emmy Awards	2000	Outstanding Cinematography for a Series (One Hour)	The Sopranos (episode: "D–Girl")	Nominated	
Primetime Emmy Awards	2004	Outstanding Cinematography for a Series (One Hour)	The Sopranos (episode: "Irregular Around the Margins")	Nominated	
Primetime Emmy Awards	2006	Outstanding Cinematography for a Series (One Hour)	The Sopranos (episode: "The Ride")	Nominated	
Primetime Emmy Awards	2007	Outstanding Cinematography for a Series (One Hour)	The Sopranos (episode: "Soprano Home Movies")	Nominated	
Primetime Emmy Awards	2008	Outstanding Cinematography for a Series (One Hour)	Mad Men (episode: "Smoke Gets in Your Eyes")	Won	
Primetime Emmy Awards	2009	Outstanding Directing for a Drama Series	Mad Men (episode: "The Jet Set")	Nominated	
Primetime Emmy Awards	2012	Outstanding Directing for a Drama Series	Mad Men (episode: "The Other Woman")	Nominated	
Primetime Emmy Awards	2020	Outstanding Short Form Comedy or Drama Series	Most Dangerous Game	Nominated	
