= Three Sundays =

- Mad Men episode
- Episode no.: Season 2 Episode 4
- Directed by: Tim Hunter
- Written by: Andre Jacquemetton and Maria Jacquemetton
- Original air date: August 24, 2008

Guest appearances
- Robert Morse as Bert Cooper; Mark Moses as Herman "Duck" Phillips; Melinda McGraw as Bobbie Barrett; Talia Balsam as Mona Sterling; Colin Hanks as Father Gill; Audrey Wasilewski as Anita Olson Respola; Myra Turley as Katherine Olson; Marguerite Moreau as Vicky; Michael Dempsey as Marty Hasselbach; Elizabeth Rice as Margaret Sterling; Jerry O'Donnell as Gerry Respola; Christopher Carroll as Monsignor Cavanaugh

Episode chronology
← Previous "The Benefactor"	Next → "The New Girl"
- Mad Men season 2

"Three Sundays" is the fourth episode of the second season of the American television drama series Mad Men. It was written by Andre Jacquemetton and Maria Jacquemetton and directed by Tim Hunter. The episode originally aired on AMC in the United States on August 17, 2008.

In the episode, which takes place across Passion Sunday, Palm Sunday, and Easter Sunday, Don and his team anxiously prepare for a pitch for American Airlines, Peggy develops a relationship with her priest, and Roger attempts to form a romantic relationship with a call girl.

== Plot ==
Peggy feigns sickness to leave Mass early. On her way out, she meets Father Gill, a visiting priest. After a brief conversation, she returns to Mass. Father Gill attends the Olson's for dinner, and Peggy's mother expresses pride with Peggy's life. Father Gill asks Peggy for advice on presentations for his upcoming sermon, and later gives Peggy a copy. Anita becomes jealous, sensing Father Gill's attraction to Peggy. Anita confesses to Father Gill that Peggy has an illegitimate child. Stunned, Father Gill advises her to forgive Peggy.

Meanwhile, Roger and Mona dine with their daughter Margaret and fiancé Brooks, trying but failing to convince Margaret to have a big wedding. Later, Roger sleeps with a call girl, Vicky, whom he met through Ken and Pete. He pays extra for a more romantic experience and later convinces her to dine with him at Lutèce.

Don and Betty cancel plans to spend the day together. Duck calls Don, informing him the American Airlines pitch has been moved up, requiring him to go into the office. Bobby burns his chin on the griddle: Betty takes Bobby to the hospital, leaving Don to bring Sally to work. Sally explores the office, overhears and attempts to start adult conversations, and drinks alcohol: Don notices but says nothing.

At Sterling Cooper, Duck organizes the American pitch. Unhappy with the creative direction, Don shifts focus away from the airline's past accident, and to its future. Sterling Cooper learn their contact at American was fired, diminishing their chances at recruiting the airline, but they present anyway. Afterwards, Don criticizes Duck for losing the account, but Roger defends the thrill of "the chase".

That evening, Don and Betty argue about disciplining Bobby, with Betty insisting Don should hit him: Bobby apologizes to Don for his behavior. Later, Don opens up about his own abuse, urging Betty to be grateful for Bobby. Betty silently apologizes. Meanwhile, at an Easter egg hunt, Father Gill thanks Peggy for her advice and gives her an Easter egg for "the little one".

== First appearances ==
- Brooks Hargrove: Margaret's fiancée.
- Father John Gill: a young, visiting priest.

== Reception ==
The episode has generally received positive reviews. Noel Murray from The A.V. Club gave the episode an A, saying it showcased "little slices of life, in which small gestures [are to] impress [the] unattainable". IGN gave the episode a rating of 8.7/10, explaining how the episode "[brings] the funny, but it excels in the sorrow". Will Dean of The Guardian praised the episode for its attention to Peggy's personal life, saying "the whole plot was deftly done" and that Father Gill's presence "was a subtle and nuanced trick... [It was] infinitely more interesting by keeping [them] away from each other". Sally Tamarkin from The Slate praised the episode, and said it should be used as an introduction for first-time watchers of the series.
