= Kater Gordon =

American television writer

- Occupation: Television writer
- Writing career
- Notable work: Mad Men

Kater Gordon is an American television writer. She worked on the AMC drama Mad Men, and won a Writers Guild of America (WGA) Award and an Emmy Award.

== Biography ==
Gordon joined the crew of AMC drama Mad Men as a writing assistant for the second season in 2008. She co-wrote the season 2 finale "Meditations in an Emergency" with series creator and show runner Matthew Weiner. Gordon returned as a staff writer for the third season in 2009 and wrote the episode "The Fog" and co-wrote the episode "The Color Blue" (with Weiner). Gordon and the writing staff won the Writers Guild of America (WGA) Award for Best Drama Series at the February 2010 ceremony for their work on the third season.

In 2009, she won an Emmy Award for her writing on the AMC drama Mad Men. Gordon was fired from Mad Men three weeks after receiving the Emmy, with a Mad Men staff member saying "We think [Kater’s] done a great job, particularly for someone whose career has progressed so quickly. Now, however, Matt has reluctantly decided that their relationship has reached its full potential."

On November 9, 2017, she launched Modern Alliance, a charitable project to fight harassment and later joined the board of iHollaback, an anti-harassment organization. Gordon revealed that she was inspired to do the work because of an experience she alleges she had years earlier with Weiner. She accused Weiner of telling her at the office one night that she owed it to him “to see her naked.” Gordon never formally complained; she said this was for fear of hurting her career. Gordon decided to speak out and take action years later after allegations of sexual misconduct by Harvey Weinstein and other Hollywood sexual assaults came to light. Marti Noxon, a producer and writer on the show, later gave her support to Gordon's claims.

In 2020, Noxon and Gordon published a guest column in the Hollywood Reporter suggesting ways the "TV Industry can better protect employees from the next toxic showrunner."
