= Michael Gladis =

American actor (born 1977)

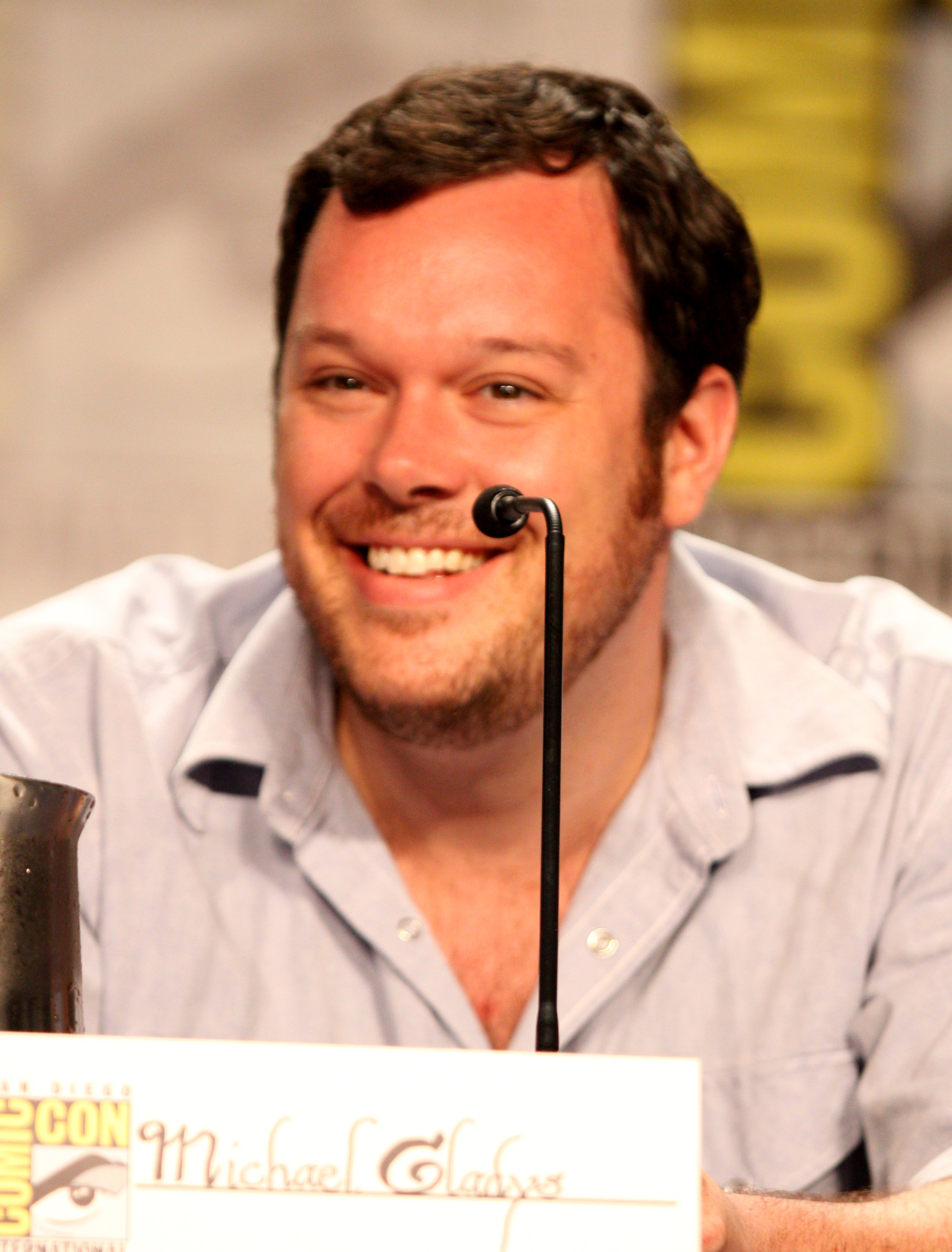
- Gladis at the 2011 San Diego Comic-Con
- Born: August 30, 1977 (age 49); Houston, Texas, U.S.
- Education: State University of New York at New Paltz (BA)
- Occupation: Actor
- Years active: 2002–present
- Spouse: Beth Behrs (m. 2018)
- Children: 1

Michael Gladis (born August 30, 1977) is an American actor. He played Paul Kinsey in the television series Mad Men.

== Early life and education ==
Gladis was born in Houston, Texas, and grew up in Farmington, Connecticut, graduating from Farmington High School in 1995. Inspiration for a life of acting originated from the time he spent volunteering for theater productions at Miss Porter's School, the internationally known all-girls school in town, where he knew male actors were needed.

He started his college career at the SUNY School of Art Design at Alfred University before transferring to State University of New York at New Paltz, from which he earned a B.A. in theatre in 1999.

== Career ==
Prior to Mad Men, he played Eugene Rossi in four episodes of Third Watch. He formerly starred in the Adult Swim comedy Eagleheart. Gladis appeared in an episode of Law & Order: Special Victims Unit titled "Branded" and in an episode of Leverage titled "The 15 Minute Job".

He provided the voice and MotionScan of Dudley Lynch in the game L.A. Noire and was Senior Seaman Yevgeny Borzenkov in the 2002 film K19: The Widowmaker. In 2015, he portrayed Lieutenant Matias in the science fiction action film Terminator Genisys.

== Personal life ==
On July 10, 2016, Gladis became engaged to Beth Behrs and on July 21, 2018, they married at Moose Creek Ranch in Victor, Idaho, just outside Jackson Hole. In 2022, Behrs and Gladis had a daughter.

== Filmography ==
=== Film ===
Year	Title	Role	Notes
2002	K-19: The Widowmaker	Yevgeny Borzenkov	
2004	Press Gang	Brian	Short film
2012	The Argument with Beth Behrs & Michael Gladis	Michael Gladis	Short film
2013	Armed Response	Bruce	
2013	Devil's Knot	Dan Stidham	
2013	Knights of Badassdom	King Diamond	
2013	Low Expectations	Pernell Roberts	Short film
2014	Not Safe for Work	John Ferguson	
2015	Terminator Genisys	Lt. Matias	
2017	Without Ward	T.S. Garp Gault	

=== Television ===
Year	Title	Role	Notes
2003	Hack	Dan Kelley	Episode: "Out of the Ashes"
2003	Third Watch	Eugene Rossi	4 episodes
2005	Law & Order: Criminal Intent	Donny	Episode: "Prisoner"
2007	Life	Dean Gill	Episode: "Serious Control Issues"
2007–2009, 2012	Mad Men	Paul Kinsey	38 episodes
2009	The Good Wife	Mark Richardson	Episode: "Lifeguard"
2010	Law & Order: Criminal Intent	Randall	Episode: "Love Sick"
2010	Medium	Dave Anderson	Episode: "The Match Game"
2010	Law & Order: Special Victims Unit	Bill Dixon	Episode: "Branded"
2011	House	Jaimie	Episode: "Family Practice"
2011	Leverage	Reed Rockwell	Episode: "The 15 Minutes Job"
2011–2012	Eagleheart	Chief	13 episodes
2012	How I Met Your Mother	Chester	Episode: "Trilogy Time"
2013	Justified	Kenneth	Episode: "Money Trap"
2013	The Mentalist	Curtis Wiley	Episode: "Red Lacquer Nail Polish"
2013	Revolution	Militia Boat Captain	Episode: "The Love Boat"
2014	Reckless	Deputy Chief Holland Knox	13 episodes
2015	Battle Creek	Robert Whitehall	Episode: "Heirlooms"
2015	Extant	Nate Malone	6 episodes
2015	House of Lies	John Andrews	3 episodes
2015	The Librarians	Frankenstein's Monster	Episode: "And the Broken Staff"
2016	Elementary	Rodger Stapleton	Episode: "Hounded"
2016	The Call Room	Jim (voice)	1 episode
2016	Feed the Beast	Patrick "The Tooth Fairy" Woichik	10 episodes
2017	Lucifer	Sam	Episode: "They're Back, Aren't They?"
2018	Criminal Minds	Pastor Hollis Monroe	Episode: "Innocence"
2020	Penny Dreadful: City of Angels	Charlton Townsend	Main
2021	The Neighborhood	Dr. Fisher	Episode: "Welcome to the Procedure"
2021	Law & Order: Special Victims Unit	Andy Richards	Episode: "What Can Happen in the Dark"
2024	Death and Other Details	Keith Trubitsky	6 episodes
2024	Law & Order	Christopher Heartwood	Episode: "The Meaning of Life"
2024	Monsters: The Lyle and Erik Menendez Story	Tim Rutten	3 episodes

=== Video game ===
Year	Title	Role
2011	L.A. Noire	Dudley Lynch (voice)
