= Robin Veith =

American television writer (born 1975)

- Born: June 18, 1975 (age 51)
- Occupation: Television writer
- Writing career
- Notable work: Mad Men

Robin Veith is an American television writer. She served as a writer's assistant on the first season of Mad Men and co-wrote the final episode of the season "The Wheel" with the series creator Matthew Weiner. Weiner and Veith were nominated for an Emmy Award for Outstanding Writing for a Drama Series for their work on the episode. Alongside her colleagues on the writing staff she won a Writers Guild of America Award for Best New Series and was nominated for the award for Best Dramatic Series at the February 2008 ceremony for her work on the season. She returned for the second season as a staff writer. She was nominated for the WGA award for Best Dramatic Series a second time at the February 2009 ceremony for her work on the second season. She won the WGA Award for Best Drama Series (after being nominated for the third consecutive year) at the February 2010 ceremony for her work on the third season. Veith was also nominated for the WGA award for episodic drama at the February 2010 ceremony for her work on "Guy Walks into an Advertising Agency" (with co-writer Weiner).

In 2011 Veith joined the crew of FX boxing drama Lights Out as a co-producer and writer. She wrote the episodes "Crossroads" and "Rainmaker". The show was canceled during its first season. She was a producer for the long-running NBC legal drama, Law & Order: Special Victims Unit. She is currently co-executive producer for the science-fiction show The Expanse.
