= Matthew Weiner =

American screenwriter, director, producer and author

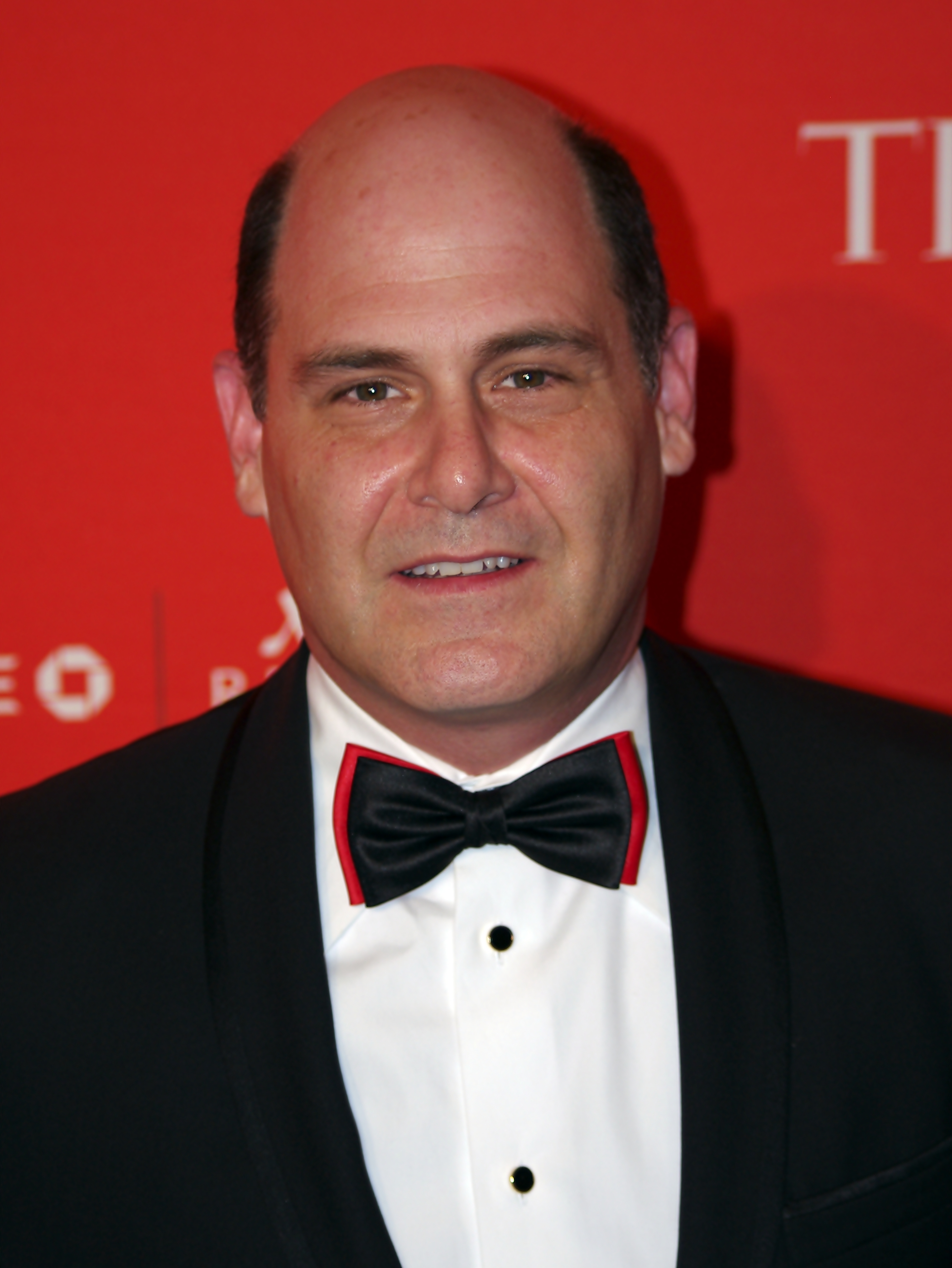
- Weiner at the 2011 Time 100 gala
- Born: Matthew Hoffman Weiner; June 29, 1965 (age 61); Baltimore, Maryland, U.S.
- Education: Wesleyan University (BA); University of Southern California (MFA)
- Occupations: Screenwriter, television producer, director
- Years active: 1996–present
- Spouse: Linda Brettler (m. 1991; div. 2019)
- Children: 4

Matthew Hoffman Weiner (/ˈwaɪnər/; born June 29, 1965) is an American television writer, producer, and director best known as the creator and showrunner of the television series Mad Men, and as a writer and executive producer on The Sopranos.

Weiner began his television career as a writer on Becker. He worked on several other sitcoms before writing the pilot episode of Mad Men as a spec script and joining the writing staff of The Sopranos prior to its fifth season. After achieving success on both The Sopranos and Mad Men, he wrote, directed, and produced the comedy-drama film Are You Here in 2013, published his first novel Heather, the Totality in 2017, and created the anthology drama series The Romanoffs in 2018.

Weiner has won nine Primetime Emmy Awards, two for The Sopranos and seven for Mad Men, as well as three Golden Globe Awards for Mad Men. Mad Men won the Primetime Emmy Award for Outstanding Drama Series for four consecutive years (2008, 2009, 2010, 2011); The Sopranos (with Weiner as an executive producer) won the same award twice, in 2004 and 2007. In 2011, Weiner was included in Time's annual Time 100 as one of the "Most Influential People in the World". In November 2011, The Atlantic named him one of 21 "Brave Thinkers".

== Early life and education ==
Weiner was born in 1965 in Baltimore to a Jewish family. He attended The Park School of Baltimore and moved to Los Angeles in 1975, when he was nine, where he attended Harvard School for Boys. His father was a medical researcher and chair of the neurology department at University of Southern California. His mother graduated from law school but never practiced. He enrolled in the College of Letters at Wesleyan University, studying literature, philosophy, and history and earned an MFA from the University of Southern California School of Cinema and Television.

== Career ==
=== 1997–2007: Early work and The Sopranos ===
Weiner described the start of his career as a "dark time. Show business looked so impenetrable that I eventually stopped writing." During this time, his wife financially supported them with her work as an architect. He began his screenwriting career writing for the short-lived Fox sitcom Party Girl (1996). He was a writer and producer on The Naked Truth and Andy Richter Controls the Universe. Weiner wrote the pilot of Mad Men in 1999 as a spec script while working as a writer on Becker. The Sopranos creator and executive producer David Chase offered Weiner a job as a writer for the series after being impressed by the script.

Weiner served as a supervising producer for the fifth season of The Sopranos (2004), a co-executive producer for the first part of the sixth season (2006), and an executive producer for the second part of the sixth season (2007). He has sole or joint credit for 12 episodes overall, including the Primetime Emmy Award-nominated episodes "Unidentified Black Males" (co-written with Terence Winter) and "Kennedy and Heidi" (co-written with David Chase). He received two Primetime Emmy Awards as a producer of The Sopranos — one for the show's fifth season in 2004 and one for the second part of the show's sixth season in 2007.

In addition to writing and producing, he acted in two episodes, "Two Tonys" and "Stage 5" as fictional mafia expert Manny Safier, author of The Wise Guide to Wise Guys, on TV news broadcasts within the show. Weiner also spent the hiatus between the two seasons teaching at his alma mater, the University of Southern California School of Cinema-Television (now School of Cinematic Arts), where he taught an undergraduate screenwriting class on Feature Rewriting during the Fall 2004 semester.

=== 2007–2015: Mad Men and acclaim ===
During his time on The Sopranos Weiner began looking for a network to produce Mad Men. HBO, Showtime and FX passed on the project. HBO offered to produce the series if Chase would be on board as a writer or producer, but Chase instead chose to focus on developing feature films. Weiner eventually pitched the series to AMC, which had never produced an original dramatic television series. It picked up the show, ordering a full 13-episode season. Mad Men premiered on July 19, 2007, six weeks after The Sopranos concluded. Weiner served as showrunner, an executive producer, and head writer of Mad Men throughout its seven seasons. As the showrunner he had a major role in the writing and directing of each episode, also approving actors, costumes, hairstyles, and props. He is credited with writing or co-writing seven episodes of the first season, eleven episodes of the second, twelve episodes of the third, ten of the fourth, nine of the fifth, ten of the sixth, and twelve of the seventh. He also directed all seven season finales, along with the season seven midseason finale and the penultimate episode of the series.

Mad Men has received considerable critical acclaim and has won four Golden Globe Awards and fifteen Primetime Emmy Awards. It is the first basic cable series to win the Primetime Emmy Award for Outstanding Drama Series, winning the award in 2008, 2009, 2010, and 2011. Weiner won the Primetime Emmy Award for Outstanding Writing for a Drama Series for the pilot episode, "Smoke Gets in Your Eyes", in 2008, as well as being nominated for "The Wheel" (with Robin Veith). He also won Primetime Emmys for the same category in 2009, for "Meditations in an Emergency" (shared with Kater Gordon), and in 2010, for "Shut the Door. Have a Seat." (shared with Erin Levy). In 2009, he was also nominated for "A Night to Remember" (with Veith), "Six Month Leave" (with Andre Jacquemetton & Maria Jacquemetton), and "The Jet Set"; he was also nominated in 2010 for "Guy Walks into an Advertising Agency" (with Veith). In 2011, he was nominated for "The Suitcase". In 2012, he was nominated for "Far Away Places" and "The Other Woman", both with Semi Chellas. Most recently, in 2015, he was nominated for "Lost Horizon" with Chellas and "Person to Person".

Weiner and his writing staff also won a Writers Guild of America Award for Best New Series and were nominated for the award Best Dramatic Series at the February 2008 ceremony for their work on the first season. They were nominated for the WGA award for Best Dramatic Series a second time at the February 2009 ceremony for their work on the second season. Weiner and the writing staff won the WGA Award for Best Drama Series (after being nominated for the third consecutive year) at the February 2010 ceremony for their work on the third season. Weiner was also twice nominated for the WGA award for episodic drama at the February 2010 ceremony for his work on "The Grown-Ups" (with co-writer Brett Johnson) and "Guy Walks into an Advertising Agency" (with Robin Veith). Weiner's first feature film, Are You Here, filmed in North Carolina, premiered at the 2013 Toronto International Film Festival and was released in 2014.

=== 2016–present ===
Weiner's first novel, Heather, the Totality, was published in the fall of 2017. In 2018, Weiner created The Romanoffs, an Amazon Video anthology series.

In May 2025, the world premier of Weiner's play, John Wilkes Booth: One Night Only, took place at Baltimore Center Stage. Both Weiner and Booth were originally from the Baltimore, Maryland area. The premiere was about a mile from Green Mount Cemetery where Booth is buried.

=== Prospective projects ===
In 2020, it was announced that Weiner was developing a half-hour dramedy at FX which he would write, direct and executive produce as his next TV project. While no plot details were disclosed, sources said at the time that the show would also contain elements of mystery. However, by 2022, the project was no longer moving forward at FX.

In 2025, it was reported that New Regency had hired Weiner to write a television series adaptation of the 1989 psychological thriller film Dead Calm.

== Personal life ==
Weiner married architect Linda Brettler in 1991. He filed for divorce in July 2019. One of their four sons, Marten Holden Weiner, played the recurring role of Glen Bishop on Mad Men.

In August 2015, he signed, along with 98 other members of the Los Angeles Jewish community, an open letter supporting the proposed nuclear agreement between Iran and six world powers led by the United States "as being in the best interest of the United States and Israel."

On November 9, 2017, former Mad Men writer Kater Gordon accused Weiner of making a comment at the office one night to the effect that she owed it to him "to see her naked." Weiner denies any memory of making the alleged comment. Furthermore, Weiner told Vanity Fair, "I can't see a scenario where I would say that. What I can see is, it was 10 years ago and I don't remember saying it. When someone says you said something, like the experience we just had right now – I don't remember saying that."

== Works ==
=== Television ===
Series	Year	Network	Credited as				Notes
Series	Year	Network	Writer	Producer	Director	Other	Notes
The Naked Truth	1997–1998	ABC	Yes	No	No	No	
Becker	1999–2002	CBS	Yes	Yes	No	No	
Baby Blues	2002	The WB	Yes	No	No	No	
In-Laws	2002	NBC	Yes	No	No	No	
Andy Richter Controls the Universe	2002–2003	Fox	Yes	Supervising	No	No	
The Sopranos	2004–2007	HBO	Yes	Executive	No	Actor	Role: Manny Safier
Mad Men	2007–2015	AMC	Yes	Executive	Yes	Creator	
The Simpsons	2011	Fox	No	No	No	Actor	Role: Businessman
Orange Is the New Black	2016	Netflix	No	No	Yes	No	Episode "The Animals"
The Romanoffs	2018	Amazon Prime Video	Yes	Executive	Yes	Creator	
Goliath	2019	Amazon Prime Video	No	No	No	Actor	Role: Matthew

=== Film ===
Title	Year	Credited as				Notes
Title	Year	Writer	Producer	Director	Other	Notes
Name of the Game, Sports Tales and Tunes	1994	Yes	No	No	No	Short film
Hanukkah Tales and Tunes	1994	Yes	No	No	No	Short film
What Do You Do All Day?	1996	No	Yes	Yes	Actor	Short film, role: Matt
Are You Here	2013	Yes	Yes	Yes	No	

=== Published works ===
Title	Year	Credit	Notes
Heather, the Totality	2017	Author	Debut novel

== Awards and nominations ==
Primetime Emmy Awards
Year	Category	Nominated work	Result	Ref.
2004	Outstanding Drama Series	The Sopranos (season 5)	Won	
2004	Outstanding Writing for a Drama Series	The Sopranos (episode: "Unidentified Black Males")	Nominated	
2006	Outstanding Drama Series	The Sopranos (season 6 - Part 1)	Nominated	
2007	Outstanding Drama Series	The Sopranos (season 6 - Part 2)	Won	
2007	Outstanding Writing for a Drama Series	The Sopranos (episode: "Kennedy and Heidi")	Nominated	
2008	Outstanding Drama Series	Mad Men (season 1)	Won	
2008	Outstanding Writing for a Drama Series	Mad Men (episode: "Smoke Gets in Your Eyes")	Won	
2008	Outstanding Writing for a Drama Series	Mad Men (episode: "The Wheel")	Nominated	
2009	Outstanding Drama Series	Mad Men (season 2)	Won	
2009	Outstanding Writing for a Drama Series	Mad Men (episode: "A Night to Remember")	Nominated	
2009	Outstanding Writing for a Drama Series	Mad Men (episode: "Six Month Leave")	Nominated	
2009	Outstanding Writing for a Drama Series	Mad Men (episode: "The Jet Set")	Nominated	
2009	Outstanding Writing for a Drama Series	Mad Men (episode: "Mediatations in an Emergency")	Won	
2010	Outstanding Drama Series	Mad Men (season 3)	Won	
2010	Outstanding Writing for a Drama Series	Mad Men (episode: "Guy Walks Into an Advertising Agency")	Nominated	
2010	Outstanding Writing for a Drama Series	Mad Men (episode: "Shut the Door. Have a Seat")	Won	
2011	Outstanding Drama Series	Mad Men (season 4)	Won	
2011	Outstanding Writing for a Drama Series	Mad Men (episode: "The Suitcase")	Nominated	
2012	Outstanding Drama Series	Mad Men (season 5)	Nominated	
2012	Outstanding Writing for a Drama Series	Mad Men (episode: "Far Away Places")	Nominated	
2012	Outstanding Writing for a Drama Series	Mad Men (episode: "The Other Woman")	Nominated	
2013	Outstanding Drama Series	Mad Men (season 6)	Nominated	
2014	Outstanding Drama Series	Mad Men (season 7 - Part 1)	Nominated	
2015	Outstanding Drama Series	Mad Men (season 7 - Part 2)	Nominated	
2015	Outstanding Writing for a Drama Series	Mad Men (episode: "Lost Horizon")	Nominated	
2015	Outstanding Writing for a Drama Series	Mad Men (episode: "Person to Person")	Nominated	
