= Mad Men =

American period drama television series (2007–2015)

- Genre: Period drama; Drama
- Created by: Matthew Weiner
- Showrunner: Matthew Weiner
- Starring: Jon Hamm; Elisabeth Moss; Vincent Kartheiser; January Jones; Christina Hendricks; Bryan Batt; Michael Gladis; Aaron Staton; Rich Sommer; Maggie Siff; John Slattery; Robert Morse; Jared Harris; Kiernan Shipka; Jessica Paré; Christopher Stanley; Jay R. Ferguson; Kevin Rahm; Ben Feldman; Mason Vale Cotton
- Opening theme: "A Beautiful Mine" (instrumental) by RJD2
- Composer: David Carbonara
- Country of origin: United States
- Original language: English
- No. of seasons: 7
- No. of episodes: 92 (list of episodes)

Production
- Executive producers: Matthew Weiner; Scott Hornbacher; Andre Jacquemetton; Maria Jacquemetton; Janet Leahy
- Production locations: Los Angeles, California
- Running time: 44–57 minutes
- Production companies: Weiner Bros. Productions; Lionsgate Television; RadicalMedia (pilot only); AMC Original Productions

Original release
- Network: AMC
- Release: July 19, 2007 – May 17, 2015

Mad Men is an American period drama television series created by Matthew Weiner for AMC. It ran from July 19, 2007 until May 17, 2015, with seven seasons and 92 episodes. The series title is allegedly borrowed from the phrase advertisers working on Madison Avenue used to refer to themselves, although the only documented use of the phrase may derive from the late-1950s work of James Kelly, an advertising executive and writer.

Set between March 1960 and November 1970, Mad Men follows Don Draper (Jon Hamm), a senior executive and creative director at Sterling Cooper, a Manhattan-based advertising agency. Other primary characters include Peggy Olson (Elisabeth Moss), Don's secretary; Pete Campbell (Vincent Kartheiser), a mid-level executive at Sterling Cooper; Joan Holloway (Christina Hendricks), the agency's office manager; Roger Sterling (John Slattery), the agency's name partner; Betty Draper (January Jones), Don's wife; and in later seasons, Sally Draper (Kiernan Shipka), Don's oldest child. As the series progresses, it depicts the changing moods and social mores of the United States throughout the 1960s and early 1970s.

Weiner first developed Mad Men in 2000 but it was greenlit by AMC several years later, acting as the network's first original series. Principal photography for Mad Men primarily took place in New York City and Los Angeles during its run and the writers conducted large amounts of research to accurately depict its time period. The series is considered the breakthrough roles for Hamm, Slattery, and Jones and helped revive the career of Hendricks.

Mad Men received widespread acclaim for its writing, acting, directing, historical authenticity and visual style. It won several awards, including 16 Emmys and 5 Golden Globes. Mad Men is the first basic cable series to receive the Emmy Award for Outstanding Drama Series, winning it each year of its first four seasons (2008–2011). It is widely regarded as a key series in the Golden Age of Television in the early 21st century and as one of the greatest television series of all time.

== Production ==
=== Premise ===
The series covers the advertising industry centered on Madison Avenue in New York City in the 1960s, primarily following the professional and personal life of protagonist Don Draper, a creative director and partner at a Manhattan firm. The plotlines also follow the personal and professional lives of Draper's family and co-workers as they relate to him and each other. Overshadowing the series is Draper's double life both as to his true identity, and his unfaithfulness to his family, while he tries to maintain a brilliant and charismatic outward appearance.

=== Conception ===
In 2000, while working as a staff writer for Becker, Matthew Weiner wrote the first draft as a spec script for the pilot of what would later be called Mad Men. Television showrunner David Chase recruited Weiner to work as a writer on his HBO series The Sopranos after reading the pilot script in 2002. "It was lively, and it had something new to say," Chase said. "Here was someone [Weiner] who had written a story about advertising in the 1960s, and was looking at recent American history through that prism."

Weiner and his representatives at Industry Entertainment and ICM tried to sell the pilot script to HBO, which expressed an interest, but insisted that David Chase be executive producer. Chase declined, despite his enthusiasm for Weiner's writing and the pilot script. HBO CEO Richard Plepler later became a fan of the show and congratulated AMC on their success with it. In 2017 he named passing on Mad Men as his biggest regret from his time at HBO, calling it "inexcusable" and attributing the decision to "hubris."

Weiner then moved on to Showtime, which also passed. Lacking a suitable network buyer, they tabled sales efforts until years later, when a talent manager on Weiner's team, Ira Liss, pitched the series to AMC Vice President of Development Christina Wayne. "The network was looking for distinction in launching its first original series," according to AMC Networks president Ed Carroll, "and we took a bet that quality would win out over formulaic mass appeal." (Note: Although Mad Men has been called AMC's first original series, it was preceded by the comedy-drama Remember WENN, which ran from 1996 to 1998.)

=== Influences ===
Weiner cited Alfred Hitchcock as a major influence on the series' visual style, especially the film North by Northwest. He was also influenced by director Wong Kar-wai in the music, mise en scène, and editorial style. Weiner noted in an interview that M*A*S*H and Happy Days, two television shows produced in the 1970s about the 1950s, provided a "touchstone for culture" and a way to "remind people that they have a misconception about the past, any past." He also said, "Mad Men would have been some sort of crisp, soapy version of The West Wing if not for The Sopranos." Peggy's "psychic scar for the entire show, after giving away that baby," Weiner said, is "the kind of thing that would have never occurred to me before I was on The Sopranos."

=== Pre-production ===
Tim Hunter, the director of a half-dozen episodes from the show's first two seasons, called Mad Men a "very well-run show." He said:

They have a lot of production meetings during pre-production. The day the script comes in we all meet for a first page turn, and Matt starts telling us how he envisions it. Then there's a "tone" meeting a few days later where Matt tells us how he envisions it. And then there's a final full crew production meeting where Matt again tells us how he envisions it ...

=== Filming and production design ===
The pilot episode began filming on April 20, 2006, and was shot at Silvercup Studios in New York City and various locations around the city; subsequent episodes were filmed at Los Angeles Center Studios. It was available in high definition for showing on AMC HD and on video-on-demand services available from various cable affiliates.

The writers, including Weiner, amassed volumes of research on Mad Men's time period, so as to make most aspects of it—including detailed set design, costume design, and props—historically accurate, producing an authentic visual style that garnered critical praise. On the scenes featuring smoking, Weiner said: "Doing this show without smoking would've been a joke. It would've been sanitary and it would've been phony." Each episode had a budget between US$2–2.5 million; the pilot episode's budget was over $3 million.

Weiner collaborated with cinematographer Phil Abraham and production designers Robert Shaw (who worked on the pilot only) and Dan Bishop to develop a visual style "influenced more by cinema than television." Alan Taylor, a veteran director of The Sopranos, directed the pilot and also helped establish the series's visual tone. To cast an "air of mystery" around Don Draper, Taylor tended to shoot from behind him, or frame him partially obscured. Many scenes set at Sterling Cooper were shot lower-than-eyeline to incorporate the ceilings into the composition of frame, reflecting the photography, graphic design and architecture of the period. Taylor felt that neither steadicam nor handheld camera work would be appropriate to the "visual grammar of that time, and that aesthetic didn't mesh with [their] classic approach"; accordingly, the sets were designed to be practical for dolly work.

=== Finances ===
According to a 2011 Miller Tabak + Company estimate published in Barron's, Lions Gate Entertainment received an estimated $2.71 million from AMC for each episode, a little less than the $2.84 million each episode cost to produce.

In March 2011, after negotiations between the network and the series's creator, AMC picked up Mad Men for a fifth season, which premiered on March 25, 2012. Weiner reportedly signed a $30 million contract which would keep him at the helm of the show for three more seasons. A couple of weeks later, a Marie Claire interview with January Jones was published, noting the limits to that financial success when it comes to the actors: "We don't get paid very much on the show and that's well-documented. On the other hand, when you do television, you have a steady paycheck each week, so that's nice."

Miller Tabak analyst David Joyce wrote that sales from home video and iTunes could amount to $100 million during the show's expected seven-year run, with international syndication sales bringing in an additional estimated $700,000 per episode. That does not include the $71 to $100 million estimated to come from a Netflix streaming video deal announced in April 2011.

=== Episode credit and title sequences ===
The opening title sequence features credits superimposed over a graphic animation of a businessman falling, surrounded by skyscrapers with reflections of period advertising posters and billboards, accompanied by a short edit of the instrumental "A Beautiful Mine" by RJD2. The businessman appears as a black-and-white silhouette. The titles, created by production house Imaginary Forces, pay homage to graphic designer Saul Bass's skyscraper-filled opening titles for Alfred Hitchcock's North by Northwest (1959) and falling man movie poster for Vertigo (1958); Weiner has listed Hitchcock as a major influence on the visual style of the series. In a 2010 issue of TV Guide, the show's opening title sequence ranked No. 9 on a list of TV's top 10 credits sequences, as selected by readers.

David Carbonara composed the original score for the series. Mad Men – Original Score Vol. 1 was released on January 13, 2009. At the end of almost every episode, the show either fades to black or smash cuts to black as period music, or a theme by series composer David Carbonara, plays during the ending credits; at least one episode ends with silence or ambient sounds. A few episodes have ended with more recent popular music, or with a diegetic song dissolving into the credits music.

In a rare instance of their licensing a Beatles recording for a television program, Apple Corps authorized the use of the song "Tomorrow Never Knows" for the Season 5 episode "Lady Lazarus". Lionsgate paid roughly $250,000 for the use of the song in the episode.

=== Crew ===
In addition to creating the series, Matthew Weiner was the showrunner, head writer, and an executive producer; he contributed to each episode through writing or co-writing the scripts, casting various roles, and approving costume and set designs. He was notorious for being selective about all aspects of the series, and maintained a high level of secrecy about production details. Tom Palmer served as a co-executive producer and writer on the first season. Scott Hornbacher (who later became an executive producer), Todd London, Lisa Albert, Andre Jacquemetton, and Maria Jacquemetton were producers on the first season. Palmer, Albert, Andre Jacquemetton, and Maria Jacquemetton were also writers on the first season. Bridget Bedard, Chris Provenzano, and writer's assistant Robin Veith completed the first-season writing team.

Lisa Albert, Andre Jacquemetton and Maria Jacquemetton returned as supervising producers for the second season. Veith also returned and was promoted to staff writer. Hornbacher replaced Palmer as co-executive producer for the second season. Consulting producers David Isaacs, Marti Noxon, Rick Cleveland, and Jane Anderson joined the crew for the second season. Weiner, Albert, Andre Jacquemetton, Maria Jacquemetton, Veith, Noxon, Cleveland, and Anderson were all writers for the second season. New writer's assistant Kater Gordon was the season's other writer. Isaacs, Cleveland, and Anderson left the crew at the end of the second season.

Albert remained a supervising producer for the third season but Andre Jacquemetton and Maria Jacquemetton became consulting producers. Hornbacher was promoted again, this time to executive producer. Veith returned as a story editor and Gordon became a staff writer. Noxon remained a consulting producer and was joined by new consulting producer Frank Pierson. Dahvi Waller joined the crew as a co-producer. Weiner, Albert, Andre Jacquemetton, Maria Jacquemetton, Veith, Noxon, and Waller were all writers for the third season. New writer's assistant Erin Levy, executive story editor Cathryn Humphris, script co-ordinator Brett Johnson and freelance writer Andrew Colville completed the third season writing staff.

Alan Taylor, Phil Abraham, Jennifer Getzinger, Lesli Linka Glatter, Tim Hunter, Andrew Bernstein, and Michael Uppendahl were regular directors for the series. Matthew Weiner directed each of the season finales. Cast members John Slattery, Jared Harris and Jon Hamm also directed episodes.

As of the third season, seven of the nine writers for the show were women, in contrast to Writers Guild of America 2006 statistics that showed male writers outnumbered female writers by 2 to 1. As Maria Jacquemetton noted:

We have a predominately [sic] female writing staff—women from their early 20s to their 50s—and plenty of female department heads and directors. [Show creator] Matt Weiner and [executive producer] Scott Hornbacher hire people they believe in, based on their talent and their experience. "Can you capture this world? Can you bring great storytelling?"

== Cast and characters ==
Mad Men season 5 core cast from left to right: Christina Hendricks, John Slattery, Jared Harris, Vincent Kartheiser, Jon Hamm, Robert Morse, and Elisabeth Moss

- Jon Hamm as Don Draper, the series' protagonist, the creative director and junior partner of Sterling Cooper Advertising Agency and eventually a partner of Sterling Cooper & Partners. He is a hard-drinking, chain-smoking executive with a shadowy past who has achieved success in advertising. He is married to Betty Draper, with whom he has three children: Sally, Bobby, and Gene. He keeps a lot of things hidden from Betty, including his extensive history of adultery. It is revealed early in the series that Draper's real name is Richard "Dick" Whitman. During the Korean War, Whitman assumed the identity of his CO, Lieutenant Don Draper, who was killed during an ambush.
- Elisabeth Moss as Peggy Olson, who rises from being Don's secretary to being a copywriter with her own office.
- Vincent Kartheiser as Pete Campbell, a young, ambitious account executive from an old New York family with connections and a privileged background. He is married to Trudy (Alison Brie) with whom he eventually has a daughter, Tammy.
- January Jones as Betty Draper, Don's wife and mother of their three children. Raised in the Philadelphia suburb of Elkins Park, Pennsylvania and a graduate of Bryn Mawr College, she met Don when she was a model in Manhattan and married him soon thereafter. Over the show's first two seasons, she gradually becomes aware of Don's womanizing.
- Christina Hendricks as Joan Holloway, office manager and head of the secretarial pool at Sterling Cooper. Throughout the series, she has a long-standing affair with Roger Sterling. She eventually rises to the level of partner at Sterling Cooper Draper Pryce and the following SC&P.
- Bryan Batt as Sal Romano (seasons 1–3), the Italian American art director of Sterling Cooper. He is a closeted homosexual reluctant to act upon his homosexuality. He is married to Kitty, who seems unaware of his sexual orientation, yet begins to realize that something is amiss in their relationship.
- Michael Gladis as Paul Kinsey (seasons 1–3; guest season 5), a bearded, pipe-smoking creative copywriter and Princeton University alumnus who prides himself on his politically liberal views.
- Aaron Staton as Ken Cosgrove, a young account executive originally from Vermont. Outside the office, he is an aspiring author who has a short story published in The Atlantic, a source of envy by his co-workers. His wife is Cynthia.
- Rich Sommer as Harry Crane, a bespectacled media buyer and head of Sterling Cooper's television department, which is created at Harry's initiative. Unlike his mostly Ivy League fellows, Harry went to the University of Wisconsin.
- Maggie Siff as Rachel Menken (season 1; guest seasons 2 and 7), the Jewish head of a department store who comes to Sterling Cooper to revamp her business's image. She is initially cool towards Don Draper, who bristles at her assertive, independent image, but they warm to each other and eventually begin an affair.
- John Slattery as Roger Sterling (recurring season 1, main seasons 2–7), one of the two senior partners of Sterling Cooper and mentor to Don Draper. His father founded the firm with Bertram Cooper. Roger is first married to Mona (Talia Balsam) before he divorces her in favor of Don's former secretary, 20-year-old Jane. A World War II Navy veteran, he is a notorious womanizer until two heart attacks change his perspective, although they do not affect his excessive drinking and smoking. His primary function is managing the Lucky Strike account, which is responsible for over half of SCDP's billings.
- Robert Morse as Bert Cooper (recurring seasons 1–2, main seasons 3–7), the somewhat eccentric senior partner at Sterling Cooper. He leaves the day-to-day running of the firm to Roger and Don but is keenly aware of its operations. He is a Republican and is fascinated by Japanese culture, requiring everybody, including clients, to remove their shoes before walking into his office, which is decorated with Japanese art. He is also a fan of the writings of Ayn Rand.
- Jared Harris as Lane Pryce (recurring season 3, main seasons 4–5), the English financial officer installed by Sterling Cooper's new British parent company. His role is that of a strict taskmaster who brings spending under control, in particular by cutting out frivolous expenses. He eventually becomes a founding partner in the new agency, Sterling Cooper Draper Pryce.
- Kiernan Shipka as Sally Draper (recurring seasons 1–3, main seasons 4–7), the eldest child of Don and Betty; her relationship with her mother is often strained. She develops a friendship with Glen, a boy who lives down the street from her.
- Jessica Paré as Megan Calvet (recurring season 4, main seasons 5–7), initially a receptionist at SCDP, who eventually takes over as Don's secretary and is later a junior copy writer. She begins a relationship with Don and they are married by season 5. Later that season, she leaves the firm to pursue her dream of acting. Originally from Montreal, French is her first language.
- Christopher Stanley as Henry Francis (recurring seasons 3–4, main seasons 5–7), a political adviser with close connections to New York Governor Nelson Rockefeller and the Republican Party. It is later revealed that he serves as the Director of Public Relations and Research in the Governor's Office. He develops a romantic relationship with Betty and they later marry.
- Jay R. Ferguson as Stan Rizzo (recurring season 4, main seasons 5–7), the art director at Sterling Cooper Draper Pryce. Before coming to the company, he worked for Lyndon B. Johnson's 1964 Presidential campaign. He and Peggy are often at odds with each other due to his abrasive attitude, although they later develop a strong working relationship.
- Kevin Rahm as Ted Chaough (recurring seasons 4–5, main seasons 6–7), a self-proclaimed rival of Don Draper in the advertising world and partner of his agency, Cutler Gleason and Chaough (CGC).
- Ben Feldman as Michael Ginsberg (recurring season 5, main seasons 6–7), a part-time copywriter by Sterling Cooper Draper Pryce who quickly becomes an essential part of the creative team. Idiosyncratic and socially awkward, he tends to speak his mind, which can be both a help and hindrance to him.
- Mason Vale Cotton as Bobby Draper (recurring seasons 1–5; main seasons 6–7), the middle child of Don and Betty, played by Maxwell Huckabee in season 1, Aaron Hart in seasons 1–2, and Jared Gilmore in seasons 3–4.

== Episodes ==
| Season | Episodes | | Originally released | |
| Season | Episodes | | First released | Last released |
|---|---|---|---|---|
| 1 | 13 | | July 19, 2007 | October 18, 2007 |
| 2 | 13 | | July 27, 2008 | October 26, 2008 |
| 3 | 13 | | August 16, 2009 | November 8, 2009 |
| 4 | 13 | | July 25, 2010 | October 17, 2010 |
| 5 | 13 | | March 25, 2012 | June 10, 2012 |
| 6 | 13 | | April 7, 2013 | June 23, 2013 |
| 7 | 14 | 7 | April 13, 2014 | May 25, 2014 |
| 7 | 14 | 7 | April 5, 2015 | May 17, 2015 |

== Themes and motifs ==
Mad Men depicts parts of American society of the 1960s, including cigarette smoking, drinking, sexism, feminism, adultery, homophobia, and racism. Themes of alienation, social mobility and ruthlessness set the tone of the show. MSNBC noted that the series "mostly remains disconnected from the outside world, so the politics and cultural trends of the time are illustrated through people and their lives, not broad, sweeping arguments".

According to Weiner, he chose the 1960s because:

[E]very time I would try and find something interesting that I wanted to do, it happened in 1960. It will blow your mind if you look at the year on the almanac. And it's not just the election [of JFK]. The pill came out in March 1960, that's really what I wanted it to be around.... That's the largest change in the entire world. Seriously, it's just astounding. Especially if you look at the movies from the 50s. Once it was acceptable to talk about this idea that teenagers were having sex, which they have been doing, obviously, since time immemorial, there were all these movies like Blue Denim and Peyton Place.... [T]he central tension in every movie that does not take place on the battlefield is about a girl getting pregnant. So all of a sudden that entire issue [of pregnancy] has been removed from society. That was what I was interested in in 1960.

=== Identity and memory ===
Television commentators have noted the series's study of identity. This theme is explored most candidly through Don Draper's identity fraud during and after the Korean War, in which he takes on the name of an officer, whom he had accidentally killed, to desert the army and enter a more prestigious and successful lifestyle. Tim Goodman considers identity to be the show's leitmotiv, calling Don Draper "a man who's been living a lie for a long time. He's built to be a loner. And over the course of three seasons we've watched him carry this existential angst through a fairy-tale life of his own creation." As noted by Gawker:

Not only is the agency of Sterling Cooper Draper Pryce in the business of spinning them—or at least warping the truth—to sell product, but the main character, Don Draper, is built on a lie. Just like one of his campaigns, his whole identity is a sweet fabrication, a kind of candy floss spun out of opportunity, innuendo, and straight-up falsehood.

The New Republic writer Ruth Franklin said that "The show's method is to take us behind the scenes of the branding of American icons—Lucky Strike cigarettes, Hilton hotels, Life cereal—to show us not how the products themselves were created, but how their 'very sexy...very magical' images were dreamed up." She went on to say that, "In this way, we are all Don Drapers, obsessed with selling an image rather than tending to what lies underneath. Draper's fatal flaw is his lack of psychological awareness: He is at once perfectly tuned into the desires of America and entirely out of touch with his own character." One reviewer said that "Identity is a key theme in Mad Men, and nobody is ever quite who they appear to be. Each one is filled with thwarted ambitions and frustrated dreams, none more so than Don Draper himself, whose closet, it's gradually revealed over Seasons 1 and 2, is filled with proverbial skeletons."

=== Gender and sexuality ===
The show presents a workplace culture in which it is frequently assumed that female employees are sexually available for their male bosses, and in which jokes about the desirability of one's wife dying are told by husbands in front of their own wives. Most of the main characters have cheated on their wives. Marie Wilson, in an op-ed for The Washington Post, said that:

[I]t is difficult and painful to see the ways in which women and men dealt with each other and with power. It's painful because this behavior is not as far back in our past as we would like to think. Our daughters continually get the messages that power still comes through powerful men. And unfortunately being pretty is still a quality that can get you on the ladder—though it still won't take you to the top.

According to the Los Angeles Times:

[T]he sexism, in particular, is almost suffocating, and not in the least fun to watch. But it's the force against which the most compelling female characters struggle, and the opposition that defines them. The interaction with everyday misogyny and condescension—the housewife whose shrink reports to her husband, the ad woman who's cut out of the after-hours wheeling and dealing—gives the characters purpose and shape.

In Salon, Nelle Engoron argued that while Mad Men seemed to illuminate gender issues, its male characters got off "scot-free" for their drinking and adultery, while the female characters were often punished. Stephanie Coontz of The Washington Post said that women "portrayed the sexism of that era so unflinchingly, they told me, that they could not bear to watch." Some women interviewed mentioned that they had experienced the same "numbness of Betty Draper" and witnessed the "sense of male entitlement similar to Don's."

Aviva Dove-Viebahn wrote that "Mad Men straddles the line between a nuanced portrayal of how sexism and patriarchal entitlement shape lives, careers and social interactions in the 1960s and a glorified rendering of the 'fast-paced, chauvinistic world of 1960s advertising and all that comes with it.'" Melissa Witkowski, writing for The Guardian, argued that Peggy's ascendancy was marred because the show "strongly implies that no woman had ever been a copywriter at Sterling Cooper prior to Peggy, but the circumstances of her promotion imply that this was merely because no woman had ever happened to have shown talent in front of a man before," pointing out that Peggy's career path bore little resemblance to the stories of successful ad women of the time such as Mary Wells Lawrence and Jean Wade Rindlaub. In 2013, the U.S. President Obama said "Peggy Olson gave him insight into how his strong-willed grandmother dealt with life in a man's world."

=== Alcoholism ===
As the show's time progresses into the 1960s, the show portrays a world of liquor-stocked offices, boozy lunches and alcohol-soaked dinners. One incident in Season 2 finds advertising executive Freddy Rumsen being sent to rehab after blacking out and urinating on himself. During the fourth season, Don Draper starts to realize he has an addiction. In the sixties, bad behavior resulting from drinking was often considered macho and even romantic, rather than a result of alcoholism. One reviewer called the fourth season a "sobering tale of drunken excess" as Don Draper struggled with alcoholism.

Ad executive Jerry Della Femina said of the show,

[I]f anything, it's underplayed. There was a tremendous amount of drinking. Three-martini lunches was the norm...while we were still looking at the menu, the third would arrive.... The only thing that saved us was that the clients and agencies that we were going back to drank as much as we did.... Bottles in desk drawers were not the exception but the rule.

=== Counterculture ===
The Los Angeles Times opined that Mad Men excels at "stories of characters fighting to achieve personal liberation in the restless years before the advent of the full-blown culture wars." One reviewer was excited that the fourth season, through Peggy, brought "the introduction to the Counterculture (Andy Warhol as the King of Pop and Leader of the Band), with all the loud music, joint-passing, underground movies so present in those times. Peggy's visit to a loft, with a Life Magazine photo editor-friend, placed her squarely in the center of the exciting creativity so rampant in the underground and also so rebellious against the mainstream." The Huffington Post focused on one scene where "Peggy joins her new beatnik friends in the lobby while Pete stays behind with the SCDP partners to relish...his newly captured $6 million account. As they embark on their opposite trajectories, the camera lingers on their knowing glances. Here is where we find emotional truth."

=== Racism ===
Critics contend that post-racial beliefs complicate the show by only visualizing people of color at work and rarely in their homes or from their point of view. Several writers have argued that the show distorts history by not showing black admen, noting real-life successful African American advertising executives who got their start in the 1960s such as Clarence Holte, Georg Olden, and Caroline Robinson Jones. Latoya Peterson, writing in Slate magazine's Double X, argued that Mad Men was glossing over racial issues.

Slate writer Tanner Colby praised the show's treatment of race and Madison Avenue as historically accurate, especially the storyline in the third season episode "The Fog" in which Pete Campbell's idea to market certain products specifically towards African Americans is struck down by the company. Slate also referred to the fourth season episode, "The Beautiful Girls", in which Don shoots down Peggy Olson's suggestion of Harry Belafonte as a spokesman for Fillmore Auto, after Fillmore Auto faced a boycott for not hiring black employees. Colby also pointed to an exposé published in a 1963 issue of Ad Age that revealed that "out of over 20,000 employees, the report identified only 25 blacks working in any kind of professional or creative capacity, i.e., nonclerical or custodial." Colby wrote, "Mad Men isn't cowardly for avoiding race. Quite the opposite. It's brave for being honest about Madison Avenue's cowardice."

=== Smoking ===
Cigarette smoking, more common in the United States of the 1960s than it is now, is featured throughout the series; many characters can be seen smoking several times over the course of an episode. In the pilot, representatives of Lucky Strike cigarettes come to Sterling Cooper looking for a new advertising campaign in the wake of a Reader's Digest report that smoking will lead to illnesses, including lung cancer. Talk of smoking being harmful to health and physical appearance is usually dismissed or ignored. In the fourth season, after Lucky Strike fires Sterling Cooper Draper Pryce as its ad agency, Draper writes an advertisement in The New York Times titled "Why I'm Quitting Tobacco", which announces SCDP's refusal to take tobacco accounts. The finale finds the agency in talks with the American Cancer Society. In the series's penultimate episode, Betty Draper is diagnosed with terminal lung cancer, after having been depicted as a heavy smoker throughout the series. The actors smoke herbal cigarettes, not tobacco cigarettes; Matthew Weiner said in an interview with The New York Times that the reason is that "you don't want actors smoking real cigarettes. They get agitated and nervous. I've been on sets where people throw up, they've smoked so much."

== Reception ==
=== Critical response ===
Critical response of Mad Men
| Season | Rotten Tomatoes | Metacritic |
|---|---|---|
| 1 | 86% (42 reviews) | 77 (32 reviews) |
| 2 | 100% (27 reviews) | 88 (20 reviews) |
| 3 | 97% (30 reviews) | 87 (20 reviews) |
| 4 | 95% (37 reviews) | 92 (29 reviews) |
| 5 | 97% (38 reviews) | 89 (24 reviews) |
| 6 | 98% (44 reviews) | 88 (28 reviews) |
| 7 | 90% (510 reviews) | 85 (27 reviews) |

Mad Men received critical acclaim throughout its run, and is generally included on critics' lists of the greatest television shows of all time. The American Film Institute selected it as one of the top ten television programs in each year it aired: 2007, 2008, 2009, 2010, 2012, 2013, 2014, and was singled out for the "Special Award" in 2015 to honor the show's final season and legacy. It was named the best television show of 2007 by the Television Critics Association and several national publications, including the Chicago Tribune, The New York Times, the Pittsburgh Post-Gazette, Time, and TV Guide. The show appeared on multiple year-end "most acclaimed" lists published by critics throughout all of its seasons. According to Metacritic's aggregate of such lists, it was the most acclaimed show in 2007, 2008, 2009, 2010, the second most acclaimed in 2012, the fourth most acclaimed in 2013, the seventh most acclaimed in 2014, and the second most acclaimed in 2015.

On the review aggregator website Metacritic, the first season scored 77/100; the second season scored 88/100; the third season scored 87/100; the fourth season scored 92/100; the fifth season scored 89/100; the sixth season scored 88/100; the seventh season, part one scored 85/100; and the seventh season, part two scored 83/100.

A New York Times reviewer called the series groundbreaking for "luxuriating in the not-so-distant past." Regarding season 3, Matthew Gilbert of The Boston Globe wrote "it's an absolutely gorgeous, amber-tinted vision of the early 1960s" and added "detailed with enough 1950s-era accoutrements to seem authentically Camelot." The San Francisco Chronicle called Mad Men "stylized, visually arresting...an adult drama of introspection and the inconvenience of modernity in a man's world."

A Chicago Sun-Times reviewer described the series as an "unsentimental portrayal of complicated 'whole people' who act with the more decent 1960 manners America has lost, while also playing grab-ass and crassly defaming subordinates." The reaction at Entertainment Weekly was similar, noting how in the period in which Mad Men takes place, "play is part of work, sexual banter isn't yet harassment, and America is free of self-doubt, guilt, and countercultural confusion." The Los Angeles Times said that the show had found "a strange and lovely space between nostalgia and political correctness." The show also received critical praise for its historical accuracy – mainly its depictions of gender and racial bias, sexual dynamics in the workplace, and the high prevalence of smoking and drinking.

The Washington Post agreed with most other reviews in regard to Mad Men's visual style, but disliked what was referred to as "lethargic" pacing of the storylines. A review of the first season DVD set in the London Review of Books by Mark Greif was much less laudatory. Greif stated that the series was an "unpleasant little entry in the genre of Now We Know Better" as the cast was a series of historical stereotypes that failed to do anything except "congratulate the present." In a February 2011 review of the show's first four seasons, critic Daniel Mendelsohn wrote a critical review that called Mad Men a "drama with aspirations to treating social and historical 'issues'—the show is melodramatic rather than dramatic."

It was ranked 21st in TV Guide's 2013 list of the 60 best TV series ever, and the Writers Guild of America named it seventh in a list of the 101 best-written shows in the history of television. In 2019, The Guardian, which ranked the show 3rd on its list of the 100 best TV shows of the 21st century, stated that by spanning the entire 60s, Mad Men showed "the mammoth social shifts in an ad agency in minute detail, and became...a meditation on how modern America came to be made, one iconic advert at a time." Rob Sheffield of Rolling Stone called Mad Men "the greatest TV drama of all time." In 2022, Rolling Stone ranked Mad Men as the seventh-greatest TV show of all time. In 2023, Variety chose Mad Men as the #2 greatest TV show of all time. In October 2023, chief critics of The Hollywood Reporter ranked Mad Men the greatest show of the 21st century, stating that "In strange ways, Mad Men was more optimistic than its prestige television cohorts, and in many other ways it was more cynical. Reconciling those two seemingly contradictory impulses over seven seasons was heartbreaking, hilarious, bleak and inspiring, generating a lifetime of instantly recognizable memes, marvelously quotable dialogue and indelible moments."

=== Ratings ===
| Season | Timeslot (ET) | Episodes | Premiered | | Ended | | Average viewers (in millions) |
| Season | Timeslot (ET) | Episodes | Date | Premiere viewers (in millions) | Date | Finale viewers (in millions) | Average viewers (in millions) |
|---|---|---|---|---|---|---|---|
| Season 1 | Thursday 10:00 pm | 13 | July 19, 2007 | 1.65 | October 18, 2007 | 0.93 | 0.90 |
| Season 2 | Sunday 10:00 pm | 13 | July 27, 2008 | 2.06 | October 26, 2008 | 1.75 | 1.52 |
| Season 3 | Sunday 10:00 pm | 13 | August 16, 2009 | 2.76 | November 8, 2009 | 2.32 | 1.80 |
| Season 4 | Sunday 10:00 pm | 13 | July 25, 2010 | 2.90 | October 17, 2010 | 2.44 | 2.27 |
| Season 5 | Sunday 10:00 pm | 13 | March 25, 2012 | 3.54 | June 10, 2012 | 2.70 | 2.61 |
| Season 6 | Sunday 10:00 pm | 13 | April 7, 2013 | 3.37 | June 23, 2013 | 2.69 | 2.49 |
| Season 7, Part 1 | Sunday 10:00 pm | 7 | April 13, 2014 | 2.27 | May 25, 2014 | 1.94 | 2.01 |
| Season 7, Part 2 | Sunday 10:00 pm | 7 | April 5, 2015 | 2.27 | May 17, 2015 | 3.29 | 2.12 |

Viewership for the premiere at 10:00 pm on July 19, 2007, was higher than any other AMC original series at that time, and attained a 1.4 household rating, with 1.2 million households and 1.65 million total viewers. The numbers for the first season premiere were more than doubled for the heavily promoted second season premiere, which received 2.06 million viewers. A major drop in viewership for the episode following the second season premiere prompted concern from some television critics. However, 1.75 million people viewed the second season finale, which was up 20% over the season 2 average, and significantly more than the 926,000 people who viewed the first season finale. The cumulative audience for the episode was 2.9 million viewers, when the two re-broadcasts at 11:00 pm and 1:00 am were factored in.

The third season premiere, which aired August 16, 2009, garnered 2.8 million views on its first run, and 0.78 million with the 11:00 pm and 1:00 am repeats. In 2009, Mad Men was second in Nielsen's list of Top 10 timeshifted primetime TV programs, with a 57.7% gain in viewers, second only to the final season of Battlestar Galactica.

The fourth season premiere received 2.9 million viewers, and was up five percent from the ratings for the debut of season 3 and up 61 percent from the third season average, and became the most watched-episode in AMC history until its fifth season premiere, and later, the series premieres of The Walking Dead and Better Call Saul.

The fifth season premiere, "A Little Kiss", was the most watched episode of Mad Men of all time to date, receiving 3.54 million viewers and 1.6 million viewers in the 18–49 demographic. Before the fifth season, Mad Men had never achieved above a 1.0 in the 18–49 demographic. Charlie Collier, AMC's president, said that:

For each of the five Mad Men seasons Matthew Weiner and his team have crafted a beautifully told story and each season a larger audience has responded; a rare accomplishment. We couldn't be more proud of this program, the brilliant writers, cast and crew, and the entire team on each side of the camera.

The fifth season finale, "The Phantom", was watched by 2.7 million viewers, which was the highest ratings for a Mad Men finale until the series finale aired on May 17, 2015. In 2012, the series was second in Nielsen's list of Top 10 timeshifted primetime TV programs, with a 127% gain in viewers.

On April 7, 2013, the sixth season premiered to 3.37 million viewers, and 1.1 adults 18–49. This was down from the fifth season premiere, but up from the fifth season finale. The sixth season finale on June 23, 2013, attracted 2.69 million total viewers, and achieved 0.9 adults 18–49 demographic rating; on par with the fifth season finale. This helped bring the season average up to 2.49 million viewers, down just slightly from the season five average.

The first part of the seventh season, titled "The Beginning", premiered on April 13, 2014, and garnered 2.27 million total viewers and 0.8 adults 18–49 rating. This was down 48 percent in viewers and 38 percent in adults 18–49 from the sixth season premiere, and down from the sixth season finale. The first part of season seven concluded on May 25, 2014, to 1.94 million viewers and a 0.7 adults 18–49 rating, down in both from the season 6 finale. This brought the average for the first part of the season down to 2.01 million viewers. The second part of season seven, titled "The End of an Era", premiered on April 5, 2015, to 2.27 million viewers and a 0.8 adults 18–49 rating; identical to the season 7 premiere. The series finale of Mad Men aired on May 17, 2015, to 3.29 million viewers and 1.1 adults 18–49 rating. 1.7 millions of these viewers were aged 25–54, and 1.4 million were ages 18–49, making it the highest viewed and highest rated episode since the sixth season premiere. This episode brought up the part two average to 2.12 million viewers, and brought up the overall season seven average to 2.06 million viewers.

=== Authenticity ===
With Mad Men, Weiner and his creative team have "received critical acclaim for its historical authenticity and visual style" although opinions on Mad Men vary among people who worked in advertising during the 1960s. According to Robert Levinson, a consultant for Mad Men who worked at BBDO from 1960 to 1980, "what [Matthew Weiner] captured was so real. The drinking was commonplace, the smoking was constant, the relationships between the executives and the secretaries was exactly right". Jerry Della Femina, who worked as a copywriter in that era and later founded his own agency, said that the show is accurate in its depiction of "the smoking, the prejudice and the bigotry".

Allen Rosenshine, a copywriter who went on to lead BBDO, called the show a "total fabrication", saying that "if anybody talked to women the way these goons do, they'd have been out on their ass". George Lois, who worked at Doyle Dane Bernbach for a year, before starting his own ad agency in 1960, said:

Mad Men is nothing more than the fulfilment of every possible stereotype of the early 1960s bundled up nicely to convince consumers that the sort of morally repugnant behavior exhibited by its characters...is glamorous and vintage.... [U]nlike the TV 'Mad Men,' we worked full, exhausting, joyous days: pitching new business, creating ideas, "comping" them up, storyboarding them, selling them, photographing them, and directing commercials. And our only 'extracurricular activity' was chasing fly balls and dunking basketballs on our agency softball and basketball teams!

Andrew Cracknell, author of The Real Mad Men: The Renegades of Madison Avenue and the Golden Age of Advertising, also thought the show lacked authenticity, stating, "One thing of which they [...] are all equally contemptuous", in regards to the industry's elite, "is the output of Sterling Cooper. But then they have every right. None of them would ever have wanted to work for Draper and none of his departments would have got a job at any of their agencies. Particularly Draper himself. Too phony."

According to an analysis of the language used in Mad Men by Benjamin Schmidt, a visiting graduate fellow at the Cultural Observatory at Harvard University, the vocabulary and phrases used in the show are not all quite authentic to the period, despite attempts to use contemporary vocabulary. Using a computer program, he determined that the show uses relatively few words that are clearly anachronistic but that there are many words and phrases used that are far more common in modern speech, than in the speech of the era ("need to", "feel good about", "euthanize", etc.). In aggregate these words and constructions give a misleading impression of the speech patterns of the time. He notes that the use of modern business language (leverage, signing bonus, etc.) unknown or little used at the time "creeps in with striking regularity."

=== Legacy and influence ===
Mad Men is widely considered one of the most influential shows in the medium's history and has had an enduring impact on modern television. It raised the profile of AMC, and it was the first series on basic cable to win the Primetime Emmy Award for Outstanding Drama Series, winning a record four times, tied only with Hill Street Blues, L.A. Law, The West Wing and Game of Thrones for most wins in that category. Mad Men's success allowed AMC to greenlight other series, such as Breaking Bad, and it also inspired several other networks to launch their own prestige drama series. As a result, many TV critics credit Mad Men and AMC with starting a new wave of Peak TV. Many elements of the show were commended including its unique episode and season structures, subtle and atmospheric tone, exploration of feminism, attention to detail and its overall approach regarding history.

Mad Men also inspired several other TV shows during its run. The 2009 TNT series Trust Me, which ran for one season, was set at a modern-day advertising agency; television critic Tom Shales called it a cross between Mad Men and another television show, Nip/Tuck. Two network television series that premiered in 2011, the short-lived The Playboy Club and the one-season Pan Am, both set in 1963, were frequently referred to as imitations of Mad Men. The British TV drama The Hour, which also premiered in 2011, and is set in 1956, was also described as influenced by Mad Men. The 2014 Syfy miniseries Ascension was described as "Mad Men in space". Several other shows have been compared to and said to have been influenced by Mad Men as well, including The Americans, Halt and Catch Fire, The Marvelous Mrs. Maisel, Boardwalk Empire, and BoJack Horseman, amongst many others. Don Draper's rendition of the Frank O'Hara poem "Mayakovsky" from Meditations in an Emergency, at the end of "For Those Who Think Young" (season two, episode one), led to the poet's work entering the top 50 sales on Amazon.com.

Mad Men was credited with setting off a wave of renewed interest in the fashion and culture of the early 1960s. According to The Guardian in 2008, the show was responsible for a revival in men's suits, especially suits resembling those of that period, with higher waistbands and shorter jackets; as well as "everything from tortoise shell glasses to fedoras." According to the website BabyCenter, the show led to the name "Betty" soaring in popularity for baby girls in the United States in 2010. According to The Arizona Republic, a resurgence in interest for Mid-century modern furnishings and decor also coincided with the emergence of the show. New York Times theater critic Ben Brantley wrote in 2011 that the success of Mad Men had turned "the booze-guzzling, chain-smoking, babe-chasing 1960s" into "Broadway's decade du jour", citing three 1960s-set musicals that had appeared on Broadway in the past year: revivals of Promises, Promises and How to Succeed in Business Without Really Trying, and a new musical, Catch Me If You Can. Brantley also wrote, "I'm presuming that Mad Men is the reason this Promises, Promises is set not in the late '60s, as the original was, but in 1962."

The appearance of Christina Hendricks as office manager Joan, is said to have sparked a renewed interest in a voluptuous look for women and to be partly responsible for, among other things, a 10 percent increase in breast augmentation in the United Kingdom in 2010.

The nostalgia for the fashions and social norms of the early 1960s engendered by Mad Men was criticized by some commentators. Amy Benfer, writing in 2009 for Salon, asked, "But isn't it a little odd that a show that, among other things, warns about the dangers of seeing the past in too amber a light has spawned an industry devoted to fetishizing nostalgia for that same flawed past?"

In the 2014 State of the Union Address, President Barack Obama, in speaking out against unequal pay for women, said "It's time to do away with workplace policies that belong in a Mad Men episode." Matthew Weiner released a statement saying that he "supports the president", and that he was "honored that our show is part of a much-needed national conversation". In 2015, a sculpture of a bench dedicated to Mad Men featuring the image of Don Draper from the opening credit sequence was unveiled in front of the Time-Life Building.

=== Awards and accolades ===
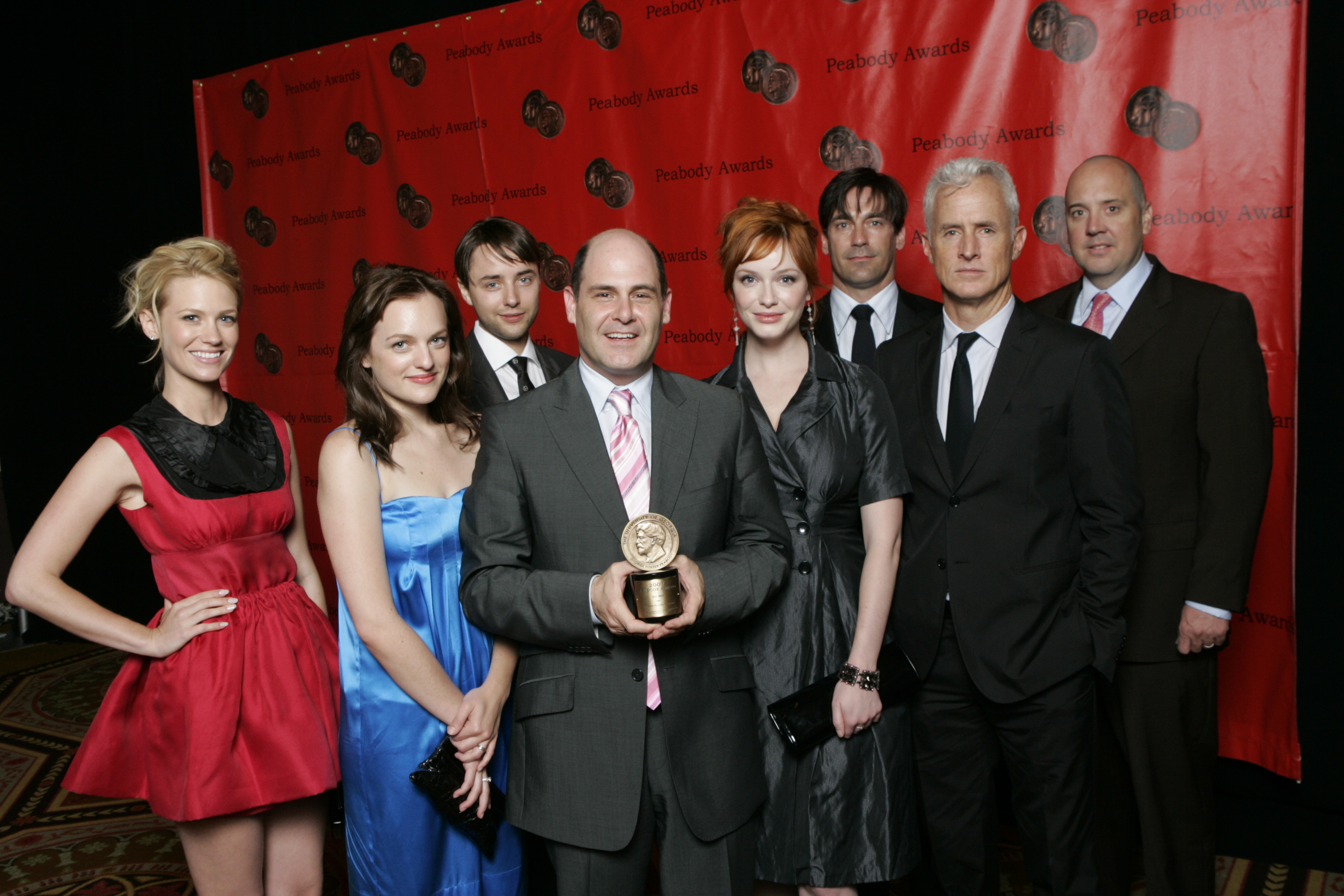
Matthew Weiner and the cast of Mad Men at the 67th Annual Peabody Awards

Mad Men was the recipient of many nominations and awards from various organizations, including the American Film Institute, Emmys and Creative Arts Emmys from the Academy of Television Arts & Sciences, a Peabody Award from the Peabody Board at the Grady College of Journalism and Mass Communication, Satellite Awards from the International Press Academy, and British Academy Television Awards from the British Academy of Film and Television Arts. Numerous nominations and award were also received from guilds and societies such as the Art Directors Guild, Casting Society of America, Cinema Audio Society, Costume Designers Guild, Directors Guild of America, Motion Picture Sound Editors, Producers Guild of America, Screen Actors Guild, Television Critics Association and Writers Guild of America.

Award highlights include winning the Primetime Emmy Award for Outstanding Drama Series four times, for each of its first four seasons; its fourth win tied the record for serial dramas set earlier by Hill Street Blues (1981–84), L.A. Law (1987, 1989–91), and The West Wing (2000–03). In 2012, Mad Men set a record for the most Emmy nominations, 17, without winning. A 2015 The Hollywood Reporter survey of 2,800 actors, producers, directors, and other industry people named it as their #9 favorite show.

== Marketing ==
=== Season premiere campaigns ===
In promotions for the series, AMC aired commercials and a behind-the-scenes documentary on the making of Mad Men before its premiere. The commercials mostly show the one (usually brief) sex scene from each episode of the season. The commercials, as well as the documentary, featured the song "You Know I'm No Good" by Amy Winehouse. The documentary, in addition to trailers and sneak peeks of upcoming episodes, were released on the official AMC website. Mad Men was also made available at the iTunes Store on July 20, 2007, along with the "making of" documentary.

For the second season, AMC undertook the largest marketing campaign it had ever launched, intending to reflect the "cinematic quality" of the series. The Grand Central Terminal subway shuttle to Times Square was decorated with life-size posters of Jon Hamm as Don Draper, and quotes from the first season. Inside Grand Central, groups of people dressed in period clothing would hand out "Sterling Cooper" business cards to promote the July 27 season premiere. Window displays were arranged at 14 Bloomingdale's stores for exhibition throughout July, and a 45' by 100' wallscape was posted at the corner of Hollywood and Highland in downtown Hollywood. Television commercials on various cable and local networks, full-page print ads, and a 30-second trailer in Landmark Theaters throughout July were also run in promotion of the series. Television promotions for the second season featured the song "The Truth" by Handsome Boy Modeling School.

The advertising campaign for the fifth season of Mad Men was conceived by the network as a way to promote the series after the 17-month break between seasons. A teaser campaign began in which posters, using images of the enigmatic "falling man" from the opening credits, were spread out on buildings in New York and Los Angeles. The New York Times ran a story about the image's similarity to the 9/11 falling man image. Some 9/11 victims' family members accused the campaign of being insensitive. However, one family member accused the paper of creating a "kerfuffle where none exists", as well as using 9/11 family members to "write a story that refers only to your own feelings". AMC responded with a statement that said, "The image of Don Draper tumbling through space has been used since the show began in 2007 to represent a man whose life is in turmoil. The image used in the campaign is intended to serve as a metaphor for what is happening in Don Draper's fictional life and in no way references actual events."

The advertising campaign also included the use of posters that proclaimed, "Adultery Is Back." The Atlantic Wire criticized the AMC campaign, saying "Not that we're some creaky old traditionalists who value monogamy above all else, but making that of all things the selling point for a brilliant, beautiful show seems a little silly."

=== Online promotion ===
Promotion for Seasons 4 and 5 saw Mad Men and AMC partnering with Banana Republic for the Mad Men Casting Call, in which users submit photos of themselves in Mad Men style and one winner receives the opportunity for a walk-on role in an upcoming season. Promotion for Seasons 3 and 4 included "Mad Men Yourself", an interactive game in which the user can choose clothing and accessories for an avatar similar to the appearance of Mad Men characters, drawn in the sixties-inspired style of illustrator Dyna Moe. "Mad Men Cocktail Culture" was also featured, an iPhone app that challenges users to create the perfect drink as featured in Mad Men episodes. Another interactive game launched prior to Season 3, the "Sterling Cooper Draper Pryce Job Interview", allowed users to answer questions based on various scenarios and then offered them a position in the Sterling Cooper Draper Pryce office. Season 3 also included "Which Mad Man Are You?", an interactive game in which users could find out which Mad Men character they were most like based on their answers to questions about various work and life situations. Users can take trivia quizzes based on the years in which the Mad Men episodes take place and find recipes for 1960s-era drinks on the Mad Men Cocktail Guide. AMC's Mad Men website also features exclusive sneak peek and behind the scenes videos, episodic and behind-the-scenes photo galleries, episode and character guides, a blog, and a community forum.

=== Home media ===
| DVD/Blu-ray release | Episodes | Originally aired | Release date | | |
| DVD/Blu-ray release | Episodes | Originally aired | Region 1 | Region 2 | Region 4 |
|---|---|---|---|---|---|
| Season One | 13 | 2007 | July 1, 2008 | June 30, 2008 | November 26, 2008 |
| Season Two | 13 | 2008 | July 14, 2009 | July 13, 2009 | August 19, 2009 |
| Season Three | 13 | 2009 | March 23, 2010 | April 26, 2010 | June 2, 2010 |
| Season Four | 13 | 2010 | March 29, 2011 | March 28, 2011 | April 6, 2011 |
| Season Five | 13 | 2012 | October 16, 2012 | November 5, 2012 | November 14, 2012 |
| Season Six | 13 | 2013 | November 5, 2013 | November 4, 2013 | November 7, 2013 |
| The Final Season, Part 1 | 7 | 2014 | October 21, 2014 | November 3, 2014 | November 6, 2014 |
| The Final Season, Part 2 | 7 | 2015 | October 13, 2015 | October 19, 2015 | November 5, 2015 |

Inspired by the iconic Zippo brand, the DVD box set of the first season of Mad Men was designed like a flip-open Zippo lighter; Zippo subsequently developed two designs of lighters with "Mad Men" logos to be sold at the company headquarters and online. The DVD box set, as well as a Blu-ray disc set, was released July 1, 2008; it features a total of 23 audio commentaries on the season's 13 episodes from various members of the cast and crew.

The 4K transfer of the series was released by HBO Max on December 1, 2025. The transfer was criticized for its lack of post-production edits, especially in one scene where a crew member holding a hose containing fake vomit was visible. A few days after the 4k transfer was released on HBO Max, the episodes with errors were corrected.

=== Licensed merchandise ===
For the third season, the clothing store Banana Republic partnered with Mad Men to create window displays at its U.S. stores, showing clothing inspired by the fashion of the show. The store also ran a "casting call" competition, in which participants were asked to mail photos of themselves in period fashion for a chance at a walk-on part in the show; two winners were announced in October 2010.

Another clothing promotion from the series's third season includes a "Mad-Men Edition" suit offered by American clothing retailer Brooks Brothers. The suit is designed by the show's costume designer, Janie Bryant, and is based on an actual style sold by Brooks Brothers in the early 1960s.

In spring 2010, Mattel released a series of limited-edition collectible Barbie and Ken dolls based on the characters Don and Betty Draper, Joan Holloway, and Roger Sterling.

The fourth season saw the announcement of a collaboration between Janie Bryant and Californian-based company, Nailtini, to produce a limited-edition line of Mad Men nail polish. The four shades are entitled Bourbon Satin, French 75, Deauville and Stinger and are reported to have been inspired by the fabrics used to make cocktail dresses in the 1960s. The Mad Men nail polish line went on sale in the U.S. in late 2010.

== Advertisements and product placement ==
Mad Men featured a significant number of products and brands that existed both in the 1960s and at the time of airing, many of them shown as advertising clients, including Lucky Strike, Bethlehem Steel, Heineken, Volkswagen, Cadillac, Playtex, Chanel, Spam, Utz, Maidenform, Gillette, American Airlines and Clearasil. This led to widespread speculation that many or all of the products and brands on the show were the result of paid product placement. In fact, nearly all real products featured were included solely for purposes of realism, with no product placement deals behind them. Showrunner Matthew Weiner said in an interview: "There is very little [product placement], and it is an illusion that is propagated by the network to try and get more business. It never works out ... Literally I've named four [paid placements] in four seasons and there have probably been a hundred products on the show. Half of them are made up, no one's paying to be on the show." According to Weiner, the companies that did pay for product placement are Jack Daniel's, Heineken, Unilever, and Hilton, though the last was only a payment of gratitude after a storyline involving Hilton had already aired.

Jack Daniel's was mentioned by name in the fifth episode. Soon afterward, the consumer-rights activist group Commercial Alert filed a complaint with the United States Distilled Spirits Council alleging that Jack Daniel's was violating liquor advertising standards since the show features "depictions of overt sexual activity" as well as irresponsible intoxication.

Heineken is seen in the show as a client seeking to bring its beer to the attention of American consumers. Heineken was also the sole advertiser for the U.S. premiere of the last episode of Season 2, which featured only one commercial.

During the fourth season, Unilever created a series of six retro commercials that were aired during the show in the United States. The ads are set at the fictional Smith Winter Mitchell advertising agency and take place during the same time period as Mad Men. The products discussed in the ads are Dove, Breyers, Hellmann's, Klondike, Suave, and Vaseline.

Weiner stated that he was not opposed to product placement, if it can increase a show's budget or eliminate advertising breaks. However, he found the product placement for Mad Men to be a frustrating experience: he called the Heineken deal "a disaster" because Heineken's legal department objected to depictions of irresponsible drinking in the show, and he said he was "disgusted" by the Unilever commercials, which were filmed on the Mad Men set against his will. Because of these frustrations, Weiner stated in 2012 that he would "never again" agree to product placement for Mad Men.

In two cases, the show made use of real ads or ad slogans; these happened to be the first and last ads shown on Mad Men. In the first episode, Don Draper comes up with the slogan "It's Toasted" for Lucky Strike; this was a real slogan used by the brand, albeit one that in real life was coined in 1917. In the series finale, it is implied that Don created the famous 1971 Coca-Cola commercial known as "Hilltop". The series did not have to pay for the use of this ad. Other ads that appeared on the show have some similarities to actual ads from the time.

In 2017, Heinz ran an advertising campaign that used ads created for the brand by Don Draper in a 2013 episode.
