= List of awards and nominations received by Mad Men =

Awards and nominations received by Mad Men
Awards and nominations
Award	Wins	Nominations
American Cinema Editors Awards	1	3
American Film Institute Awards	8	8
American Society of Cinematographers Awards	0	2
Art Directors Guild Awards	4	7
Artios Awards	2	5
ASCAP Film and Television Music Awards	1	1
ASTRA Awards	1	2
British Academy Television Awards	2	3
California On Location Awards	1	2
Cinema Audio Society Awards	1	3
Costume Designers Guild Awards	2	6
Critics' Choice Television Awards	4	11
Crystal + Lucy Awards	1	1
Directors Guild of America Awards	2	9
Dorian Awards	0	11
GLAAD Media Awards	0	1
Golden Globe Awards	5	13
Golden Reel Awards	0	3
Golden Trailer Awards	1	1
Guild of Music Supervisors Awards	0	1
Hollywood Music in Media Awards	0	1
Hollywood Post Alliance Awards	1	4
Make-Up Artists and Hair Stylists Guild Awards	0	2
Peabody Awards	1	1
Primetime Emmy Awards	16	116
Producers Guild of America Awards	3	6
Royal Television Society Awards	1	1
Satellite Awards	1	17
Screen Actors Guild Awards	2	14
Society of Camera Operators Awards	1	1
Television Critics Association Awards	7	17
Women's Image Network Awards	1	1
Writers Guild of America Awards	7	16
Young Artist Awards	2	7

Totals (Note: Certain award groups do not simply award one winner. They acknowledge several different recipients, have runners-up, and have third place. Since this is a specific recognition and is different from losing an award, runner-up mentions are considered wins in this award tally. For simplification and to avoid errors, each award in this list has been presumed to have had a prior nomination.)
- Wins: 79
- Nominations: 297

Mad Men is an American period drama television series created by Matthew Weiner, produced by Lionsgate Television and broadcast on the cable network AMC. It premiered on July 19, 2007, and ended on May 17, 2015, after seven seasons and ninety-two episodes. Set in New York City amid the social changes of the 1960s, the show follows the people working at an advertising agency on Madison Avenue. It stars Jon Hamm as Don Draper, an advertising executive at the fictional Sterling Cooper agency (later Sterling Cooper Draper Pryce) who, despite his professional successes, struggles to handle secrets from his past and to maintain his personal and family life. Other members of the show's original ensemble cast include Elisabeth Moss as Peggy Olson, Vincent Kartheiser as Pete Campbell, January Jones as Betty Draper, Christina Hendricks as Joan Holloway, and John Slattery as Roger Sterling; the cast saw numerous changes during its run.

Mad Men has been widely praised as one of the greatest television series of its era and of all time, and during its run, it earned numerous accolades for its acting, writing, directing, and technical achievements. Among these recognitions, it won sixteen Primetime Emmy Awards from 116 nominations. The series won the award for Outstanding Drama Series four times from eight nominations, tying the record for most wins in the category. (Note: While the show only aired seven seasons, it was eligible for Emmys at eight ceremonies because the final season was split into two parts.) Its win in 2008 for its first season made it the first basic cable series to win the award. Hamm was also nominated eight times for Outstanding Lead Actor in a Drama Series, ultimately winning the award once in 2015. However, despite these successes, the show often came up notably empty-handed; its seventeen nominations without a win in 2012 set an Emmys record for largest shutout in a year, (Note: This record was later surpassed by The Handmaid's Tale, which earned twenty-one nominations without a win in 2021.) and Hamm's win in 2015 was the show's only acting win from thirty-seven nominations.

Other accolades for Mad Men include five Golden Globe Awards from thirteen nominations. Its three wins for Best Television Series – Drama are tied for the record for most wins in the category. The show won the Television Critics Association Award for Program of the Year in 2008, in addition to three wins for Outstanding Achievement in Drama and two wins for Individual Achievement in Drama for Hamm. In 2011, it won the inaugural Critics' Choice Television Award for Best Drama Series. The series also won seven Writers Guild of America Awards – including four wins for Dramatic Series and two wins for Episodic Drama – two Directors Guild of America Awards, and three Producers Guild of America Awards. It won two Screen Actors Guild Awards, both for Outstanding Performance by an Ensemble in a Drama Series. In 2008, the series received a Peabody Award, recognizing it as one of the best productions in electronic media.

== Awards and nominations ==
Awards and nominations received by Mad Men
Award	Year (Note: The listed year refers to the date of the ceremony, not necessarily the year in which the corresponding season or episode aired.)	Category	Nominee(s)	Result	Ref.
American Cinema Editors Awards	2013	Best Edited One-Hour Series for Commercial Television	Tom Wilson (for "The Other Woman")	Nominated	
American Cinema Editors Awards	2015	Best Edited One-Hour Series for Commercial Television	Christopher Gay (for "Waterloo")	Nominated	
American Cinema Editors Awards	2016	Best Edited One-Hour Series for Commercial Television	Tom Wilson (for "Person to Person")	Won	
American Film Institute Awards	2007	Television Programs of the Year	Mad Men	Won	
American Film Institute Awards	2008	Television Programs of the Year	Mad Men	Won	
American Film Institute Awards	2009	Television Programs of the Year	Mad Men	Won	
American Film Institute Awards	2010	Television Programs of the Year	Mad Men	Won	
American Film Institute Awards	2012	Television Programs of the Year	Mad Men	Won	
American Film Institute Awards	2013	Television Programs of the Year	Mad Men	Won	
American Film Institute Awards	2014	Television Programs of the Year	Mad Men	Won	
American Film Institute Awards	2015	AFI Special Award	Mad Men	Won	
American Society of Cinematographers Awards	2011	Regular Series One Episode/Pilot	Christopher Manley (for "Blowing Smoke")	Nominated	
American Society of Cinematographers Awards	2013	Regular Series One-Hour Television	Christopher Manley (for "The Phantom")	Nominated	
Art Directors Guild Awards	2008	Single-Camera Television Series	Dan Bishop (for "Shoot") (Note: Additional nominee: Christopher Brown (art director))	Won	
Art Directors Guild Awards	2009	One-Hour Single-Camera Television Series	Dan Bishop (for "The Jet Set") (Note: Additional nominees: Christopher Brown (art director); Shanna Starzyk (assistant art director); Camille Bratkowski (set designer); Robin Richesson (graphic designer))	Won	
Art Directors Guild Awards	2010	One-Hour Single-Camera Television Series	Dan Bishop (for "Souvenir") (Note: Additional nominees: Christopher Brown (art director); Shanna Starzyk (assistant art director); Robin Richesson (illustrator); Camille Bratkowski (set designer); Geoffrey Mandel (graphic designer); Amy Wells (set decorator))	Won	
Art Directors Guild Awards	2011	One-Hour Single-Camera Television Series	Dan Bishop (for "Public Relations") (Note: Additional nominees: Christopher Brown (art director); Shanna Starzyk (assistant art director); Camille Bratkowski (set designer); Geoffrey Mandel (graphic designer); Claudette Didul (set decorator))	Won	
Art Directors Guild Awards	2014	One-Hour Single-Camera Television Series	Dan Bishop (for "The Better Half") (Note: Additional nominees: Christopher Brown (art director); Shanna Starzyk (assistant art director); Evan Regester (graphic designer); Camille Bratkowski (set designer); Claudette Didul (set decorator))	Nominated	
Art Directors Guild Awards	2015	One-Hour Period or Fantasy Single-Camera Series	Dan Bishop (for "Time Zones") (Note: Additional nominees: Shanna Starzyck (art director); Andrew Hull (assistant art director); Camille Bratkowski (set designer); Evan Regester (graphic designer); Claudette Didul (set decorator))	Nominated	
Art Directors Guild Awards	2016	One-Hour Period or Fantasy Single-Camera Series	Dan Bishop (for "Person to Person") (Note: Additional nominees: Shanna Starzyck (art director); Andy Hull (assistant art director); Evan Regester (graphic designer); Camille Bratkowski (set designer); Claudette Didul (set decorator))	Nominated	
Artios Awards	2008	Outstanding Casting – Television Pilot, Drama	Beth Bowling and Kim Miscia	Won	
Artios Awards	2009	Outstanding Casting – Television Series, Drama	Laura Schiff and Carrie Audino	Won	
Artios Awards	2010	Outstanding Casting – Television Series, Drama	Laura Schiff and Carrie Audino	Nominated	
Artios Awards	2011	Outstanding Casting – Television Series, Drama	Carrie Audino and Laura Schiff	Nominated	
Artios Awards	2012	Outstanding Casting – Television Series, Drama	Laura Schiff, Carrie Audino, and Kendra Shay Clark	Nominated	
ASCAP Film and Television Music Awards	2009	Top Television Series	David Carbonara, Edwin Hayes, and Ramble Krohn	Won	
ASTRA Awards	2008	Most Outstanding International Program or Event	Mad Men	Nominated	
ASTRA Awards	2009	Most Outstanding International Program or Event	Mad Men	Won	
British Academy Television Awards	2009	Best International Show	Mad Men (Note: Nominees: Matthew Weiner and Scott Hornbacher)	Won	
British Academy Television Awards	2010	Best International Show	Mad Men (Note: Nominees: Matthew Weiner and Scott Hornbacher)	Won	
British Academy Television Awards	2011	Best International Show	Mad Men (Note: Nominees: Matthew Weiner, Scott Hornbacher, and Jennifer Getzinger)	Nominated	
California On Location Awards	2014	Location Professional of the Year – Episodic Television, Full Season	Scott Poole	Won	
California On Location Awards	2015	Location Team of the Year – Television, One Hour	Scott Poole, Kevin Danchisko, Tristan Daoussis, and Gavin Glennon	Nominated	
Cinema Audio Society Awards	2009	Outstanding Achievement in Sound Mixing for Television Series	Peter Bentley, Ken Teaney, and Geoffrey Rubay (for "The Jet Set")	Nominated	
Cinema Audio Society Awards	2010	Outstanding Achievement in Sound Mixing for Television Series	Peter Bentley, Ken Teaney, and Todd Orr (for "Guy Walks Into an Advertising Agency")	Won	
Cinema Audio Society Awards	2013	Outstanding Achievement in Sound Mixing for Television Series – One Hour	Peter Bentley, Ken Teaney, and Alec St. John (for "Commissions and Fees")	Nominated	
Costume Designers Guild Awards	2009	Outstanding Period/Fantasy Television Series	Janie Bryant	Won	
Costume Designers Guild Awards	2010	Outstanding Period/Fantasy Television Series	Janie Bryant	Won	
Costume Designers Guild Awards	2011	Outstanding Period/Fantasy Television Series	Janie Bryant	Nominated	
Costume Designers Guild Awards	2014	Outstanding Period/Fantasy Television Series	Janie Bryant	Nominated	
Costume Designers Guild Awards	2015	Outstanding Period/Fantasy Television Series	Janie Bryant	Nominated	
Costume Designers Guild Awards	2016	Outstanding Period Television Series	Janie Bryant and Tiffany White Stanton	Nominated	
Critics' Choice Television Awards	2011	Best Drama Series	Mad Men	Won	
Critics' Choice Television Awards	2011	Best Actor in a Drama Series	Jon Hamm	Won	
Critics' Choice Television Awards	2011	Best Actress in a Drama Series	Elisabeth Moss	Nominated	
Critics' Choice Television Awards	2011	Best Supporting Actor in a Drama Series	John Slattery	Nominated	
Critics' Choice Television Awards	2011	Best Supporting Actress in a Drama Series	Christina Hendricks	Won (Note: Tied with Margo Martindale for Justified)	
Critics' Choice Television Awards	2012	Best Drama Series	Mad Men	Nominated	
Critics' Choice Television Awards	2012	Best Actor in a Drama Series	Jon Hamm	Nominated	
Critics' Choice Television Awards	2012	Best Actress in a Drama Series	Elisabeth Moss	Nominated	
Critics' Choice Television Awards	2012	Best Supporting Actor in a Drama Series	John Slattery	Nominated	
Critics' Choice Television Awards	2012	Best Supporting Actress in a Drama Series	Christina Hendricks	Won	
Critics' Choice Television Awards	2013	Best Actress in a Drama Series	Elisabeth Moss	Nominated	
Crystal + Lucy Awards	2013	Lucy Award	Christina Hendricks, January Jones, Elisabeth Moss, Jessica Paré, and Kiernan Shipka	Won	
Directors Guild of America Awards	2008	Outstanding Directorial Achievement in Dramatic Series	Alan Taylor (for "Smoke Gets in Your Eyes") (Note: Additional nominees: Scott Hornbacher (unit production manager); Mark McGann (first assistant director); Maggie Murphy (second assistant director); John Silvestri (second second assistant director); April Taylor (second assistant director/location manager))	Won	
Directors Guild of America Awards	2009	Outstanding Directorial Achievement in Dramatic Series	Alan Taylor (for "The Mountain King") (Note: Additional nominees: Dwayne Shattuck (unit production manager); Sean Hobin (first assistant director); Lisa Rowe (second assistant director); Jonathon Miller (second second assistant director))	Nominated	
Directors Guild of America Awards	2009	Outstanding Directorial Achievement in Dramatic Series	Matthew Weiner (for "Meditations in an Emergency") (Note: Additional nominees: Dwayne Shattuck (unit production manager); Nina Jack (first assistant director); Xochi Blymyer (second assistant director); Jonathon Miller (second second assistant director))	Nominated	
Directors Guild of America Awards	2010	Outstanding Directorial Achievement in Dramatic Series	Jennifer Getzinger (for "The Gypsy and the Hobo") (Note: Additional nominees: Dwayne Shattuck (unit production manager); Nina Jack (first assistant director); Karen Radzikowski (second assistant director); Marc Newland (second second assistant director))	Nominated	
Directors Guild of America Awards	2010	Outstanding Directorial Achievement in Dramatic Series	Lesli Linka Glatter (for "Guy Walks Into an Advertising Agency") (Note: Additional nominees: Dwayne Shattuck (unit production manager); Adam Ben Frank (first assistant director); Jessica L. Lowrey (second assistant director); Elion S. Olson (second second assistant director))	Won	
Directors Guild of America Awards	2010	Outstanding Directorial Achievement in Dramatic Series	Matthew Weiner (for "Shut the Door. Have a Seat.") (Note: Additional nominees: Dwayne Shattuck (unit production manager); Nina Jack (first assistant director); Karen Radzikowski (second assistant director); Marc Newland (second second assistant director))	Nominated	
Directors Guild of America Awards	2011	Outstanding Directorial Achievement in Dramatic Series	Jennifer Getzinger (for "The Suitcase") (Note: Additional nominees: Dwayne Shattuck (unit production manager); Nina Jack (first assistant director); Karen Radzikowski (second assistant director); Rachel Caproni (second second assistant director))	Nominated	
Directors Guild of America Awards	2013	Outstanding Directorial Achievement in Dramatic Series	Jennifer Getzinger (for "A Little Kiss") (Note: Additional nominees: Michele Greco (unit production manager); Adam Ben Frank (first assistant director); Jessica Lowrey (second assistant director); Erik J. Carpenter (second second assistant director))	Nominated	
Directors Guild of America Awards	2016	Outstanding Directorial Achievement in Dramatic Series	Matthew Weiner (for "Person to Person") (Note: Additional nominees: Dara Weintraub (unit production manager); Lisa Rowe (first assistant director); Maria Mantia (second assistant director); M. Ryan Traylor (second second assistant director))	Nominated	
Dorian Awards	2010	TV Drama of the Year	Mad Men	Nominated	
Dorian Awards	2010	TV Performance of the Year: Drama	Jon Hamm	Nominated	
Dorian Awards	2011	TV Drama of the Year	Mad Men	Nominated	
Dorian Awards	2011	TV Drama Performance of the Year	Elisabeth Moss	Nominated	
Dorian Awards	2013	TV Drama of the Year	Mad Men	Nominated	
Dorian Awards	2013	TV Performance of the Year – Actor	Jon Hamm	Nominated	
Dorian Awards	2014	TV Drama of the Year	Mad Men	Nominated	
Dorian Awards	2014	TV Performance of the Year – Actor	Jon Hamm	Nominated	
Dorian Awards	2015	TV Drama of the Year	Mad Men	Nominated	
Dorian Awards	2016	TV Drama of the Year	Mad Men	Nominated	
Dorian Awards	2016	TV Performance of the Year – Actor	Jon Hamm	Nominated	
GLAAD Media Awards	2010	Outstanding Drama Series	Mad Men	Nominated	
Golden Globe Awards	2008	Best Television Series – Drama	Mad Men	Won	
Golden Globe Awards	2008	Best Performance by an Actor in a Television Series – Drama	Jon Hamm	Won	
Golden Globe Awards	2009	Best Television Series – Drama	Mad Men	Won	
Golden Globe Awards	2009	Best Performance by an Actor in a Television Series – Drama	Jon Hamm	Nominated	
Golden Globe Awards	2009	Best Performance by an Actress in a Television Series – Drama	January Jones	Nominated	
Golden Globe Awards	2010	Best Television Series – Drama	Mad Men	Won	
Golden Globe Awards	2010	Best Performance by an Actor in a Television Series – Drama	Jon Hamm	Nominated	
Golden Globe Awards	2010	Best Performance by an Actress in a Television Series – Drama	January Jones	Nominated	
Golden Globe Awards	2011	Best Television Series – Drama	Mad Men	Nominated	
Golden Globe Awards	2011	Best Performance by an Actor in a Television Series – Drama	Jon Hamm	Nominated	
Golden Globe Awards	2011	Best Performance by an Actress in a Television Series – Drama	Elisabeth Moss	Nominated	
Golden Globe Awards	2013	Best Performance by an Actor in a Television Series – Drama	Jon Hamm	Nominated	
Golden Globe Awards	2016	Best Performance by an Actor in a Television Series – Drama	Jon Hamm	Won	
Golden Reel Awards	2008	Best Sound Editing: Dialogue and ADR for Short Form Television	Jason George, Jed Dodge, Julie Altus, Dale Chaloukian, and Charles Kolander (for "Smoke Gets in Your Eyes")	Nominated	
Golden Reel Awards	2009	Best Sound Editing: Short Form Dialogue and ADR in Television	Jason George, Jed Dodge, Dale Chaloukian, and Julie Altus (for "The Jet Set") (Note: Additional crew: John Matter and David Padilla (assistant dialogue editors); Bob Deschaine (ADR mixer); Barbara Harris (loop group supervisor); Ken Teaney (dialogue re-recording mixer); Peter Bentley (production sound mixer); Tami Treadwell (ADR recordist))	Nominated	
Golden Reel Awards	2011	Best Sound Editing: Short Form Dialogue and ADR in Television	Jason George (for "The Summer Man") (Note: Additional crew: John Matter (assistant dialogue editor); John DeMita (loop group supervisor); Peter Bentley (production sound mixer); Ron Bedrosian (ADR mixer); Ken Teaney (dialogue re-recording mixer))	Nominated	
Golden Trailer Awards	2008	Best In-Theater Advertising	Happy Hour Creative and Trailer Park	Won	
Guild of Music Supervisors Awards	2011	Television	Alexandra Patsavas (Note: Shared with Gossip Girl, Chuck, Supernatural, FlashForward, and Grey's Anatomy)	Nominated	
Hollywood Music in Media Awards	2014	Outstanding Music Supervision – Television	Alexandra Patsavas	Nominated	
Hollywood Post Alliance Awards	2008	Outstanding Editing – Television	David J. Siegel (for "Indian Summer")	Nominated	
Hollywood Post Alliance Awards	2009	Outstanding Color Grading – Television	Tim Vincent (for "The Jet Set")	Nominated	
Hollywood Post Alliance Awards	2010	Outstanding Color Grading – Television	Tim Vincent (for "Souvenir")	Nominated	
Hollywood Post Alliance Awards	2011	Outstanding Color Grading – Television	Tim Vincent (for "Blowing Smoke")	Won	
Make-Up Artists and Hair Stylists Guild Awards	2015	Best Period and/or Character Hair Styling – Television and New Media Series	Theraesa Rivers and Arturo Rojas	Nominated	
Make-Up Artists and Hair Stylists Guild Awards	2015	Best Period and/or Character Make-Up – Television and New Media Series	Lana Horochowski and Ron Pipes	Nominated	
Peabody Awards	2008	Honoree	Mad Men (Note: Presented to AMC and Lionsgate Television)	Won	
Primetime Emmy Awards	2008	Outstanding Drama Series	Mad Men (Note: Nominees: Matthew Weiner (executive producer); Tom Palmer (co-executive producer); Scott Hornbacher, Lisa Albert, Andre Jacquemetton, and Maria Jacquemetton (producers))	Won	
Primetime Emmy Awards	2008	Outstanding Lead Actor in a Drama Series	Jon Hamm	Nominated	
Primetime Emmy Awards	2008	Outstanding Supporting Actor in a Drama Series	John Slattery	Nominated	
Primetime Emmy Awards	2008	Outstanding Writing for a Drama Series	Matthew Weiner (for "Smoke Gets in Your Eyes")	Won	
Primetime Emmy Awards	2008	Outstanding Writing for a Drama Series	Matthew Weiner and Robin Veith (for "The Wheel")	Nominated	
Primetime Emmy Awards	2008	Outstanding Directing for a Drama Series	Alan Taylor (for "Smoke Gets in Your Eyes")	Nominated	
Primetime Emmy Awards	2009	Outstanding Drama Series	Mad Men (Note: Nominees: Matthew Weiner (executive producer); Scott Hornbacher (co-executive producer); Andre Jacquemetton, Maria Jacquemetton, and Lisa Albert (supervising producers))	Won	
Primetime Emmy Awards	2009	Outstanding Lead Actor in a Drama Series	Jon Hamm	Nominated	
Primetime Emmy Awards	2009	Outstanding Lead Actress in a Drama Series	Elisabeth Moss	Nominated	
Primetime Emmy Awards	2009	Outstanding Supporting Actor in a Drama Series	John Slattery	Nominated	
Primetime Emmy Awards	2009	Outstanding Writing for a Drama Series	Kater Gordon and Matthew Weiner (for "Meditations in an Emergency")	Won	
Primetime Emmy Awards	2009	Outstanding Writing for a Drama Series	Andre Jacquemetton, Maria Jacquemetton, and Matthew Weiner (for "Six Month Leave")	Nominated	
Primetime Emmy Awards	2009	Outstanding Writing for a Drama Series	Robin Veith and Matthew Weiner (for "A Night to Remember")	Nominated	
Primetime Emmy Awards	2009	Outstanding Writing for a Drama Series	Matthew Weiner (for "The Jet Set")	Nominated	
Primetime Emmy Awards	2009	Outstanding Directing for a Drama Series	Phil Abraham (for "The Jet Set")	Nominated	
Primetime Emmy Awards	2010	Outstanding Drama Series	Mad Men (Note: Nominees: Matthew Weiner and Scott Hornbacher (executive producers); Lisa Albert (supervising producer); Blake McCormick and Dwayne Shattuck (producers))	Won	
Primetime Emmy Awards	2010	Outstanding Lead Actor in a Drama Series	Jon Hamm	Nominated	
Primetime Emmy Awards	2010	Outstanding Lead Actress in a Drama Series	January Jones	Nominated	
Primetime Emmy Awards	2010	Outstanding Supporting Actor in a Drama Series	John Slattery	Nominated	
Primetime Emmy Awards	2010	Outstanding Supporting Actress in a Drama Series	Christina Hendricks	Nominated	
Primetime Emmy Awards	2010	Outstanding Supporting Actress in a Drama Series	Elisabeth Moss	Nominated	
Primetime Emmy Awards	2010	Outstanding Writing for a Drama Series	Robin Veith and Matthew Weiner (for "Guy Walks Into an Advertising Agency")	Nominated	
Primetime Emmy Awards	2010	Outstanding Writing for a Drama Series	Matthew Weiner and Erin Levy (for "Shut the Door. Have a Seat.")	Won	
Primetime Emmy Awards	2010	Outstanding Directing for a Drama Series	Lesli Linka Glatter (for "Guy Walks Into an Advertising Agency")	Nominated	
Primetime Emmy Awards	2011	Outstanding Drama Series	Mad Men (Note: Nominees: Matthew Weiner and Scott Hornbacher (executive producers); Andre Jacquemetton and Maria Jacquemetton (co-executive producers); Dahvi Waller, Jonathan Abrahams, Dwayne Shattuck, and Blake McCormick (producers))	Won	
Primetime Emmy Awards	2011	Outstanding Lead Actor in a Drama Series	Jon Hamm	Nominated	
Primetime Emmy Awards	2011	Outstanding Lead Actress in a Drama Series	Elisabeth Moss	Nominated	
Primetime Emmy Awards	2011	Outstanding Supporting Actor in a Drama Series	John Slattery	Nominated	
Primetime Emmy Awards	2011	Outstanding Supporting Actress in a Drama Series	Christina Hendricks	Nominated	
Primetime Emmy Awards	2011	Outstanding Writing for a Drama Series	Andre Jacquemetton and Maria Jacquemetton (for "Blowing Smoke")	Nominated	
Primetime Emmy Awards	2011	Outstanding Writing for a Drama Series	Matthew Weiner (for "The Suitcase")	Nominated	
Primetime Emmy Awards	2012	Outstanding Drama Series	Mad Men (Note: Nominees: Matthew Weiner, Scott Hornbacher, Andre Jacquemetton, and Maria Jacquemetton (executive producers); Victor Levin (co-executive producer); Jon Hamm and Blake McCormick (producers))	Nominated	
Primetime Emmy Awards	2012	Outstanding Lead Actor in a Drama Series	Jon Hamm	Nominated	
Primetime Emmy Awards	2012	Outstanding Lead Actress in a Drama Series	Elisabeth Moss	Nominated	
Primetime Emmy Awards	2012	Outstanding Supporting Actor in a Drama Series	Jared Harris	Nominated	
Primetime Emmy Awards	2012	Outstanding Supporting Actress in a Drama Series	Christina Hendricks	Nominated	
Primetime Emmy Awards	2012	Outstanding Writing for a Drama Series	Semi Chellas and Matthew Weiner (for "The Other Woman")	Nominated	
Primetime Emmy Awards	2012	Outstanding Writing for a Drama Series	Andre Jacquemetton and Maria Jacquemetton (for "Commissions and Fees")	Nominated	
Primetime Emmy Awards	2012	Outstanding Writing for a Drama Series	Matthew Weiner and Semi Chellas (for "Far Away Places")	Nominated	
Primetime Emmy Awards	2012	Outstanding Directing for a Drama Series	Phil Abraham (for "The Other Woman")	Nominated	
Primetime Emmy Awards	2013	Outstanding Drama Series	Mad Men (Note: Nominees: Matthew Weiner, Scott Hornbacher, Andre Jacquemetton, Maria Jacquemetton, and Janet Leahy (executive producers); Semi Chellas (supervising producer); Jon Hamm, Blake McCormick, and Erin Levy (producers))	Nominated	
Primetime Emmy Awards	2013	Outstanding Lead Actor in a Drama Series	Jon Hamm	Nominated	
Primetime Emmy Awards	2013	Outstanding Lead Actress in a Drama Series	Elisabeth Moss	Nominated	
Primetime Emmy Awards	2013	Outstanding Supporting Actress in a Drama Series	Christina Hendricks	Nominated	
Primetime Emmy Awards	2014	Outstanding Drama Series	Mad Men (Note: Nominees: Matthew Weiner, Scott Hornbacher, and Janet Leahy (executive producers); Semi Chellas (co-executive producer); Erin Levy (supervising producer); Jon Hamm, Blake McCormick, and Tom Smuts (producers))	Nominated	
Primetime Emmy Awards	2014	Outstanding Lead Actor in a Drama Series	Jon Hamm	Nominated	
Primetime Emmy Awards	2014	Outstanding Supporting Actress in a Drama Series	Christina Hendricks	Nominated	
Primetime Emmy Awards	2015	Outstanding Drama Series	Mad Men (Note: Nominees: Matthew Weiner, Scott Hornbacher, and Janet Leahy (executive producers); Semi Chellas (co-executive producer); Erin Levy (supervising producer); Jon Hamm, Blake McCormick, and Tom Smuts (producers))	Nominated	
Primetime Emmy Awards	2015	Outstanding Lead Actor in a Drama Series	Jon Hamm	Won	
Primetime Emmy Awards	2015	Outstanding Lead Actress in a Drama Series	Elisabeth Moss	Nominated	
Primetime Emmy Awards	2015	Outstanding Supporting Actress in a Drama Series	Christina Hendricks	Nominated	
Primetime Emmy Awards	2015	Outstanding Writing for a Drama Series	Semi Chellas and Matthew Weiner (for "Lost Horizon")	Nominated	
Primetime Emmy Awards	2015	Outstanding Writing for a Drama Series	Matthew Weiner (for "Person to Person")	Nominated	
Primetime Creative Arts Emmy Awards	2008	Outstanding Art Direction for a Single-Camera Series	Dan Bishop, Christopher L. Brown, and Amy Wells (for "Shoot")	Nominated	
Primetime Creative Arts Emmy Awards	2008	Outstanding Art Direction for a Single-Camera Series	Bob Shaw, Henry Dunn, and Rena DeAngelo (for "Smoke Gets in Your Eyes"	Won	
Primetime Creative Arts Emmy Awards	2008	Outstanding Casting for a Drama Series	Kim Miscia, Beth Bowling, Laura Schiff, and Carrie Audino	Nominated	
Primetime Creative Arts Emmy Awards	2008	Outstanding Cinematography for a One-Hour Series	Phil Abraham (for "Smoke Gets in Your Eyes")	Won	
Primetime Creative Arts Emmy Awards	2008	Outstanding Costumes for a Series	John A. Dunn and Lisa Padovani (for "Smoke Gets in Your Eyes")	Nominated	
Primetime Creative Arts Emmy Awards	2008	Outstanding Guest Actor in a Drama Series	Robert Morse	Nominated	
Primetime Creative Arts Emmy Awards	2008	Outstanding Hairstyling for a Single-Camera Series	Gloria Pasqua Casny, Lucia Mace, Anthony Wilson, and Barbara Cantu (for "Shoot")	Won	
Primetime Creative Arts Emmy Awards	2008	Outstanding Main Title Design	Mark Gardner, Steve Fuller, and Cara McKenney	Won	
Primetime Creative Arts Emmy Awards	2008	Outstanding Makeup for a Single-Camera Series (Non-Prosthetic)	Debbie Zoller, Ron Pipes, and Suzanne Diaz (for "The Hobo Code")	Nominated	
Primetime Creative Arts Emmy Awards	2008	Outstanding Prosthetic Makeup for a Series, Miniseries, Movie or Special	Debbie Zoller, Joel Harlow, Brian Penikas, and Jake Garber (for "Nixon vs. Kennedy")	Nominated	
Primetime Creative Arts Emmy Awards	2009	Outstanding Art Direction for a Single-Camera Series	Dan Bishop, Christopher L. Brown, and Amy Wells (for "The Jet Set")	Nominated	
Primetime Creative Arts Emmy Awards	2009	Outstanding Casting for a Drama Series	Laura Schiff and Carrie Audino	Nominated	
Primetime Creative Arts Emmy Awards	2009	Outstanding Cinematography for a One-Hour Series	Christopher Manley (for "The New Girl")	Nominated	
Primetime Creative Arts Emmy Awards	2009	Outstanding Costumes for a Series	Janie Bryant and Le Dawson (for "Meditations in an Emergency")	Nominated	
Primetime Creative Arts Emmy Awards	2009	Outstanding Hairstyling for a Single-Camera Series	Gloria Ponce, Katherine Rees, Marilyn Phillips, and Michele Payne (for "The Gold Violin")	Won	
Primetime Creative Arts Emmy Awards	2009	Outstanding Makeup for a Single-Camera Series (Non-Prosthetic)	Debbie Zoller, Denise DellaValle, Ron Pipes, and Debra Schrey (for "The Jet Set")	Nominated	
Primetime Creative Arts Emmy Awards	2009	Outstanding Single-Camera Picture Editing for a Drama Series	Cindy Mollo (for "Maidenform")	Nominated	
Primetime Creative Arts Emmy Awards	2010	Outstanding Casting for a Drama Series	Laura Schiff and Carrie Audino	Won	
Primetime Creative Arts Emmy Awards	2010	Outstanding Cinematography for a One-Hour Series	Christopher Manley (for "Shut the Door. Have a Seat.")	Nominated	
Primetime Creative Arts Emmy Awards	2010	Outstanding Costumes for a Series	Janie Bryant and Le Dawson (for "Souvenir")	Nominated	
Primetime Creative Arts Emmy Awards	2010	Outstanding Guest Actor in a Drama Series	Robert Morse (for "Shut the Door. Have a Seat.")	Nominated	
Primetime Creative Arts Emmy Awards	2010	Outstanding Hairstyling for a Single-Camera Series	Lucia Mace, Anthony Wilson, Mary Guerrero, and Peggy Semtob (for "Souvenir")	Won	
Primetime Creative Arts Emmy Awards	2010	Outstanding Makeup for a Single-Camera Series (Non-Prosthetic)	Lana Horochowski, Ron Pipes, Maggie Fung, Kate Shorter, Bonita Dehaven, and Angie Wells (for "Souvenir")	Nominated	
Primetime Creative Arts Emmy Awards	2010	Outstanding Single-Camera Picture Editing for a Drama Series	Pattye Rogers and Christopher Nelson (for "The Gypsy and the Hobo")	Nominated	
Primetime Creative Arts Emmy Awards	2010	Outstanding Single-Camera Picture Editing for a Drama Series	Tom Wilson (for "Guy Walks Into an Advertising Agency")	Nominated	
Primetime Creative Arts Emmy Awards	2011	Outstanding Art Direction for a Single-Camera Series	Dan Bishop, Christopher L. Brown, and Claudette Didul (for "Public Relations")	Nominated	
Primetime Creative Arts Emmy Awards	2011	Outstanding Casting for a Drama Series	Laura Schiff and Carrie Audino	Nominated	
Primetime Creative Arts Emmy Awards	2011	Outstanding Costumes for a Series	Janie Bryant and Le Dawson (for "The Beautiful Girls")	Nominated	
Primetime Creative Arts Emmy Awards	2011	Outstanding Guest Actor in a Drama Series	Robert Morse	Nominated	
Primetime Creative Arts Emmy Awards	2011	Outstanding Guest Actress in a Drama Series	Cara Buono	Nominated	
Primetime Creative Arts Emmy Awards	2011	Outstanding Guest Actress in a Drama Series	Randee Heller	Nominated	
Primetime Creative Arts Emmy Awards	2011	Outstanding Hairstyling for a Single-Camera Series	Lucia Mace, Theraesa Rivers, and Terrie Owen (for "Hands and Knees")	Nominated	
Primetime Creative Arts Emmy Awards	2011	Outstanding Hairstyling for a Single-Camera Series	Sean Flanigan, Gloria Casny, Lucia Mace, Theraesa Rivers, and Jules Holdren (for "Christmas Comes But Once a Year")	Won	
Primetime Creative Arts Emmy Awards	2011	Outstanding Makeup for a Single-Camera Series (Non-Prosthetic)	Lana Horochowski, Ron Pipes, Maurine Schlenz Burke, Mary Kay Witt, and Tricia Sawyer (for "The Rejected")	Nominated	
Primetime Creative Arts Emmy Awards	2011	Outstanding Single-Camera Picture Editing for a Drama Series	Pattye Rogers and Leo Trombetta (for "Blowing Smoke")	Nominated	
Primetime Creative Arts Emmy Awards	2011	Outstanding Single-Camera Picture Editing for a Drama Series	Tom Wilson (for "The Suitcase")	Nominated	
Primetime Creative Arts Emmy Awards	2011	Outstanding Sound Mixing for a Comedy or Drama Series (One Hour)	Peter Bentley, Ken Teaney, and Todd Orr (for "The Suitcase")	Nominated	
Primetime Creative Arts Emmy Awards	2012	Outstanding Art Direction for a Single-Camera Series	Dan Bishop, Christopher L. Brown, and Claudette Didul (for "At the Codfish Ball")	Nominated	
Primetime Creative Arts Emmy Awards	2012	Outstanding Casting for a Drama Series	Laura Schiff and Carrie Audino	Nominated	
Primetime Creative Arts Emmy Awards	2012	Outstanding Cinematography for a Single-Camera Series	Christopher Manley (for "The Phantom")	Nominated	
Primetime Creative Arts Emmy Awards	2012	Outstanding Guest Actor in a Drama Series	Ben Feldman	Nominated	
Primetime Creative Arts Emmy Awards	2012	Outstanding Guest Actress in a Drama Series	Julia Ormond	Nominated	
Primetime Creative Arts Emmy Awards	2012	Outstanding Hairstyling for a Single-Camera Series	Theraesa Rivers, Lucia Mace, Arturo Rojas, Maria Sandoval, and David Blair (for "The Phantom")	Nominated	
Primetime Creative Arts Emmy Awards	2012	Outstanding Makeup for a Single-Camera Series (Non-Prosthetic)	Lana Horochowski, Ron Pipes, Ken Niederbaumer, and Keith Sayer (for "Christmas Waltz")	Nominated	
Primetime Creative Arts Emmy Awards	2012	Outstanding Single-Camera Picture Editing for a Drama Series	Christopher Gay (for "Far Away Places")	Nominated	
Primetime Creative Arts Emmy Awards	2013	Outstanding Cinematography for a Single-Camera Series	Christopher Manley (for "The Doorway")	Nominated	
Primetime Creative Arts Emmy Awards	2013	Outstanding Guest Actor in a Drama Series	Harry Hamlin	Nominated	
Primetime Creative Arts Emmy Awards	2013	Outstanding Guest Actor in a Drama Series	Robert Morse	Nominated	
Primetime Creative Arts Emmy Awards	2013	Outstanding Guest Actress in a Drama Series	Linda Cardellini	Nominated	
Primetime Creative Arts Emmy Awards	2013	Outstanding Hairstyling for a Single-Camera Series	Theraesa Rivers, Arturo Rojas, David Blair, and Jules Holdren (for "The Doorway")	Nominated	
Primetime Creative Arts Emmy Awards	2013	Outstanding Makeup for a Single-Camera Series (Non-Prosthetic)	Lana Horochowski, Ron Pipes, Ken Niederbaumer, Maurine Burke, and Cyndilee Rice (for "The Doorway")	Nominated	
Primetime Creative Arts Emmy Awards	2013	Outstanding Single-Camera Picture Editing for a Drama Series	Chris Figler (for "Collaborators")	Nominated	
Primetime Creative Arts Emmy Awards	2013	Outstanding Sound Mixing for a Comedy or Drama Series (One Hour)	Peter Bentley, Ken Teaney, and Alec St. John (for "The Flood")	Nominated	
Primetime Creative Arts Emmy Awards	2014	Outstanding Art Direction for a Period Series, Miniseries or a Movie	Dan Bishop, Shanna Starzyk, and Claudette Didul (for "Time Zones")	Nominated	
Primetime Creative Arts Emmy Awards	2014	Outstanding Costumes for a Series	Janie Bryant, Tiffany White Stanton, and Stacy Horn (for "Time Zones")	Nominated	
Primetime Creative Arts Emmy Awards	2014	Outstanding Guest Actor in a Drama Series	Robert Morse	Nominated	
Primetime Creative Arts Emmy Awards	2014	Outstanding Hairstyling for a Single-Camera Series	Theraesa Rivers, Arturo Rojas, Valerie Jackson, and Ai Nakata (for "The Runaways")	Nominated	
Primetime Creative Arts Emmy Awards	2014	Outstanding Makeup for a Single-Camera Series (Non-Prosthetic)	Lana Horochowski, Ron Pipes, Ken Niederbaumer, Maurine Burke, and Jennifer Greenberg (for "The Runaways")	Nominated	
Primetime Creative Arts Emmy Awards	2015	Outstanding Casting for a Drama Series	Laura Schiff and Carrie Audino	Nominated	
Primetime Creative Arts Emmy Awards	2015	Outstanding Hairstyling for a Single-Camera Series	Theraesa Rivers, Arturo Rojas, Valerie Jackson, and Ai Nakata (for "Person to Person")	Nominated	
Primetime Creative Arts Emmy Awards	2015	Outstanding Makeup for a Single-Camera Series (Non-Prosthetic)	Lana Horochowski, Ron Pipes, Maurine Burke, and Jennifer Greenberg (for "Person to Person")	Nominated	
Primetime Creative Arts Emmy Awards	2015	Outstanding Production Design for a Narrative Period Program (One Hour or More)	Dan Bishop, Shanna Starzyk, and Claudette Didul (for "Person to Person")	Nominated	
Primetime Creative Arts Emmy Awards	2015	Outstanding Single-Camera Picture Editing for a Drama Series	Tom Wilson (for "Person to Person")	Nominated	
Producers Guild of America Awards	2009	Norman Felton Producer of the Year Award in Episodic Television – Drama	Mad Men (Note: Nominees: Matthew Weiner and Scott Hornbacher)	Won	
Producers Guild of America Awards	2010	Norman Felton Producer of the Year Award in Episodic Television – Drama	Mad Men (Note: Nominees: Matthew Weiner, Scott Hornbacher, Lisa Albert, Andre Jacquemetton, and Maria Jacquemetton)	Won	
Producers Guild of America Awards	2011	Norman Felton Award for Outstanding Producer of Episodic Television, Drama	Mad Men (Note: Nominees: Lisa Albert, Scott Hornbacher, Andre Jacquemetton, Maria Jacquemetton, Blake McCormick, Dwayne Shattuck, and Matthew Weiner)	Won	
Producers Guild of America Awards	2012	Norman Felton Award for Outstanding Producer of Episodic Television, Drama	Mad Men (Note: Nominees: Jonathan Abrahams, Scott Hornbacher, Andre Jacquemetton, Maria Jacquemetton, Blake McCormick, Dwayne Shattuck, Dahvi Waller, and Matthew Weiner)	Nominated	
Producers Guild of America Awards	2013	Norman Felton Award for Outstanding Producer of Episodic Television, Drama	Mad Men (Note: Nominees: Jon Hamm, Scott Hornbacher, Andre Jacquemetton, Maria Jacquemetton, Victor Levin, Blake McCormick, and Matthew Weiner)	Nominated	
Producers Guild of America Awards	2016	Norman Felton Award for Outstanding Producer of Episodic Television, Drama	Mad Men (Note: Nominees: Matthew Weiner, Scott Hornbacher, Janet Leahy, Semi Chellas, Erin Levy, Jon Hamm, Blake McCormick, and Tom Smuts)	Nominated	
Royal Television Society Awards	2009	International Award	Mad Men	Won	
Satellite Awards	2007	Best Television Series, Drama	Mad Men	Nominated	
Satellite Awards	2007	Best Ensemble, Television	Mad Men	Won	
Satellite Awards	2008	Best Television Series, Drama	Mad Men	Nominated	
Satellite Awards	2008	Best Actor in a Series, Drama	Jon Hamm	Nominated	
Satellite Awards	2008	Best Actor in a Supporting Role in a Series, Miniseries or Motion Picture Made for Television	John Slattery	Nominated	
Satellite Awards	2009	Best Television Series, Drama	Mad Men	Nominated	
Satellite Awards	2009	Best Actor in a Series, Drama	Jon Hamm	Nominated	
Satellite Awards	2009	Best Actress in a Series, Drama	Elisabeth Moss	Nominated	
Satellite Awards	2010	Best Television Series, Drama	Mad Men	Nominated	
Satellite Awards	2010	Best Actor in a Series, Drama	Jon Hamm	Nominated	
Satellite Awards	2010	Best Actress in a Series, Drama	January Jones	Nominated	
Satellite Awards	2010	Best Actress in a Supporting Role in a Series, Miniseries or Motion Picture Made for Television	Elisabeth Moss	Nominated	
Satellite Awards	2012	Best Actor in a Series, Drama	Jon Hamm	Nominated	
Satellite Awards	2012	Best Actress in a Supporting Role in a Series, Miniseries or Motion Picture Made for Television	Christina Hendricks	Nominated	
Satellite Awards	2014	Best Television Series, Drama	Mad Men	Nominated	
Satellite Awards	2014	Best Actor in a Series, Drama	Jon Hamm	Nominated	
Satellite Awards	2014	Best Actor in a Supporting Role in a Series, Miniseries or Motion Picture Made for Television	James Wolk	Nominated	
Screen Actors Guild Awards	2008	Outstanding Performance by an Ensemble in a Drama Series	Mad Men (Note: Nominees: Bryan Batt, Anne Dudek, Michael Gladis, Jon Hamm, Christina Hendricks, January Jones, Vincent Kartheiser, Robert Morse, Elisabeth Moss, Maggie Siff, John Slattery, Rich Sommer, and Aaron Staton)	Nominated	
Screen Actors Guild Awards	2008	Outstanding Performance by a Male Actor in a Drama Series	Jon Hamm	Nominated	
Screen Actors Guild Awards	2009	Outstanding Performance by an Ensemble in a Drama Series	Mad Men (Note: Nominees: Bryan Batt, Alison Brie, Michael Gladis, Jon Hamm, Aaron Hart, Christina Hendricks, January Jones, Vincent Kartheiser, Robert Morse, Mark Moses, Elisabeth Moss, Kiernan Shipka, John Slattery, Rich Sommer, and Aaron Staton)	Won	
Screen Actors Guild Awards	2009	Outstanding Performance by a Male Actor in a Drama Series	Jon Hamm	Nominated	
Screen Actors Guild Awards	2009	Outstanding Performance by a Female Actor in a Drama Series	Elisabeth Moss	Nominated	
Screen Actors Guild Awards	2010	Outstanding Performance by an Ensemble in a Drama Series	Mad Men (Note: Nominees: Alexa Alemanni, Bryan Batt, Jared S. Gilmore, Michael Gladis, Jon Hamm, Jared Harris, Christina Hendricks, January Jones, Vincent Kartheiser, Robert Morse, Elisabeth Moss, Kiernan Shipka, John Slattery, Rich Sommer, Christopher Stanley, and Aaron Staton)	Won	
Screen Actors Guild Awards	2010	Outstanding Performance by a Male Actor in a Drama Series	Jon Hamm	Nominated	
Screen Actors Guild Awards	2011	Outstanding Performance by an Ensemble in a Drama Series	Mad Men (Note: Nominees: Cara Buono, Jon Hamm, Jared Harris, Christina Hendricks, January Jones, Vincent Kartheiser, Matt Long, Robert Morse, Elisabeth Moss, Jessica Paré, Kiernan Shipka, John Slattery, Rich Sommer, Christopher Stanley, and Aaron Staton)	Nominated	
Screen Actors Guild Awards	2011	Outstanding Performance by a Male Actor in a Drama Series	Jon Hamm	Nominated	
Screen Actors Guild Awards	2011	Outstanding Performance by a Female Actor in a Drama Series	Elisabeth Moss	Nominated	
Screen Actors Guild Awards	2013	Outstanding Performance by an Ensemble in a Drama Series	Mad Men (Note: Nominees: Ben Feldman, Jay R. Ferguson, Jon Hamm, Jared Harris, Christina Hendricks, Vincent Kartheiser, Robert Morse, Elisabeth Moss, Jessica Paré, Teyonah Parris, Kiernan Shipka, John Slattery, Rich Sommer, and Aaron Staton)	Nominated	
Screen Actors Guild Awards	2013	Outstanding Performance by a Male Actor in a Drama Series	Jon Hamm	Nominated	
Screen Actors Guild Awards	2016	Outstanding Performance by an Ensemble in a Drama Series	Mad Men (Note: Nominees: Sola Bamis, Stephanie Drake, Jay R. Ferguson, Bruce Greenwood, Jon Hamm, Christina Hendricks, January Jones, Vincent Kartheiser, Elisabeth Moss, Kevin Rahm, Kiernan Shipka, John Slattery, Rich Sommer, Aaron Staton, and Mason Vale Cotton)	Nominated	
Screen Actors Guild Awards	2016	Outstanding Performance by a Male Actor in a Drama Series	Jon Hamm	Nominated	
Society of Camera Operators Awards	2014	Camera Operator of the Year – Television	Don Devine	Won	
Television Critics Association Awards	2008	Program of the Year	Mad Men	Won	
Television Critics Association Awards	2008	Outstanding New Program	Mad Men	Won	
Television Critics Association Awards	2008	Outstanding Achievement in Drama	Mad Men	Won	
Television Critics Association Awards	2008	Individual Achievement in Drama	Jon Hamm	Nominated	
Television Critics Association Awards	2009	Program of the Year	Mad Men	Nominated	
Television Critics Association Awards	2009	Outstanding Achievement in Drama	Mad Men	Won	
Television Critics Association Awards	2009	Individual Achievement in Drama	Jon Hamm	Nominated	
Television Critics Association Awards	2010	Outstanding Achievement in Drama	Mad Men	Nominated	
Television Critics Association Awards	2011	Outstanding Achievement in Drama	Mad Men	Won	
Television Critics Association Awards	2011	Individual Achievement in Drama	Jon Hamm	Won	
Television Critics Association Awards	2012	Program of the Year	Mad Men	Nominated	
Television Critics Association Awards	2012	Outstanding Achievement in Drama	Mad Men	Nominated	
Television Critics Association Awards	2012	Individual Achievement in Drama	Jon Hamm	Nominated	
Television Critics Association Awards	2013	Outstanding Achievement in Drama	Mad Men	Nominated	
Television Critics Association Awards	2015	Program of the Year	Mad Men	Nominated	
Television Critics Association Awards	2015	Outstanding Achievement in Drama	Mad Men	Nominated	
Television Critics Association Awards	2015	Individual Achievement in Drama	Jon Hamm	Won	
Women's Image Network Awards	2013	Outstanding Drama Series	Mad Men	Won	
Writers Guild of America Awards	2008	Television: Dramatic Series	Mad Men (Note: Nominees: Lisa Albert, Bridget Bedard, Andre Jacquemetton, Maria Jacquemetton, Tom Palmer, Chris Provenzano, Robin Veith, and Matthew Weiner)	Nominated	
Writers Guild of America Awards	2008	Television: New Series	Mad Men (Note: Nominees: Lisa Albert, Bridget Bedard, Andre Jacquemetton, Maria Jacquemetton, Tom Palmer, Chris Provenzano, Robin Veith, and Matthew Weiner)	Won	
Writers Guild of America Awards	2008	Television: Episodic Drama	Chris Provenzano (for "The Hobo Code")	Nominated	
Writers Guild of America Awards	2009	Television: Dramatic Series	Mad Men (Note: Nominees: Lisa Albert, Jane Anderson, Rick Cleveland, Kater Gordon, David Isaacs, Andre Jacquemetton, Maria Jacquemetton, Marti Noxon, Robin Veith, and Matthew Weiner)	Won	
Writers Guild of America Awards	2010	Television: Dramatic Series	Mad Men (Note: Nominees: Lisa Albert, Andrew Colville, Kater Gordon, Cathryn Humphris, Andre Jacquemetton, Maria Jacquemetton, Brett Johnson, Erin Levy, Marti Noxon, Frank Pierson, Robin Veith, Dahvi Waller, and Matthew Weiner)	Won	
Writers Guild of America Awards	2010	Television: Episodic Drama	Brett Johnson and Matthew Weiner (for "The Grown-Ups")	Nominated	
Writers Guild of America Awards	2010	Television: Episodic Drama	Robin Veith and Matthew Weiner (for "Guy Walks Into an Advertising Agency")	Nominated	
Writers Guild of America Awards	2011	Television: Dramatic Series	Mad Men (Note: Nominees: Jonathan Abrahams, Lisa Albert, Keith Huff, Jonathan Igla, Andre Jacquemetton, Maria Jacquemetton, Brett Johnson, Janet Leahy, Erin Levy, Tracy McMillan, Dahvi Waller, and Matthew Weiner)	Won	
Writers Guild of America Awards	2011	Television: Episodic Drama	Erin Levy (for "The Chrysanthemum and the Sword")	Won	
Writers Guild of America Awards	2013	Television: Dramatic Series	Mad Men (Note: Nominees: Lisa Albert, Semi Chellas, Jason Grote, Jonathan Igla, Andre Jacquemetton, Maria Jacquemetton, Brett Johnson, Janet Leahy, Victor Levin, Erin Levy, Frank Pierson, Michael Saltzman, Tom Smuts, and Matthew Weiner)	Nominated	
Writers Guild of America Awards	2013	Television: Episodic Drama	Semi Chellas and Matthew Weiner (for "The Other Woman")	Won	
Writers Guild of America Awards	2014	Television: Dramatic Series	Mad Men (Note: Nominees: Lisa Albert, Semi Chellas, Jason Grote, Jonathan Igla, Andre Jacquemetton, Maria Jacquemetton, Janet Leahy, Erin Levy, Michael Saltzman, Tom Smuts, Matthew Weiner, and Carly Wray)	Nominated	
Writers Guild of America Awards	2015	Television: Dramatic Series	Mad Men (Note: Nominees: Lisa Albert, Heather Jeng Bladt, Semi Chellas, Jonathan Igla, David Iserson, Janet Leahy, Erin Levy, Patricia Resnick, Tom Smuts, Matthew Weiner, and Carly Wray)	Nominated	
Writers Guild of America Awards	2015	Television: Episodic Drama	Jonathan Igla and Matthew Weiner (for "A Day's Work")	Nominated	
Writers Guild of America Awards	2016	Television: Dramatic Series	Mad Men (Note: Nominees: Lisa Albert, Semi Chellas, Jonathan Igla, Janet Leahy, Erin Levy, Tom Smuts, Robert Towne, Matthew Weiner, and Carly Wray)	Won	
Writers Guild of America Awards	2016	Television: Episodic Drama	Matthew Weiner (for "Person to Person")	Nominated	
Young Artist Awards	2009	Best Performance in a TV Series – Recurring Young Actor	Aaron Hart	Nominated	
Young Artist Awards	2009	Best Performance in a TV Series – Recurring Young Actress	Kiernan Shipka	Nominated	
Young Artist Awards	2010	Best Performance in a TV Series – Guest Starring Young Actress	Erin Sanders	Nominated	
Young Artist Awards	2011	Best Performance in a TV Series (Comedy or Drama) – Supporting Young Actress	Kiernan Shipka	Nominated	
Young Artist Awards	2013	Best Performance in a TV Series – Recurring Young Actor	Martin Holden Weiner	Won	
Young Artist Awards	2013	Best Performance in a TV Series – Recurring Young Actress	Kiernan Shipka	Won (Note: Tied with Addison Holley for My Babysitter's a Vampire)	
Young Artist Awards	2014	Best Performance in a TV Series – Guest Starring Young Actress 11–13	Cameron Protzman	Nominated	
