= Mad Men season 6 =

Season of television series

Mad Men
- Season 6
- Season 6 promotional poster by Brian Sanders
- Starring: Jon Hamm; Elisabeth Moss; Vincent Kartheiser; January Jones; Christina Hendricks; Aaron Staton; Rich Sommer; Kiernan Shipka; Jessica Paré; Kevin Rahm; Christopher Stanley; Jay R. Ferguson; Ben Feldman; Mason Vale Cotton; Robert Morse; John Slattery
- No. of episodes: 13

Release
- Original network: AMC
- Original release: April 7 – June 23, 2013

Season chronology
- ← Previous; Season 5 Next → Season 7

The sixth season of the American television drama series Mad Men premiered on April 7, 2013, with a two-hour episode and concluded on June 23, 2013. It consisted of thirteen episodes, each running for approximately 48 minutes. AMC broadcast the sixth season on Sundays at 10:00 pm (ET) in the United States. The season premiered in the UK on Sky Atlantic on April 10, 2013. The sixth season was released on DVD and Blu-ray in region 1 on November 5, 2013. Season six takes place between December 1967 and November 1968, with characters struggling to adjust to the changing office dynamics based on the counterculture movement. The sixth season of Mad Men received critical acclaim and appeared on several year-end lists, placing fourth for most overall mentions by critics.

== Cast ==
=== Main cast ===
- Jon Hamm as Don Draper
- Elisabeth Moss as Peggy Olson
- Vincent Kartheiser as Pete Campbell
- January Jones as Betty Francis
- Christina Hendricks as Joan Harris
- Aaron Staton as Ken Cosgrove
- Rich Sommer as Harry Crane
- Kiernan Shipka as Sally Draper
- Jessica Paré as Megan Draper
- Kevin Rahm as Ted Chaough
- Christopher Stanley as Henry Francis
- Jay R. Ferguson as Stan Rizzo
- Ben Feldman as Michael Ginsberg
- Mason Vale Cotton as Bobby Draper
- Robert Morse as Bert Cooper
- John Slattery as Roger Sterling

=== Recurring cast ===
- James Wolk as Bob Benson
- Linda Cardellini as Sylvia Rosen
- Harry Hamlin as Jim Cutler
- Teyonah Parris as Dawn Chambers
- Christine Garver as Moira
- Brian Markinson as Dr. Arnold Rosen
- Stephanie Drake as Meredith
- Trevor Einhorn as John Mathis
- Charlie Hofheimer as Abe Drexler
- Alison Brie as Trudy Campbell
- Beth Hall as Caroline
- Kit Williamson as Ed
- Ray Abruzzo as Jonesy
- Channing Chase as Dorothy "Dot" Campbell
- Brandon Killham as Young Dick Whitman
- Mark Moses as Herman "Duck" Phillips
- Timi Prulhiere as Nan Chaough
- Elizabeth Rice as Margaret Hargrove
- Morgan Rusler as Mack Johnson
- Craig Anton as Frank Gleason
- Gary Basaraba as Herb Rennet
- Christine Estabrook as Gail Holloway
- Megan Ferguson as Aimee Swenson
- Michael Gaston as Burt Peterson
- Joanna Going as Arlene
- Allan Havey as Lou Avery
- Brynn Horrocks as Abigail Whitman
- Rich Hutchman as Bud Campbell
- Patrick Mapel as Dinkins
- Derek Ray as Brooks Hargrove

=== Guest stars ===
- Talia Balsam as Mona Sterling
- Pamela Dunlap as Pauline Francis
- Peyton List as Jane Sterling
- Joe O'Connor as Tom Vogel
- Julia Ormond as Marie Calvet
- Danny Strong as Danny Siegel
- Marten Holden Weiner as Glen Bishop
- Ray Wise as Ed Baxter

== Episodes ==
No. overall	No. in season	Title	Directed by	Written by	Original release date	US viewers (millions)
66	1	"The Doorway"	Scott Hornbacher	Matthew Weiner	April 7, 2013	3.37
67	2	"The Doorway"	Scott Hornbacher	Matthew Weiner	April 7, 2013	3.37
A flashback depicts Don's doorman collapsing from a heart attack, and being revived by Don's neighbor Arnold Rosen. In the present, Don and Megan take a vacation to Hawaii for a new client, Sheraton Hotels, and Don chats with Private Dinkins, a soldier on R&R from a tour in Vietnam. Returning to Manhattan, Don drinks heavily upon discovering that he has accidentally picked up Dinkins' Army lighter instead of his own. Roger speaks to his psychiatrist about aging, and he later receives news of his mother's death. At the funeral, Margaret attempts to cajole Roger into investing in her husband's refrigeration business idea. Ken becomes suspicious of the intentions of Bob Benson, an eager-to-please junior accounts man. Peggy is thriving at her new job at CGC, and saves a Super Bowl ad from being pulled. Betty bonds with Sally's violinist friend Sandy, who expresses a desire to move to Manhattan. When Sandy abruptly leaves, Betty travels to Greenwich Village to find her, only to discover from the Village squatters that Sandy has left for California. Don and Megan celebrate New Years Eve with the Rosens, and Don is revealed to be having an affair with Arnold's wife Sylvia.
68	3	"Collaborators"	Jon Hamm	Jonathan Igla and Matthew Weiner	April 14, 2013	2.66
Pete and Trudy host a dinner party for their neighbors in Cos Cob. Pete flirts with his neighbor's wife, Brenda, and they meet for a tryst in his Manhattan apartment. Trudy realizes the affair when Brenda returns to the Campbell home, having been beaten by her husband; Trudy lambasts Pete for being indiscreet and kicks him out of their home. Meanwhile, Megan confides to Sylvia about her recent miscarriage and admits it to Don, prompting an awkward conversation about whether they want to have children. Raymond, representing Heinz Baked Beans, brings a Heinz Ketchup representative in for a meeting with SCDP, but makes it clear that he does not want SCDP to work with Heinz Ketchup. Nevertheless, SCDP decides to prepare a pitch for Heinz Ketchup, and Stan lets the news slip to Peggy, who shares it with Ted. Ted later decides that CGC should try to poach Heinz Ketchup, making Peggy feel guilty. Don and Joan are uncomfortable when Herb returns to the SCDP office, and Don purposely sabotages SCDP's meeting with Jaguar, enraging Pete. Don returns home and has flashbacks to his adolescence growing up in a brothel with his stepmother.
69	4	"To Have and to Hold"	Michael Uppendahl	Erin Levy	April 21, 2013	2.40
Joan tries to fire Scarlett, Harry's secretary, as punishment for Scarlett convincing Dawn to commit time card fraud. Furious, Harry bursts into a partners' meeting and questions Joan's partnership stake at SCDP. Bert and Roger give Harry a bonus but refuse to make him a partner, while an embarrassed Joan decides to promote Dawn to take over her office management duties. Don and Megan have dinner with Mel, the head writer of Megan's soap opera, and his wife Arlene; Mel unsuccessfully tries to encourage Don and Megan to join them in group sex. Don is uncomfortable with Megan performing a sex scene on the show and visits the set unannounced, embarrassing Megan. SCDP prepares a pitch for Heinz Ketchup, but the firm learns they are in a "bake-off" with CGC; Don listens to Peggy's pitch behind the closed door, both impressed and upset that she is using lessons she learned from him. After the pitch, Ken arrives and reveals that Raymond has fired SCDP, having learned of their meeting with Heinz Ketchup. Ted also reveals that Heinz Ketchup has no intention of leaving their much larger firm, and was using interest from smaller agencies to negotiate a better rate deal.
70	5	"The Flood"	Christopher Manley	Tom Smuts and Matthew Weiner	April 28, 2013	2.38
In April 1968, Peggy and Megan are up for an advertising award for Heinz Beans when the announcement that Dr. Martin Luther King, Jr. has been assassinated comes in. Work slows down at SCDP due to the resulting riots; Pete calls Harry a racist for being more concerned about losing money over the tragedy, with Bert unsuccessfully attempting to mediate before closing the office and sending everyone home. Ginsberg's father sets him up on a date with a daughter of a family friend. Don, Stan and Ginsberg meet with Roger's unorthodox acquaintance who is considering SCDP's services for his insurance agency. Peggy looks at buying an apartment on the Upper East Side, but Abe is dismayed at its location and convinces her to buy a building on the Upper West Side that they can renovate together. Henry decides to run for public office. Betty calls Don when he forgets to pick up the kids, and Don takes Bobby to see Planet of the Apes. Megan tells Don he's drinking too much and neglecting his children; Don admits that he has faked loving his children their entire lives, and marvels at having recently had a genuine moment of affection with them.
71	6	"For Immediate Release"	Jennifer Getzinger	Matthew Weiner	May 5, 2013	2.45
SCDP prepares for an IPO, unbeknownst to Don. At their dinner with Jaguar, Don, contemptuous of Herb, abruptly announces that SCDP no longer wants his business, enraging the partners—particularly Joan, who is furious given her paid tryst with Herb to land the deal. Meanwhile, SCDP loses the Vicks account after Pete encounters his father-in-law at a brothel; Trudy refuses to believe her father visited a prostitute and throws Pete out. Ted kisses Peggy after she consoles him about the future of their agency. Roger secures SCDP a spot with General Motors for the new Chevy project XP-887. On arriving in Detroit, Don finds Ted at the same bar, and they realize that General Motors intend to award the account to Dancer Fitzgerald, using SCDP and CGC merely to stage a competitive process and mine their ideas. To counter this, Don proposes merging the two agencies to improve their chances; the partners agree, and the merger succeeds. Afterwards, Don and Ted declare a nonplussed Peggy the copy chief of the new firm and task her with writing the press release announcing the merger of the two companies.
72	7	"Man with a Plan"	John Slattery	Semi Chellas and Matthew Weiner	May 12, 2013	2.36
The newly merged creative team of Sterling Cooper Draper Pryce and Cutler Gleason Chaough begin brainstorming a margarine campaign for Fleischmann's. Don feels threatened by Ted's authority and, after accepting Sylvia's offer for a midday tryst, arrives late to the creative meeting. Ted publicly rebukes him; later, Don attempts to make peace by sharing drinks, but Ted becomes visibly drunk, drawing Peggy's frustration. Traveling to Buffalo for a meeting, Don continues asserting control in his affair by confining Sylvia to a hotel room without telling her when he will return. When he returns, Sylvia breaks off the affair, saying she dreamt of his death and having to console Megan at his funeral. Pete's mother shows signs of dementia. As the CGC staff moves in, Joan falls ill, and Bob Benson discreetly escorts her to the hospital and secures expedited treatment. Roger fires Bob's supervisor Burt Peterson, but a grateful Joan saves Bob's job. It is announced that Robert F. Kennedy has been assassinated, and while a distraught Megan watches the news, Don reels in the aftermath of his break up with Sylvia.
73	8	"The Crash"	Michael Uppendahl	Jason Grote and Matthew Weiner	May 19, 2013	2.16
In flashbacks to the Depression era, Don is viciously beaten by Abigail after one of the prostitutes living in the house initiates a sexual encounter with him. In the present, the creative team works through the weekend on the Chevy campaign. Jim Cutler hires a physician to inject the creative staff with a stimulant to give them inspiration and enhanced energy for 72 hours. The stimulant affects staffers in different ways, including Don, who stays at the office looking for an old advertisement whose images and message were inspired by the prostitute, and honing a pitch to renew his affair with Sylvia. Peggy and Stan share an intimate kiss after Stan breaks down about how his cousin was killed in the Vietnam War. While staying at Don's apartment alone, Sally interrupts a disheveled burglar who pretends to be their "Grandma Ida". When he finally comes down from his high, Don returns home and collapses upon being confronted by Megan, Betty and the police over the robbery. The next morning, Don promises to make new resolutions and informs Ted and Cutler that he will not be involved with Chevy and will only approve copy and design from the staff.
74	9	"The Better Half"	Phil Abraham	Erin Levy and Matthew Weiner	May 26, 2013	1.88
Megan's performance on the set of To Have and To Hold is criticized by the director. Arlene consoles Megan and tries to kiss her, but is rebuffed. Roger loses Margaret's trust after he takes his grandson to a scary movie. Roger gives Joan a gift for Kevin, wanting to be part of his son's life, but Joan counters that Roger is not a dependable father figure. Peggy grows increasingly anxious about neighborhood crime and accidentally stabs Abe in the abdomen when he startles her; Abe breaks up with her on the ambulance ride to the hospital. Pete meets with Duck, who now works as a corporate headhunter; Duck questions Pete's role at the merged agency and reveals an opening for a company based in Wichita, but Pete refuses to leave New York. While driving to Bobby's summer camp, Betty runs into Don at a gas station. The three bond again, and Betty and Don have sex at the camp lodge; Betty reveals that she is no longer mad at Don, but admits she is happy with Henry. The next morning, the encounter grows unacknowledged as Betty sits with Henry while Don remains alone.
75	10	"A Tale of Two Cities"	John Slattery	Janet Leahy and Matthew Weiner	June 2, 2013	2.45
Set against the backdrop of the 1968 Democratic National Convention and ensuing confrontation between police and protesters in Chicago, Don, Roger, and Harry travel to Los Angeles to meet with clients, including Carnation. The three attend a Hollywood party, where Don smokes hashish and hallucinates a pregnant, hippie Megan. Former employee Danny Siegel, who was fired by Roger for being a poor copywriter, is at the party, now working as a successful director and producer. Don winds up face down in the pool and Roger saves him. In New York, Joan meets a client for cosmetics giant Avon. Seeing this as her opportunity to bring some legitimacy to her status as a partner, Joan deliberately cuts Pete out of a meeting. After a scolding from Ted and Pete, Peggy saves Joan with a fake phone call from Avon. Cutler struggles connecting with the SCDP staff, particularly Ginsberg. Ted informs the other partners that he has broken through the management layers at Chevy, and Cutler later adds Bob to the account, without input from Roger or Don, who are still in California. Sterling Cooper & Partners is ultimately decided as the name of the recently merged firm.
76	11	"Favors"	Jennifer Getzinger	Semi Chellas and Matthew Weiner	June 9, 2013	2.17
Roger tells Don about pursuing Sunkist, and they inform Ted before a partners' meeting; Ted angrily objects because he and Cutler are pitching Ocean Spray, creating a conflict. Pete is concerned when his mother implies that she is having a sexual relationship with her nurse Manolo. When Pete questions Bob, who recommended Manolo, Bob makes a subtle advance that Pete rejects. A horrified Peggy attempts to kill a rat in her apartment. Sally and her friend Julie stay with Don and Megan for a Model United Nations event and meet the Rosens' son Mitchell, who has left college and is classified 1-A for the draft. Don mentions Mitchell's situation at a Chevy dinner, and Ted later offers a contact in the Air National Guard to help Mitchell, but only if Don drops Sunkist. Don attempts to reveal the news to Arnold but reaches Sylvia, who is thrilled and grateful for his intervention. Julie signs Sally's name to a note praising Mitchell and slips it under the Rosens' door; when Sally tries to retrieve it, she finds Don and Sylvia having sex and runs out. That night, Arnold and Mitchell thank Don, while Sally withdraws. Don confronts Sally and tells her he was "comforting" Sylvia.
77	12	"The Quality of Mercy"	Phil Abraham	Andre Jacquemetton & Maria Jacquemetton	June 16, 2013	2.06
While upland hunting in Michigan with Chevy executives, Ken is accidentally shot in the face with birdshot. Back in New York, he tells Pete he can no longer handle the stress of the Chevy account; Pete seizes the opportunity to take it over, and the partners approve, assigning Bob to assist. Suspicious of Bob, Pete asks Duck to investigate and learns Bob falsified his background and had worked as a West Virginia manservant. Pete confronts Bob, but ultimately keeps the secret to retain leverage. Meanwhile, Betty tells Don that Sally has expressed interest in enrolling at a boarding school. While attending an overnight visit at the school, Sally impresses her peers by inviting Glen, who brings alcohol and drugs; the next day, Betty says the school's evaluation of Sally was favorable. Don takes a day off when Harry reports that Sunkist wants to expand into television. Although Don cites a conflict with Ocean Spray, he reverses course after seeing Ted and Peggy together at a movie. Attempting to mend tensions, Don supports Ted during a St. Joseph Aspirin pitch but undercuts and humiliates him, later warning Ted that his feelings for Peggy is impairing his judgment.
78	13	"In Care Of"	Matthew Weiner	Carly Wray and Matthew Weiner	June 23, 2013	2.69
Stan volunteers to relocate to California to build Sunkist, and the agency receives an RFP from Hershey's Chocolate, assigning Don to pitch. After a drunken fight with a preacher lands him in jail, Don tells Megan he wants to move west and start over. Betty informs him Sally has been suspended from her boarding school for Thanksgiving. Pete learns his mother fell from a cruise ship and had married Manolo; suspecting murder, he blames Bob, who then exposes Pete's poor driving before Chevy executives and takes over the account. Ted confesses his love to Peggy and sleeps with her, but decides to move to California with his family to run Sunkist and distance himself. Don tells Ted that he is already moving to California and they cannot both go, then delivers an initially polished Hershey pitch before suddenly confessing he was raised in a brothel and that Hershey bars were rare treats earned collecting coins from clients; he tells the executives they do not need advertising. He then yields Sunkist to Ted. The partners place Don on mandatory leave, naming Lou Avery acting creative head as Ted relocates. Megan leaves Don, Pete departs for Los Angeles, Joan invites Roger to Thanksgiving for Kevin's sake, and Don shows his children the brothel where he grew up.

== Production and writing ==
Matthew Weiner and the rest of the writers began work on the sixth season in July 2012. Principal photography for the sixth season began in October 2012. Cast members John Slattery and Jon Hamm each again directed episodes this season; Slattery directed two, while Hamm directed one episode. Slattery had previously directed three episodes for the series, while Hamm made his directorial debut in season five with the episode "Tea Leaves". The two-hour premiere had portions shot on-location in Hawaii. Weiner commented on the structure of the premiere, saying, "it's really constructed like a film. It is its own story and hopefully it foreshadows the rest of the season." Weiner said regarding the final 26 episodes of the series, "I can feel the end coming. I also felt like I'm not going to do 13 episodes of set-up; it should set itself up as it goes, as it always does." Executive producers and writing team Andre Jacquemetton and Maria Jacquemetton, the only writers besides Weiner to be on the writing staff for every season, departed the series after the conclusion of the sixth season to develop new projects.

=== Crew ===
Series creator Matthew Weiner also served as showrunner and executive producer, and is credited as a writer on 11 of the 13 episodes of the season, often co-writing the episodes with another writer. Erin Levy was promoted to producer and wrote two episodes. Semi Chellas was promoted to supervising producer and wrote two episodes. Janet Leahy was promoted to executive producer and wrote one episode. Writing team Andre Jacquemetton and Maria Jacquemetton continued as executive producers and co-wrote one episode together. Jonathan Igla was promoted to story editor and wrote one episode. New additions to the writing staff included co-producer Tom Smuts; staff writer Jason Grote and Carly Wray, who served as an assistant to the writers.

Scott Hornbacher, Michael Uppendahl, Jennifer Getzinger, John Slattery, and Phil Abraham each directed two episodes for the season. The remaining episodes were directed by cast member Jon Hamm, cinematographer Christopher Manley, and series creator Matthew Weiner, who directs each season finale.

== Reception ==
=== Critical response ===
The sixth season of Mad Men received widespread critical acclaim. Review aggregator Rotten Tomatoes reports that 98% of 44 critics have given the season a positive review with an average score of 8.6/10. The site's consensus is: "The passage of time has done little to dull Mad Men's rich cast of characters, who continue to confound." On Metacritic, the sixth season scored an 88 out of 100 based on 28 reviews, indicating "universal acclaim".

David Hinckley of the New York Daily News had high praise for the show's longevity, claiming that "While many shows that have reached this point in the road have left their creative peak behind, Mad Men shows no such erosion. It still has things it wants to say and it still has the poetry to say them well. With regard to the season's first episode, Tim Goodman of The Hollywood Reporter stated, "What’s intriguing and partly amazing about the two-hour 'movie' called 'The Doorway' that opens the season April 7 is that Weiner has not lost his touch at writing a beautifully crafted script—jammed with the sadness and humor and personal revelations we’ve all come to appreciate. But in addition to that, he's decided to really hit home Mad Men's key theme in the first two hours with a kind of ferocity of intent we’ve rarely seen from him." Jeff Jensen of Entertainment Weekly had a decidedly more mixed reaction, stating, "Like Betty's frumpy frocks, Mad Men supersize episodes aren't flattering. Weiner should stick with tighter, denser storytelling packages. I hope he also delivers the season of change that the premiere seems to promise." Matt Zoller Seitz of Vulture says that "It's a clever, at times tricky season opener. In 'Lost'-like style, it strategically withholds key information that would help us make immediate sense of Don's behavior, which by turns suggests a prisoner, a sleepwalker, and a ghost."

Jace Lacob of the Daily Beast stated that "Weiner is both archeologist and astronaut, and Season 6 of Mad Men is no exception, a beautifully realized and dazzling re-creation of our collective past and a glimpse of the infinite and unknowable." Alan Sepinwall of HitFix said, "It continues to be one of the most satisfying dramas in the history of the medium." David Wiegland of the San Francisco Chronicle said that "Don Draper's journey has been and remains maddening, in a very good way as far as what makes a great TV show" and that "Like a great novel, Mad Men has character depths yet to plumb." In a rave review, Maureen Ryan of The Huffington Post stated that "The AMC drama is full of sharp writing, ambiguous segues, effective surprises and the usual array of pitch-perfect performances."

=== Accolades ===
For the 65th Primetime Emmy Awards, the sixth season received 12 nominations, including for Outstanding Drama Series, Jon Hamm for Outstanding Lead Actor in a Drama Series, Elisabeth Moss for Outstanding Lead Actress in a Drama Series, Christina Hendricks for Outstanding Supporting Actress in a Drama Series, Robert Morse and Harry Hamlin for Outstanding Guest Actor in a Drama Series, and Linda Cardellini for Outstanding Guest Actress in a Drama Series.

The season was nominated for Best Drama Series for the 2014 Writers Guild of America Awards.
