= Nixon vs. Kennedy =

Nixon vs. Kennedy (Richard Nixon vs. John F. Kennedy) can refer to:

- 1960 United States presidential election, when Nixon and Kennedy were the candidates from the two major parties
- any of the 1960 United States presidential debates between the two
- "Nixon vs. Kennedy" (Mad Men), the penultimate episode of the first season of the AMC television series Mad Men

See also

- Nixon v. Fitzgerald, an early 1980s U.S. Supreme Court case involving Richard Nixon
