= The Summer Man =

- Mad Men episode
- Joey's obscene drawing depicting Joan Harris in the midst of a sexual act with Lane Pryce.
- Episode no.: Season 4 Episode 8
- Directed by: Phil Abraham
- Written by: Lisa Albert; Janet Leahy; Matthew Weiner
- Original air date: September 12, 2010
- Running time: 48 minutes

Guest appearances
- Christopher Stanley as Henry Francis; Matt Long as Joey Baird; Anne Dudek as Francine Hansen; Sam Page as Greg Harris; Cara Buono as Faye Miller; Jay R. Ferguson as Stan Rizzo; Anna Camp as Bethany Van Nuys; Randee Heller as Ida Blankenship; Jared Gilmore as Bobby Draper

Episode chronology
← Previous "The Suitcase"	Next → "The Beautiful Girls"
- Mad Men season 4

"The Summer Man" is the eighth episode of the fourth season of the American television drama series Mad Men, and the 47th overall episode of the series. It aired on the AMC channel in the United States on September 12, 2010. The episode was written by series creator Matthew Weiner and writers Janet Leahy and Lisa Albert. It was directed by Phil Abraham.

Don becomes more self-reflective and physically active as he attempts to curb his drinking. While Don pulls himself out of his existential tailspin, he pursues the company of Dr. Faye Miller. A subplot also deals with Joan's role in the office as she clashes with an obnoxious insubordinate employee.

The episode was well received by television critics, but the use of voice-over was divisive. The episode was watched by 2.3 million viewers on its original airing. Christina Hendricks submitted this episode for consideration as her nomination for Primetime Emmy Award for Outstanding Supporting Actress in a Drama Series at the 63rd Primetime Emmy Awards.

== Plot ==
Following the death of Anna Draper, Don has taken a self-reflective turn, writing his thoughts into a journal in an attempt to steady his mind. His attempts at swimming reveal to him that he is not the physically imposing man he once saw himself as. He also begins the process of cutting back on his drinking, though it is difficult with the copious alcohol use in the SCDP offices.

Meanwhile, at the office, Joan tells off raucous creative Joey. Joey undermines her to her face, telling her that she does nothing but walk around like she "wants to get raped". He continues to undermine her behind her back, even drawing an obscene cartoon of Joan giving Lane fellatio and taping it to Joan's office window. After talking with Joey, Peggy is personally offended and goes to Don, who tells Peggy to fire Joey herself. Peggy tells Joey to apologize, but he says it was funny and makes sexist remarks about working with women, so Peggy fires him. In the elevator, Joan is upset with Peggy for firing Joey on her behalf, as it only reinforces the stereotype about working women that they are frivolous, humorless, and vindictive, as well as shows Peggy is "important", while Joan is but a "glorified secretary".

Don goes on another date with the much younger Bethany Van Nuys. Bethany and Don awkwardly run into Betty and Henry while out at a restaurant, causing Betty to have a minor anxious outburst at Henry. Henry and Betty fight in the car as Henry wonders aloud whether Betty is still in love with Don. The next morning, Betty apologizes and explains that Don was the only other man she had ever been with. Henry purposely rams his car into the boxes Don has stored in the garage in the Ossining house, then phones Don at work and asks him to remove his boxes, cruelly suggesting Don do so before Gene's birthday party, silently emphasizing that Don is not invited. When Don arrives at the appointed time, he finds his boxes piled on the curb near where Henry is mowing the lawn, studiously ignoring Don.

At dinner, Bethany presses Don to move their relationship forward. On the way home, Don gladly receives oral sex from Bethany in the backseat of a taxicab but does not see her again. Don officially asks Dr. Faye Miller out on a date, where the two bond, engaging in a romantic kiss. Surprisingly to Faye, Don rejects any further romantic advances by her. Don, content, walks into his son's birthday party at the Francis household. Betty stops Henry from confronting Don (who wasn't invited), reasoning "we have everything".

== Final appearances ==
- Bethany Van Nuys: A stage actress and old college friend of Jane's who is set to be Don's date. However, their relationship becomes very brief in the end.
- Joey Baird: A freelance loudmouth artist and cartoonist at SCDP whose boorish comments lead him to bully and go against Joan and get fired from the firm once and for all by Peggy.

== Reception ==
=== Ratings ===
"The Summer Man" was viewed by 2.3 million viewers in its original airing and was watched 0.7 million viewers in the age demographic of adults 18–49.

=== Critical reception ===
The episode was received warmly by most television critics. Many were critical of the use of voice-overs, an aspect unique to the episode; the voice-overs were used to articulate Don's journal entries. The A.V. Club writer Keith Phipps said the voice-overs were "still a representation of Don, not Don himself", saying, "How Don writes about himself says a lot about how he sees himself", comparing the style of the episode to lonely man film noir. Matt Zoller Seitz of The New Republic said the episode was "one of just two true ensemble episodes" in the season, the other being "Public Relations". He referred to the Joan subplot as "colorful and tense" but wrote, "the ultimate resolution of the plot blunted potential charges of didacticism. It was agonizing watching Joan struggle to deal with Joey's swinishness with cutting remarks that barely scratched his thick skin."

James Poniewozik of TIME magazine said the use of voice-over "undercuts one of Mad Men’s greatest strengths, which is its use of irony and understatement to show how characters' words and actions often belie their real thoughts and meaning." Poniewozik also noted: "As we get farther into what we usually think of in pop-culture terms as 'the ’60s,' it gets harder even for a show as brilliant as Mad Men to avoid overfamiliar takes", singling out the scene where Don watches Vietnam War news reports. Alan Sepinwall of HitFix said, "'The Summer Man' is an episode I expect I'm going to need to revisit a time or 20 before I decide how I ultimately feel about some of its stylistic departures from the Mad Men norm", referring to the use of voice-over and the camera effect of Don's pulling away from the office when he isn't drinking. The Huffington Post writer William Bradley called the episode, "another very fine and very consequential episode of Mad Men".
