= American Cinema Editors Award for Best Edited One Hour Series for Commercial Television =

The American Cinema Editors Award for Best Edited One Hour Series for Commercial Television, or the ACE Eddie Award, is an award presented by the American Cinema Editors to the best edited episodes of a one-hour series featured on broadcast or basic cable television. It is presented annually. The years denote when each episode first aired. The current eligibility period is the calendar year. The winners are highlighted.

== Winners and nominees ==
=== 2010s ===
Year	Show	Episode	Editor(s)	Network
2010	The Walking Dead	"Days Gone By"	Hunter Via	AMC
2010	Breaking Bad	"Sunset"	Kelley Dixon	AMC
2010	Friday Night Lights	"I Can't"	Mark Conte	The 101 Network / NBC
2010	Glee	"Journey to Regionals"	Bradley Buecker, Doc Crotzer, Joe Leonard & John Roberts	Fox
2010	The Good Wife	"Running"	Scott Vickrey	CBS
2011	Breaking Bad	"Face Off"	Skip Macdonald	AMC
2011	Breaking Bad	"End Times"	Kelley Dixon	AMC
2011	Friday Night Lights	"Always"	Angela M. Catanzaro	The 101 Network / NBC
2011	The Good Wife	"Real Deal"	Hibah Schweitzer	CBS
2011	The Walking Dead	"Save the Last One"	Hunter Via	AMC
2012	Breaking Bad	"Dead Freight"	Skip Macdonald	AMC
2012	Breaking Bad	"Gliding Over All"	Kelley Dixon	AMC
2012	Mad Men	"The Other Woman"	Tom Wilson	AMC
2012	Nashville	"Pilot"	Keith Henderson	ABC
2012	Smash	"Pilot"	Andrew Weisblum	NBC
2013	Breaking Bad	"Felina"	Skip MacDonald	AMC
2013	Breaking Bad	"Buried"	Skip MacDonald and Sharidan Williams-Sotelo	AMC
2013	Breaking Bad	"Granite State"	Kelley Dixon and Chris McCaleb	AMC
2013	Breaking Bad	"Ozymandias"	Skip MacDonald	AMC
2013	The Good Wife	"Hitting the Fan"	Scott Vickrey	CBS
2014	Sherlock	"His Last Vow"	Yan Miles	PBS
2014	24: Live Another Day	"Day 9: 10:00 p.m. – 11:00 a.m."	Scott Powell	Fox
2014	The Good Wife	"A Few Words"	Scott Vickrey	CBS
2014	Mad Men	"Waterloo"	Christopher Gay	AMC
2014	Madam Secretary	"Pilot"	Elena Maganini and Michael Ornstein	CBS
2015	Mad Men	"Person to Person"	Tom Wilson	AMC
2015	Better Call Saul	"Five-O"	Kelley Dixon	AMC
2015	Better Call Saul	"Uno"	Skip Macdonald	AMC
2015	Fargo	"Did you do this? No, you did it!"	Skip Macdonald and Curtis Thurber	FX
2015	The Good Wife	"Restraint"	Scott Vickrey	CBS
2016	This is Us	"Pilot"	David L. Bertman	NBC
2016	Better Call Saul	"Fifi"	Skip Macdonald	AMC
2016	Better Call Saul	"Klick"	Skip Macdonald and Curtis Thurber	AMC
2016	Better Call Saul	"Nailed"	Kelley Dixon and Chris McCaleb	AMC
2016	Mr. Robot	"eps2.4_m4ster-s1ave.aes"	Philip Harrison	USA
