= The Grown-Ups (Mad Men) =

- Mad Men episode
- Episode no.: Season 3 Episode 12
- Directed by: Barbet Schroeder
- Written by: Brett Johnson; Matthew Weiner
- Original air date: November 1, 2009
- Running time: 47 minutes

Guest appearances
- Jared Harris as Lane Pryce; Mark Moses as Herman "Duck" Phillips; Talia Balsam as Mona Sterling; Kiernan Shipka as Sally Draper; Alison Brie as Trudy Campbell; Elizabeth Rice as Margaret Sterling; Christopher Stanley as Henry Francis; Peyton List as Jane Sterling; Judy Kain as Olive Healy; Carla Gallo as Karen Ericson; Laura Regan as Jennifer Crane

Episode chronology
← Previous "The Gypsy and the Hobo"	Next → "Shut the Door. Have a Seat."
- Mad Men season 3

The Grown-Ups is the name of thirty-eighth episode of the American television drama series Mad Men and the twelfth episode of the show's third season. It was written by Brett Johnson along with series creator Matthew Weiner, and it was directed by Barbet Schroeder. The episode originally aired on AMC in the United States on November 1, 2009.

== Plot ==
Lane Pryce breaks the news to Pete Campbell that Ken Cosgrove will be made Head of Accounts, and Pete will essentially be his deputy. Pete accepts the news graciously, then abruptly leaves for the day. While waiting for the elevator, Peggy Olson chats with her roommate, who dislikes Duck Phillips, with whom Peggy is having an affair.

Margaret Sterling complains to her mother, Mona, about her stepmother, Jane, giving her marital advice and an expensive gift in attempts to win her over. Margaret calls Roger and tells him again she doesn't want Jane at her wedding. He and Mona tell Margaret to stop threatening to cancel the wedding and to calm down. When Jane arrives home, Roger reprimands her for upsetting Margaret and Jane locks herself in the bathroom.

The next day, Pete ponders his future at Sterling Cooper with Harry Crane, while Don Draper has an argument with Lane about his refusal to hire a new art director since Salvatore Romano's firing. At lunch, Duck calls Peggy at the office and invites her to a hotel room for an afternoon tryst.

News that President Kennedy has been shot in Dallas reaches Sterling Cooper, and everyone gathers around the television in Harry's office. At the Draper household, Betty learns that Kennedy has died from his wounds, and both she and her housekeeper Carla burst into tears on the couch. Duck, who had been watching the coverage but had unplugged the television shortly before Peggy's arrival, turns the news back on after the two have had sex to discover that Kennedy has died. Margaret Sterling, decked out in her wedding dress, sobs that her wedding, which is the following day, has been ruined.

Don returns home and tells Betty not to let the children watch the news. He tries to reassure them. The next day, it remains unclear whether Margaret's wedding will still be held. Despondent over the assassination and Pete being passed over, he and Trudy decide not to attend. Don convinces Betty to go to the wedding, which is sparsely attended.

Roger tells the guests to sit wherever they like and help themselves, since there are no waiters, and is then forced to find a replacement wedding cake when the baker does not appear. Many of the guests, including his wife Jane, Bert Cooper, and Ken, remain in the hotel's kitchen, glued to the news coverage of the assassination aftermath. Henry Francis arrives at the wedding, and Betty is briefly dismayed to see a woman on his arm, only to smile when she learns that the woman is Henry's daughter. While dancing during the wedding, Don assures Betty that everything will be fine, but Betty seems unconvinced and he kisses her to reassure her. Meanwhile, Henry's daughter notices him glancing at Betty and asks him why he keeps looking at her.

The next day, Betty sees Lee Harvey Oswald killed by Jack Ruby live on television. Distraught, Betty leaves the house to meet Henry, who proposes that they get married. When Betty returns home, she informs Don that she no longer loves him, telling him that when he kissed her at the wedding, she didn't feel anything.

Don leaves the next morning for work without saying a word to Betty. In the office, he finds Peggy reworking the advertising campaign strategy for AquaNet (which would have featured two couples in a convertible and likely invoked memories of the assassination). Peggy invites Don to watch Kennedy's funeral in Cooper's office, but he declines.

== Production ==
"The Grown-Ups" was written by Brett Johnson and Matthew Weiner; it was directed by Barbet Schroeder, whose previous directorial work includes the films Reversal of Fortune and Single White Female.

Series creator Matthew Weiner explained that “since the show started, all people have ever wanted to talk to me about was the Kennedy assassination. I really wanted to do the story differently. I wanted to show how it impacted our characters. But I also wanted to show what it would be like to really be knocked off your feet, to really have it penetrate into your life in such a gigantic way.” Weiner further explained that “I called it ‘The Grown Ups,’ because to me, it's a lot of people realizing that they're orphaned, or that their father is gone, or that it's time to be an adult.” Weiner emphasized the importance of depicting the murder of Lee Harvey Oswald on November 24, explaining “[w]hen Oswald is shot, there is a kind of nihilism that takes over because the system does not work....Everything breaks down, and I wanted this to be the thing that says to Betty ‘that’s it. That’s enough. It’s time to move on.’” Addressing her character Betty’s response to the assassination, actress January Jones stated that “she’s letting this event become her emotional release.” Of the last scene in the episode, which features Don and Peggy in the office, actress Elisabeth Moss claimed to love it because it showed how the characters are “trying to put [the assassination] aside, but they can’t quite put it aside—it’s too big.”

== First appearances ==
- Bruce Pike: Mona's fiancée and Margaret's stepfather invited to important family events by Mona.
- Eleanor Francis: Henry's daughter and Pauline's granddaughter who is also one of Margaret's friends.

== Reception ==
=== Critical reception ===
“The Grown Ups” received mixed reviews from critics.

James Poniewozik, at Time Magazine, applauded the episode for “showing how various characters reacted to the news in their own way.” He felt Don's response was “spot-on,” appreciating the way “his first instinct is to shield the children from the news and get them away from the TV.”

Other critics found significant faults with the episode. Alan Sepinwall, of New Jersey's The Star Ledger, was less impressed with this week's entry, writing that “The Grown Ups” was “the first episode of season three I’ve found truly disappointing.” From his perspective, “watching a TV show about characters glued to their TV sets feels particularly slothful—and it felt even more unsatisfying coming on the heels of the astonishing second half of last week’s ‘The Gypsy and the Hobo.’” Logan Hill’s assessment for New York Magazine's vulture.com was negative, too. Hill claimed that the episode “felt rushed and overstuffed…with too many quick-cut scenes of characters watching television, and a few important moments (like Henry’s proposal and Betty’s confrontation with Don) given far too little screen time.”

Several critics had more mixed feelings about the episode. Writing for The Onion’s The AV Club, Keith Phipps awarded the episode a “B+,” explaining that it “entered slow motion at a certain point, but while I don’t think the slowness always worked I appreciated the commitment to staying close to the characters as they experienced the shock and its aftershocks.” He added “there was an extra degree of care put into the images this week and an unnerving immediacy to some of the newsbreaking scenes, which echoed my generation’s experience with 9/11, whether it tried to or not.” Luke de Smet, at Slant Magazine, also had a more mixed assessment. Admitting that “this wasn’t one of the season’s truly great episodes,” he nevertheless found the episode to be “formally and stylistically interesting in its own right.”

In a 2014 Rolling Stone article (published just before the Season 7 premiere), “The Grown-Ups” was ranked as the 28th best episode of the series. In a BuzzFeed article published following the series finale, the episode was ranked the 59th best episode of the entire series.

=== Ratings ===
On its original American broadcast on November 1, 2009, on AMC, the episode was viewed by 1.78 million viewers.

=== Accolades ===
For their work on this episode, Johnson and Weiner were nominated for best "episodic drama" at the Writers Guild of America Award in 2010.

== See also ==
- Assassination of John F. Kennedy in popular culture
