= Far Away Places (Mad Men) =

- Mad Men episode
- Episode no.: Season 5 Episode 6
- Directed by: Scott Hornbacher
- Written by: Semi Chellas; Matthew Weiner
- Original air date: April 22, 2012
- Running time: 48 minutes

Guest appearances
- Peyton List as Jane Sterling; Ben Feldman as Michael Ginsberg; Charlie Hofheimer as Abe Drexler; Stephen Mendel as Morris Ginsberg; John Sloman as Raymond Geiger; Lisa K. Wyatt as Brenda (FKA Waitress); Bess Armstrong as Catherine Orcutt; Tony Pasqualini as Sandy Orcutt; Tom Beyer as Dale Vanderwort; Joseph Williamson as Man

Episode chronology
| ← Previous "Signal 30" | Next → "At the Codfish Ball" |
- Mad Men season 5

"Far Away Places" is the sixth episode of the fifth season of the American television drama series Mad Men and the 58th episode of the series overall. It was written by series creator and executive producer Matthew Weiner and writer Semi Chellas, and directed by Scott Hornbacher. It originally aired on AMC in the United States on April 22, 2012.

The episode takes place almost entirely over a single day, telling three stories in a non-linear narrative. Peggy becomes alienated after separate fights with her boyfriend Abe and a client. Roger and Jane take LSD with a group of intellectuals, altering how they see the world and allowing them to speak honestly about their marriage. Don and Megan leave the office and take an impromptu road trip to Plattsburgh, New York, which doesn't turn out as planned after Megan becomes aggrieved with how Don treats her.

"Far Away Places" was watched by 2.6 million viewers and achieved 0.9 million viewers in the key 18–49 demographic. The episode received overwhelming critical acclaim, with many critics noting the episode's formal experiments with and focus on the passage of time. The sequence where Roger and Jane take LSD was particularly celebrated for the visual excellence and performances by John Slattery and Peyton List. The theme of the episode was pinpointed by the series writers and television journalists as the desire to escape.

== Plot ==
The episode is split into three vignettes that take place almost entirely during a single day in a non-linear narrative following the lives of Peggy, Roger, and Don.

=== Peggy ===
The episode begins with Peggy's day and a heated argument with her boyfriend Abe, over her preoccupation with work and the effect this has on their sex life. The argument ends with Abe's leaving in a huff. After Don pulls Megan away for an impromptu trip to a Howard Johnson's hotel in upstate New York, Peggy has to pitch to the Heinz executives without them and unsuccessfully tries to sell the Heinz executives on her concept. Frustrated, she leaves work, has a couple of drinks, and goes to see the film Born Free (1966). She sees a young man smoking marijuana behind her, partakes herself, and eventually gives him a hand job. She returns to her office to see Michael Ginsberg arguing with his father. After being told off by Ginsberg for eavesdropping, she falls asleep in Don's office. She awakens to a call from Don, who seems alarmed for unknown reasons. Don hangs up on her, and Peggy returns to her office. When Peggy asks about Ginsberg's life, Ginsberg initially claims to be a Martian, stating that Morris Ginsberg is not his father. Michael was born in a Nazi concentration camp and, after its liberation, Morris claimed him from a Swedish orphanage when he was 5 years old. Peggy returns home, affected by this story, and calls Abe. She tells him about Ginsberg and asks him to come over to be with her.

=== Roger ===
In the morning, Roger invites Don to go on a trip with him to a Howard Johnson's in Plattsburgh, New York, hoping to get out of a dinner party with his wife Jane's "snooty friends" and is subsequently disappointed when Don decides to take Megan on the trip instead. Roger and Jane go to the party, which is hosted by Jane's therapist and her husband. After dinner, Roger asks Jane if they can leave, but Jane reminds Roger that he agreed to take LSD with the group and begs him to stay, as she doesn't want to go through the experience alone. Roger is initially unimpressed with the drug but comes around after his consciousness begins to change with vivid audio-visual hallucinations. Roger and Jane return home via taxi and take a bath together, during which Roger imagines he is watching the 1919 World Series from the bathtub. The couple then talks candidly about their marriage for the first time. During this moment of awareness, Jane admits that she knows the marriage is over. Jane shares with Roger that her love for him has always been true, and asks him if he feels the same. He confesses that he used to love her and still finds her beautiful. The next morning, a jovial Roger says goodbye to a shocked Jane, telling her that she looks lovely, as always. Jane appears regretful about what she said the previous night. Roger says he never felt more connected to her than he did the night before, reminding her that they discussed philosophy and that she even "spoke in German", to which Jane replies she doesn't even know German and that it must have been Yiddish. Jane dolefully turns away Roger's final kiss after commenting that the divorce will "be expensive", and they linger together on the bed for a few moments longer.

=== Don ===
The episode's finale is Don's day and the trip to Howard Johnson's Restaurant and Motor Lodge in Plattsburgh. As he and Megan eat in the restaurant, Megan expresses her frustration at having her needs and desires take a back seat to Don's. The discussion escalates into a fight, during which Megan makes a hurtful remark about Don's mother, and Don storms out and drives off without her. Don returns sometime later and begins to worry when he can't find Megan. He spends hours looking for and waiting for her, calling Peggy (the other side of the conversation from the first part of the episode) as well as Megan's mother in Montreal.

After waiting for hours at Howard Johnson's and phoning home repeatedly, Don drives home in the early morning to find Megan in their apartment with the security chain on the door. Don kicks the door in, violently struggles with Megan, and chases her through the apartment. Megan and Don trip and collapse on the floor as Megan weeps. Don tearfully hugs her at the waist and tells her he thought he had lost her.

=== Epilogue ===
That morning, Megan and Don return to Sterling Cooper Draper Pryce. Don is beckoned to the conference room, where Bert Cooper admonishes him for being "on love leave". Don replies that his love life is none of Bert's business. Bert retorts that it is, in fact, his business and admits astonishment that the firm is running as well as it is with how little Don is actually working. Bert leaves Don standing alone in the conference room as Don looks through the picture windows at the employees going about their business. Roger, full of enthusiasm, pops into the conference room and tells Don he has an announcement: "It's going to be a beautiful day!"

== Production ==
Creator Matthew Weiner said "Far Away Places" was inspired by "anthologized French films" with "lots of short stories in them", with all three short stories linked by a thematic "desire to go away". He further explained that "Peggy has this moment where she tries to be Don and fails, and then goes on Peggy's version of Don – sexually irresponsible, and drunk, and working". Elisabeth Moss said the handjob Peggy gives a stranger in the theatre is a "moment of forgetting" after the frustrating Heinz pitch.

Weiner spoke about the structure of the episode in June 2012:

Structurally, I love this French movie by Max Ophüls called Le Plaisir. It's three or four Guy de Maupassant stories that are told by a narrator, and then characters start to appear behind each other, their stories overlap and they are just walking through, and you realize it's a complete world. What I loved about that was just telling the story from that one person's point of view. In Peggy's story, she's in every scene, nothing happens without her there. And it's the same thing with Don and the same thing with Roger. So you're really getting this very private perspective, and then thematically holding it together by saying, "Here, this is about the status of the relationship." We weren't sure that it was going to work. The hardest part was breaking it up for commercials so that the Peggy and the Roger stories would be in the same segment and you wouldn't come back and think you were in the middle of another episode.

He spoke about the writing of a scene of the episode in August 2012:

I had, in the writers room, given this speech about Ginsberg saying he was a Martian. I delivered it as Ginsberg. We knew that Peggy's story was going to climax with that, and it was going to be their great moment of intimacy; he would distract her from her failure and bond with her in that strange way that people who feel separate do. Then, when we were writing the draft, I got the notes from the room, and the speech was like one sentence. We searched everywhere, and it turned out I had never pitched more than that one sentence: "I'm a Martian." I had a great version of it, but it turned out it had all been in my head in one way or another. It all had to come from scratch. Once I reduced the panic and tried to re-create it, it did happen. So, to me, it still has a magical quality to it.

Weiner characterized Roger's acid trip as an experience of "complete honesty" and an "experience of empathy, something he's probably never experienced in his life. He doesn't see the world through other people's lives and that kind of epiphany to me is very beautiful, even though it's the end of the relationship. They are alone in the truth together".

While discussing the fight between Don and Megan, Weiner commented on the violence and passion, noting that "what you get is that Don loves this woman" and that Megan is "everything that's good to him". Jessica Pare commented on Don's lack of respect for her work, and Jon Hamm judged Don's actions as "immature". Hamm regarded Don's fear as "genuine" when he is unsure of Megan's whereabouts. The flashback scene between Don and Megan in the car was actually shot for the fourth season finale, "Tomorrowland", written and directed by Weiner, but was cut. Weiner decided to reinsert this scene into the episode as a flashback. The exterior scenes of the Howard Johnson's hotel were filmed in October 2011 at the Regency Inn and Suites in Baldwin Park, California. The hotel operated as a Howard Johnson's from 1967 until it was sold in 1995.

Editor Christopher Gay spoke about the episode in August 2012:

Narratively speaking, we wanted the stories of these three relations of Peggy, Roger, and Don to be their own story. We wanted to give you a little bit more each time you saw each of the three story lines so that when you got to the third one, everything totally made sense. I've talked to people and they've had to watch it a few times to fully digest. Also, the score in the episode is pretty unique and more tonal and atmospheric than what we normally do. It's a guide, too, that helps you feel when one story is ending and another is coming in and knowing that the shift is happening. I think the score and the sound design definitely helped guide the narrative.

== Reception ==
=== Critical reception ===
The episode received overwhelmingly laudatory reviews from television critics, particularly for its unusual departure from the standard Mad Men episode structure and is considered to be one of the best in the series. Alan Sepinwall of HitFix exalted the episode and the "more formally experimental" season, admitting, "I'm still not sure I understood 100% of it. But I know I liked it. A lot." Sepinwall characterized "Far Away Places" as "an episode that gave the feel of dropping acid even when everyone on camera was stone sober. Matt Weiner, co-writer Semi Chellas, director Scott Hornbacher, and the actors combined to give us some of the most memorable moments the show has ever done." Emily VanDerWerff of The A.V. Club gave it an A grade, compared it to previous "structurally daring" episodes like "Seven Twenty Three" and "The Jet Set", and praised the director for the "beautifully shot" episode and the "gorgeous image of [Roger] and Jane lying, heads touching, on the floor, admitting their marriage just isn't working", while noting that the enemy of the season is "the passage of time itself".

Verne Gay of Newsday called it a good, but difficult, episode, saying, "the story lines were all parallel – it was even an anthology, with each story mirroring the next (bringing to mind that memorable scene when Roger, under the influence, is looking in the mirror and told to look away) ... the themes of male-female entanglement, and disentangle (and yes, hair, once again is a predominant metaphor.) The themes of travel ... of being a stranger in a strange land ... of life on Mars, or in Plattsburgh ... of alienation, pursuit, and of a generation born during the Holocaust, amid the Holocaust".

Tim Goodman of The Hollywood Reporter said the LSD trip "was handled brilliantly here, with insight, surprises, unpredictability, excellent humor and a really lovely, smart ending", and the image of Jane and Roger on the floor as an example of the "visual excellence" of the episode.

Time magazine writer Nate Rawlings compared the episode to a David Lynch film and noted that all three "stories also shared the thematic connection of the struggle between professional and work life."

IGN reviewer Eric Goldman praised the performances of John Slattery and Peyton List, and said the episode "took three of the show's best characters and rocked their worlds in very different ways, telling three separate stories that were all utterly involving and moving, and delivering one of the show's best episodes ever in the process. This show continues to operate on a level few other series could dream of ...". Roger Friedman contributing to Forbes called the LSD sequences with Jane and Roger to be "so well-written they were kind of transcendent". Salon writer Nellie Engoron acclaimed the episode, while pointing out that "with this episode's tilt of the seesaw back to the older generation from the flailing youngsters, we're reminded that while the 1960s saw a cultural shift towards youth, like a drunk, no historical change walks a straight line. For all the claims that Don and others have made that the 'kids' increasingly hold the cards, the real truth (if we're telling it) is that older white guys like Bert and Roger never truly lost power, even if they began to hide behind the scenes while fresh young faces took the public glory."

=== Ratings ===
The episode was viewed by 2.6 million viewers on the night of its original airing. It drew 0.9 million viewers in the 18–49 demographic.

=== Awards ===
"Far Away Places" was nominated for two Primetime Emmy Awards, for Outstanding Writing for a Drama Series and Outstanding Single-Camera Picture Editing for a Drama Series.
