= The Doorway =

- Mad Men episodes
- Episode nos.: Season 6 Episodes 1 & 2
- Directed by: Scott Hornbacher
- Written by: Matthew Weiner
- Original air date: April 7, 2013
- Running time: 89 minutes

Guest appearances
- Ray Abruzzo as Jonesy (the doorman); Kerris Dorsey as Sandy

Episode chronology
← Previous "The Phantom"	Next → "Collaborators"
- Mad Men season 6

"The Doorway" is the two-part sixth season premiere of the American television drama series Mad Men. Officially counted as the first two episodes of the season, it figures as the 66th and 67th overall episodes of the series. It was written by series creator and executive producer Matthew Weiner and directed by executive producer Scott Hornbacher. The episodes originally aired back-to-back as a feature-length premier on AMC in the United States on April 7, 2013.

The episode takes place in late December 1967 and on the early morning of January 1, 1968. It received strongly positive reviews from critics.

== Plot ==
=== Part I ===
The episode opens with a point of view shot of "Jonesy" (Ray Abruzzo), the Drapers' doorman, in the throes of a heart attack. Dr. Arnold Rosen, a cardiac surgeon who also lives in the building, attends to him with chest compressions.

Don (Jon Hamm) is lying on a Hawaiian beach reading Dante's Inferno, along with Megan (Jessica Paré). The Drapers are mixing business and pleasure on a trip to the Royal Hawaiian Hotel on an expenses-paid trip from Sheraton, which owns the hotel and is an SCDP client. At a luau, Megan, now a recognizable actress on a TV soap opera, is approached by a middle-aged woman seeking an autograph, with Megan excited at being noticed, while Don is put off. That night, Don, unable to sleep, goes to the hotel bar, and spots a young man completely drunk and face down on the bar. Don encounters another slightly drunk man, who recognizes Don's lighter as an indication that he had served in the US military, and identifies himself as Private Dinkins, a soldier on R&R from a tour in Vietnam. Dinkins reveals that he has been in the midst of his own bachelor party and notes the drunken man is his best man. He invites Don to give away his bride at the ceremony. The next morning after waking up alone, Megan finds Don participating in the ceremony on the beach and takes a photo.

In New York, Betty (January Jones), Sally (Kiernan Shipka), Henry's mother Pauline, and Sandy (Kerris Dorsey) (a 15-year-old whose mother has died and who is staying with the Francises) attend The Nutcracker. On their way home, Betty gets pulled over for reckless driving. Back at home with Henry (Christopher Stanley), Bobby, and Gene, Sandy - who says she is going to Juilliard - shows off her skill at playing the violin, performing the popular Nocturne in E-flat Major, Op. 9, no.2 by Chopin. Later, while in bed, Betty teases Henry about his leering at Sandy while she played the violin, and shocks him by jokingly offering to help him gag and rape the girl.

When Megan and Don return home from their Hawaii trip, Megan asks Jonesy how he's feeling. In a flashback to the event earlier, Don and Megan watch Jonesy collapse from an apparent heart attack. Dr. Rosen begins applying chest compressions, as is shown in the opening shot of the episode, and at Rosen's direction, Don removes Jonesy's jacket, while Megan phones an ambulance. Flashing forward back to the present, Jonesy is apparently healthy and back at work, making jokes about his home life before handing Megan a script delivered to her.

In the middle of the night, Betty gets up to make a snack and finds Sandy in the kitchen, smoking a cigarette and unable to sleep. Sandy reveals that Juilliard rejected her and that what she really wants is just to live in New York City. Betty urges Sandy to wait a few more years, and this sparks an argument between the two. Betty confides her unpleasant experience living in an overcrowded, low-rent Manhattan apartment when she was modelling, while Sandy expresses admiration for people living in a commune in the Village, and says she once visited such a group on St. Mark's Place.

Peggy (Elisabeth Moss), now living with her boyfriend Abe, receives a late-night call from Bert Peterson from Cutler Gleason and Chaough. A comic appearing on The Tonight Show has made jokes about American soldiers in Vietnam cutting off Viet Cong soldiers' ears and wearing them around their necks like trophies, rendering CGC's planned Super Bowl commercial for Koss headphones (featuring the slogan "Lend Me Your Ears") potentially too controversial. Peterson wants Peggy to develop a new ad. Peggy tries unsuccessfully to reach Ted Chaough (Kevin Rahm) in Colorado by phone about the crisis.

Don chats with Dr. Rosen in their building's elevator as they leave for work. Rosen expresses interest in the Leica cameras SCDP is promoting, and Don offers him one free if he stops by Don's office.

Roger Sterling (John Slattery) is now seeing a psychiatrist, and during a session he discusses a new love interest, as well as his feelings that his employees respect him but don't really know or care about him. Roger laments that neither he nor his life's direction seems to be changed by his experiences, and he seems anxious about aging toward death.

While sharing an elevator, Bob Benson (James Wolk), who says he works in accounts on SCDP's second floor, tries his best to make an impression on Don, although Don struggles to remember who Benson is. At the office Don finds the copywriting team (now openly smoking cannabis), hoping for feedback about his trip to inspire a concept for the Royal Hawaiian pitch. Photographers are taking pictures of the partners, and Don finds his office rearranged for that purpose. Now alone in his office, Don stares out the window and hears the ocean.

Don meets with a few of the new copywriters and criticizes their ideas for advertising a Dow oven cleaner; he's particularly concerned with the trivialization of the "love" construct. The receptionist shows Dr. Rosen into the room, but he halts her at the door so he can witness Don at work before he is noticed. Don then retrieves Dr. Rosen his promised Leica M2 model camera while Rosen leers at a passing secretary. The doctor lets Don in on the New Year's Eve plans their wives have been making, sharing that he'd instructed his wife, Sylvia, to "keep it in the building."

As Roger tries to arrange a date with his new girlfriend, his secretary, Caroline, walks into his office visibly upset. She informs Roger that his mother died that morning of a stroke. Although she bursts into tears upon delivering the news, Roger is relatively unfazed as she was 91 years old. He then instructs Caroline to request Joan's (Christina Hendricks) help to make funeral arrangements.

In Don's office, while the photographers are attempting to capture him in his element, he lights up a cigarette and realizes he's still holding onto PFC Dinkins' Zippo lighter, which bears the inscription: "IN LIFE WE OFTEN HAVE TO DO THINGS THAT JUST ARE NOT OUR BAG." When the photographer finally gets the attention of a now-distracted Don, he tells Don, "I want you to be yourself."

=== Part II ===
At home, Megan wakes Don to tell him she's been called in to work today, and for the rest of the week; this will cause her to miss Roger's mother's funeral, which she regrets. When Megan leaves, Don gets out of bed and, again finding Dinkins' lighter, throws it in the garbage. Before leaving for the funeral, he starts drinking while watching TV.

Betty learns from Sally that Sandy has left for Manhattan, despite Betty's wishes. Sandy had told Sally she was going to Juilliard early, which Betty knows is not true.

As Roger mingles with some of his mother's friends at her funeral gathering, his ex-wife Jane arrives and offers Roger his mother's ring back, so he can pass it on to his daughter, Margaret, or bury it with his mother. Roger insists that Jane keep it. Some catered food is delivered that Roger didn't order; it turns out to be from Bob Benson. Don arrives at the funeral drunk. As Roger starts addressing the guests, his first wife Mona (Margaret's mother) shows up along with her current husband, which irritates Roger. At the same time, one of Roger's mother's elderly friends cuts him off and demands to deliver the first eulogy, which Roger obliges. As the woman speaks about Roger's mother's devotion to him, Don vomits into an umbrella stand, so Ken Cosgrove (Aaron Staton), Pete Campbell (Vincent Kartheiser), and Harry Crane (Rich Sommer) escort him out of the room. Before the eulogy can resume, Roger confronts Mona's husband for appearing uninvited, and quickly loses his temper and starts shouting at them. Roger then attempts to kick everybody out, but no one moves, so he storms off.

Mona goes to Roger, who is lying on his mother's bed, covering himself with the guests' fur coats. He tells her she shouldn't have brought her husband; she agrees. He says his mother is dead and he says he doesn't feel anything. Mona replies he seems emotional. Roger says he needs a drink, and Mona responds she knew he loved her, so there's nothing to drink about. She gently prods Roger to spend more time with his daughter Margaret. He sits up and makes a pass at Mona, who laughs him off.

Pete and Ken bring Don home, and he drunkenly asks Jonesy what he saw when he died. Jonesy reports he saw a light and then says he doesn't like to think about it. Don wonders if the light was like hot tropical sunshine and if he heard the ocean.

Betty travels to Greenwich Village looking for Sandy and finally finds the house where she stayed with a bunch of squatters. She is appalled at the condition of the rundown building. She finds Sandy's violin and asks two men in the kitchen about her. They say she was around but haven't seen her lately. The leader of the squatters arrives and says Sandy left for California, with no forwarding address. Betty tries to leave with the violin, but the leader says he bought it from Sandy, who needed bus money, for $10. Betty takes the violin anyway, before she changes her mind and leaves it in the front hall before leaving.

Back at the Sterling house, Margaret chats with Roger. He gives her a jar of discolored water from the River Jordan that his mother kept and used to baptize all the family members. Margaret wonders if her grandmother left her anything else. It turns out her husband Brooks wants to make an investment in the refrigeration business. Roger tells her to have him sit down with him and present a written business proposal. She is thrilled, but leaves the jar of water behind.

Megan finds a hungover Don in bed, where she left him earlier, and reports that her character "pushed Derek's mother down the stairs" on the soap opera. She further says that the staff are making her character into a "lying, cheating whore", and she is thrilled because it means her part will be bigger. Don assures Megan that being the antagonist on the show will likely make her even more popular. She asks if he will still love her if she's a "lying, cheating whore". He says he will, but will walk behind her on the stairs. She also gives back the lighter, which the maid found in the garbage.

Later on New Year's Eve, Peggy is working, and Abe brings her a choice of sandwiches. She asks him to try the client's headphones and think of a way to describe them. Her staff comes in with new lines for the ad, to replace the original "lend me your ears" reference. They say they have three ideas and read her three lines. She asks for other ideas, pointing out that they gave her three versions of the same idea, and if they can't figure out which part is the idea and which part is the execution of the idea, then they are of no use to her. She notices Abe enraptured by the music on the headphones and moving to the beat, and gets inspired.

Don arrives in the office for the presentation to Sheraton. He gives Dawn the lighter and asks her to find a way to get it back to Dinkins.

Roger, back in therapy, is talking about his ex-wife and daughter. He talks about his mother and says she gave him his last new experience; now it's just a slow march to death. The therapist says Roger feels lost; Roger replies he doesn't feel anything.

Ken says hello to Bob, who is loitering in the lobby. He shames him for sending food to Roger's mother's funeral, and for using a funeral as an opportunity to gain Roger's attention. He tells Bob to go back to his office and do some work, or otherwise people will think he has nothing to do.

At the first meeting with the Sheraton people, Don shows them the ad: a drawing of shoes, a suit jacket, and a tie with footprints next to it leading into the ocean. He says they're not selling a geographical location but an experience. He waxes poetic about the air and the water at the resort, and how the place put him in a state. The tagline is: "Hawaii. The jumping off point." To the executives, however, it looks like the man in the ad committed suicide à la A Star Is Born. Don is confused that they are reading it that way. The executives wonder where the hotel is and that the ad is a little morbid because it could make people think of suicide.

Betty comes home on New Year's Eve as a dark brunette. Bobby and Sally mock her, while Henry pretends to confuse her for Elizabeth Taylor.

Caroline informs Roger that the man who shines his shoes has died. The man's family sent over his shoeshine kit as Roger was the only one who asked about him. Roger takes the kit into his office and opens it. When he takes out a brush, he starts uncontrollably sobbing.

On New Year's Eve, the Drapers are entertaining the Rosens and another couple from their building. The other couple relays a story about a man from his office who got caught in a men's room stall at Bloomingdale's with another man, suggesting that it was not an isolated incident. Megan goads Don into showing slides from their Hawaiian trip. While doing so, he lingers on the photo Megan took of the Dinkins' wedding.

Later on New Year's Eve, Peggy chats with Stan over the phone as they both work. They gossip about Roger and Joan. Ted then comes in to talk to Peggy. She explains she may have found a solution. She shows him outtakes of the ad with the actor in the toga clowning around while wearing the headphones. She says she envisions a voiceover: "Koss headphones: sound so sharp and clear you can actually see it." He loves it and tells her she's good in a crisis and to let the workers go home. Stan, who had been listening over the phone, comments that he thinks Ted likes her.

Later in the night, the other couple has left the Drapers'. The Rosens and Drapers had such a good time they missed midnight. Just then, Dr. Rosen gets a call for emergency surgery. The snowstorm outside makes a cab unlikely, so Don and Arnold Rosen head down to the building's storage room to get Rosen's skis. Don asks him what it's like to have a life in his hands; Arnold replies it's a privilege and an honor to have the responsibility. He says Don gets paid to think about things people don't want to think about, and he gets paid not to think about them, before heading off on his skis. Don heads back in and promptly goes to bed with Arnold's wife, Sylvia (Linda Cardellini), who had given him Dante's Inferno to read while in Hawaii. She asks what he wants for the new year, to which he replies that he wants to stop what they are doing.

Don goes home and picks up the newspaper. It is 1968. He gets into bed with Megan, who kisses him and wishes him a happy new year.

== Cultural references ==
=== Dante's Inferno ===
Allusions to Dante's Inferno are abundant throughout the episode, including Don's reading the book while lying on Waikiki Beach, next to Megan. Writes Chicago Sun-Times critic Lori Rackl: "The episode is permeated with the first installment of the Italian poet's "Divine Comedy," a three-part allegorical journey through the afterlife. Don is a '60s version of Dante, trapped in the depths of hell, searching for his Virgil to guide him along the virtuous path that leads to eternal paradise."

Rackl further observes, Don opens the scene by reading "a line from Dante's allegorical tale: 'Midway in our life's journey, I went astray from the straight road and woke to find myself alone in a dark wood,' he says." She continues: "This opener dovetails with the season five finale, when a tempting female stranger in a dark bar asks Don that pivotal question: 'Are you alone?'"

Some critics have noted the episode is structured around Don's sinful progression through the nine circles of hell. WSJ.com's Evangeline Morphos shares: "I'm afraid—and thrilled—that this season will take us further into the rings of hell."

== Production ==
"The Doorway"—a double-length episode which serves as the first two episodes of the season—was written by series creator and showrunner Matthew Weiner and directed by executive producer Scott Hornbacher. Principal photography for the episode began in October 2012, with Jon Hamm and Jessica Paré filming scenes in Hawaii. Weiner said of the premiere's structure: "it's really constructed like a film. It is its own story and hopefully it foreshadows the rest of the season."

== Reception ==
=== Critical response ===
The episode was very well received by critics. Alan Sepinwall of HitFix called the premiere "thoughtful, moving and gorgeous in that 'Mad Men' way." Lori Rackl of the Chicago Sun-Times wrote: "Packed with symbolism and cryptic, thought-provoking fodder, the sublime two-hour episode could be the subject of a college course. Emily St. James of The A.V. Club graded the double episode "A−" and observed: "This is still one of TV's best shows, still moving confidently and at the height of its powers, filled with great characters and terrific storytelling. It's been on the air long enough now to have a rich, complicated history of its own, and watching it all spool out—both as it happened and in the changed visages of the characters—continues to be one of TV's chief pleasures. And always there are those objects and items, ghosts and totems of lives that once were. A cigarette lighter. A piece of office decoration that reminds one of sadly departed Lane. A copy of Dante's Inferno. A set of skis. A seemingly non-descript Mason jar. Mad Men has always been about the relentless march of history, about the way that time waits for no man. Increasingly, though, it's taking advantage of its own history, something that gives it a richness and depth most shows on TV barely even aspire to. And at its center are some of the greatest characters in TV history."

Critics also noted, however, the darkening nature of the show. For example, Michael Hogan of The Huffington Post observed early on in his episode review: "Man, that was one saddening episode of "Mad Men". He closed with: "Instead of alleviating our anxiety, 'Mad Men' dares to depict it, give it shape, rub our faces in it. We can't help loving Don and Roger, but look at what they do. Look at how they live. They're monsters. And they look an awful lot like us."

=== Ratings ===
The original broadcast on April 7, 2013, was watched by an estimated 3.4 million viewers. The episode was down in viewership from the fifth-season premiere, which received 3.5 million viewers, but increased in viewership from the fifth-season finale, which attained 2.7 million viewers.

== See also ==
- Tiger Force
