= Nixon vs. Kennedy (Mad Men) =

- Mad Men episode
- Episode no.: Season 1 Episode 12
- Directed by: Alan Taylor
- Written by: Lisa Albert; Maria Jacquemetton; Andre Jacquemetton
- Original air date: October 11, 2007
- Running time: 48 minutes

Guest appearances
- Robert Morse as Bert Cooper; Alison Brie as Trudy Campbell; Mark Moses as Herman "Duck" Phillips; Troy Ruptash as Lieutenant Donald Draper

Episode chronology
← Previous "Indian Summer"	Next → "The Wheel"
- Mad Men season 1

"Nixon vs. Kennedy" is the twelfth episode of the first season of American television series Mad Men. Written by Lisa Albert and the Jacquemettons (Maria Jacquemetton and Andre Jacquemetton) and directed by Alan Taylor, the episode first aired on AMC on October 11, 2007, in the United States. In the episode, Sterling Cooper employees party after hours, a new man is hired, and the audience gains more insight into Don Draper's past.

== Plot ==
After Sterling Cooper's partners leave the office for the night, the staff commence a viewing for the 1960 United States presidential election, with Nixon in the lead over Kennedy. The viewing, however, becomes dominated by widespread drinking and partying. Ken discovers a play written by Paul, leading to the staff acting it and concluding with Sal and Joan sharing a kiss and Harry having a drunken affair with Pete's secretary, Hildy. The following morning, the office is in disarray, and Peggy finds money she kept in her locker missing: she reports this to building security.

Before the party, Pete lobbies an unwilling Don to promote him to head of accounts instead of the external candidate Duck Phillips. At home that night, Pete digs through Don's box of childhood memories, but draws ire from his wife for being secretive. The following day, Pete approaches Don and when he again refuses to consider Pete for head of accounts, Pete threatens to use the box's information against Don. Don has a short flashback to the Korean War when he views the box's contents, revealing that, in 1950, Dick Whitman met Lt. Donald Draper, an engineer and Dick's sole companion at a new encampment. The ensuing distress leads Don to run to Rachel and ask her to run away with him, but she promptly ends their affair.

Don returns to the office and finds Peggy crying, upset that two low-ranking building staff member not present the previous night were fired following her report, and that the office lacks fairness and accountability. Don and Pete race to Bert Cooper's office: Don informs Bert he will hire Duck, and Pete tells him Don's real name and that he suspects him of faking his death and being a deserter. Bert acts uninterested, noting Don's dedication and value to the company. After Pete leaves, Bert gives Don permission to fire Pete, but also encourages Don to "keep an eye on him".

Don then has another flashback. During the war, Dick and Donald are attacked, but survive by hiding in their trench. Dick accidentally causes a fuel tanker to explode, killing Donald. Dick, although wounded, switches dog tags with the disfigured Donald, allowing him to assume his identity. Dick is awarded a Purple Heart and Donald's body is returned to Dick's family. Adam spots Dick on a nearby train, but Dick remains on the train as it departs. In the present, Don enters his living room to watch Nixon's concession of the election.

== Production ==
"Nixon vs. Kennedy" was written by Lisa Albert, Andre Jacquemetton, and Maria Jacquemetton, and directed by Alan Taylor. The episode was shot in Los Angeles, California, and its production budget ranged between 2-2.5 million dollars.

Director Alan Taylor noted that the office party reflected the celebration of the show being greenlit and the pilot actors returning as full-time cast members. The production staff had the show's actors "hanging out" in the background when they lacked lines to make the party feel more authentic. Taylor also notes the comparisons between the workplace power struggle and the election between Nixon and Kennedy. When Don tells Pete off in Pete's office, Kennedy is on the television in the background. This was done intentionally, as Don's remarks about Pete reflect "what Nixon would say about Kennedy". Additionally, Jon Hamm broke his hand during the rehearsal for the explosion scene: as this was one of the first scenes filmed for the episode, his right hand is not in view for most of the episode's other scenes.

Songs featured in the episode include "A Beautiful Mine" by Aceyalone, "Moonglow" by Benny Goodman, and "The End of the World" by Skeeter Davis.

== First appearances ==
- Herman "Duck" Phillips: the new head of accounts at Sterling Cooper.
- Lt. Donald Draper: a lieutenant in the Korean War and Dick Whitman's superior.

== Deceased ==
- Lt. Draper: killed in an explosion. Dick subsequently stole his identity and became the Don Draper of Sterling Cooper.

== Reception ==
The AV Club regarded the episode as one of the "finest hours" of the first season, delivering particular praise for the scene wherein Pete reveals Don's secret to Bert Cooper. Vulture lauded the episode for being "fully loaded", highlighting the episode's comparison of Don and Pete's power struggle to the presidential election. Vulture additionally praised the episode for serving as a strong companion to the season finale, stating that both episodes "feel like halves of the same novella or movie".

"Nixon vs. Kennedy" received a nomination for Outstanding Prosthetic Makeup for a Series, Miniseries, Movie or Special at the 2008 Primetime Creative Arts Emmy Awards. The episode was also ranked in the top 10 of the 2009 TV Guide's 100 Greatest Episodes of All Time.
