= Shut the Door. Have a Seat. =

- Mad Men episode
- The newly formed Sterling Cooper Draper Pryce advertising agency at The Pierre
- Episode no.: Season 3 Episode 13
- Directed by: Matthew Weiner
- Written by: Matthew Weiner; Erin Levy
- Original air date: November 8, 2009
- Running time: 48 minutes

Guest appearances
- Jared Harris as Lane Pryce; Christopher Stanley as Henry Francis; Chelcie Ross as Conrad "Connie" Hilton; Ryan Cartwright as John Hooker; Charles Shaughnessy as Saint John Powell; Joseph Culp as Archibald "Archie" Whitman; Patrick Cavanaugh as Smitty Smith; John Patrick McCormack as Kenneth Dillon

Episode chronology
← Previous "The Grown-Ups"	Next → "Public Relations"
- Mad Men season 3

"Shut the Door. Have a Seat." is the thirteenth and final episode of the third season of the American television drama series Mad Men, and the 39th overall episode of the series. The episode was written by series creator and executive producer Matthew Weiner and Erin Levy, and directed by Weiner. It originally aired on the AMC channel in the United States on November 8, 2009. The title refers to a line that is spoken once in the episode verbatim, but more generally to similar phrases that are spoken to various characters throughout, "and they sit and hear some life-changing bit of news".

"Shut the Door. Have a Seat." aired to widespread acclaim from television critics and has appeared on many publications' lists of the show's greatest episodes.

== Plot ==
Don Draper (Jon Hamm) is informed by Conrad Hilton (Chelcie Ross) that McCann Erickson is buying Puttnam, Powell, and Lowe, and thereby also Sterling Cooper. Hilton does not wish to do business with McCann and so plans to sever his relationship with Don, who feels betrayed and trapped (since it was Hilton who pressured him into signing a contract); Hilton is unsympathetic and tells him to take control of his own fate.

Don approaches Bertram Cooper (Robert Morse) and, expressing a desire to build something of his own and maintain independence, suggests trying to buy Sterling Cooper back from PPL. In need of capital, they approach Roger Sterling (John Slattery), since he controls the lucrative account Lucky Strike. Roger initially rejects the idea, still indignant at Don and Bert's disapproval of his marrying Jane, until Don admits his own professional faults and acknowledges Roger's talents as an account man, repairing their friendship.

Betty (January Jones) tells Don she has hired a lawyer and is preparing to file for divorce. Don remains dismissive, suggesting Betty see a psychiatrist again, but Betty is determined. She and Henry Francis (Christopher Stanley) meet with a divorce attorney, who suggests she go to Reno, Nevada to obtain a divorce. While Betty wants "what's [hers]" in the divorce, Henry insists that he can take care of her and the children and tells her not to ask Don for anything.

Don, Bert and Roger meet with Lane Pryce (Jared Harris) about buying the company back from PPL, but he tells them it's now worth more than they're offering, thanks to his efforts, and that PPL has not been sold, though they are selling Sterling Cooper. Lane later discovers PPL has in fact been sold and his employers are cutting him loose. Armed with this knowledge, Don suggests that Lane, as managing partner, fire himself, Cooper, and Sterling, thus voiding their contracts (and their non-compete clauses) and, once he is fired for this action, join them in starting a new agency. Lane agrees and takes advantage of the time difference between New York and London to put their plan into action, which gives them the weekend to acquire as many accounts as possible.

Don immediately tells Peggy Olson (Elisabeth Moss) about the plan and to prepare to leave with him, but Peggy, offended by his presumption, refuses to leave. Don and Roger visit Pete, who has called in sick so he could interview with a rival agency. Knowing he feels unappreciated, they acknowledge his forward thinking and offer him a junior partnership, which he agrees to. Don then goes to see Peggy at her apartment and finally acknowledges her talents, telling her that if she doesn't come to the new agency, he will spend the rest of his life trying to hire her. Peggy agrees.

When Pete arrives at Sterling Cooper over the weekend, he encounters a clueless Harry Crane (Rich Sommer), who is soon coerced into joining the new agency. Roger brings Joan Harris (Christina Hendricks) aboard as well to ensure they leave with all necessary client files for continuity of service. The group raids the Sterling Cooper offices and leaves late at night.

Don finds out about Betty's relationship with Henry from Roger, and angrily confronts her. She tells him plainly that she's going to Reno to divorce him and he's going to consent, implicitly threatening to reveal his secret identity if he does not. The next day, Don and Betty break the news to their children that they are divorcing. Sally storms out, feeling betrayed, and Bobby begs his father not to go.

The members of the new agency meet in a hotel room at The Pierre. Don calls Betty and agrees to consent to the divorce, and she replies "You will always be their father." That evening, Betty leaves for Reno with Henry and her infant son, Gene, leaving Sally and Bobby in the care of their housekeeper Carla, while Don arrives alone at his new apartment in downtown Manhattan.

== Production ==
Series creator and executive producer Matthew Weiner wrote "Shut the Door. Have a Seat." together with Erin Levy, and also directed the episode. In an interview he did with The Daily Beast, released the same day the episode aired, Weiner revealed some of his thoughts behind it, and his vision for the season as a whole. Weiner revealed that the problems associated with the firm's new ownership, and Don eventually finding a way to liberate himself, were ideas he had from the beginning of the season. He wanted to highlight "the corporate nonsense that is unrelated to work", adding that "[Getting rid of Sterling Cooper] was very scary but I knew in my heart it was what I had to do." As for the relationship between Don and Betty, he was very clear that the break was final. "It's so unambiguous to me that this marriage is over," he said, "but the audience seems to cling to the idea that they should be together because we want to believe in those things."

In connection with the release of the episode, AMC did interviews with two of the actors portraying more peripheral characters on the show: Chelcie Ross, who played Conrad Hilton, and Joseph Culp, who interpreted the role of Dick/Don's father, Archie Whitman. Ross revealed that he had not known that his character was a historical character when first auditioning for the part; it was only after he had been cast that he was told he was to play Conrad Hilton. For preparation, he said he "did a little Internet research and Matt provided me with the Time magazine article". Culp, in his interview, talked about the makeup he wore for the death scene. Even though the shot of his head after the accident was brief, the makeup was very realistic, and made a great impression on those present at the set.

== Reception ==
The episode had a viewership of 2.323 million. This was the highest number of viewers for any episode of the show that season, since the premiere. While the numbers were good for the show, TV by the Numbers' Robert Seidman pointed out that the viewers were generally older than the 18–49 demographic coveted by advertisers. Only 1.118 million, or slightly less than half the viewers, belonged to this demographic.

=== Critical reception ===
"Shut the Door. Have a Seat." was met with highly favorable reviews from critics, with several reviewers giving the episode top score on their rating system and calling it one of the best in the series. It has appeared on many publications' lists of the show's greatest episodes. Keith Phipps of The A.V. Club gave the episode an "A", calling it "quite thrilling". Phipps was pleasantly surprised by the "dawn of a new era" that seemed to be implied, as opposed to the "bleak ending" he had expected. San Francisco Chronicle's Tim Goodman also appreciated the "giddy abandon" of the episode, and called it "arguably the best melding of plot-movement and existential crisis exploration of the entire season." TV critic Alan Sepinwall called the episode "a concentrated shot of pure storytelling joy". Sepinwall commended actors Jared Harris, whose Lane character he was glad to see remaining on the show, and John Slattery, for his comedic timing. In a review for IGN, Eric Goldman called the episode "simply excellent". Goldman, like Phipps, was pleasantly surprised by how his dark forebodings at the start of the episode were false, and that things came together for the best.

Reviewers commented on the plot's similarity to the archetypal heist film, several mentioning specifically Ocean's Eleven. Sepinwall enjoyed particularly what he referred to as his "favorite part of any caper (or other kind of ensemble adventure) movie: the gathering of the team." Slate's Patrick Radden Keefe also mentioned Seven Samurai, adding that, though the concept is not a new one, "I tend to enjoy these types of sequences...[a]nd in this instance, the fact that the team members were being poached from inside Sterling Coop made it all the more fun."
