= Gloria Pasqua-Casny =

American hairstylist

- Born: Gloria Pasqua; 1952 (age 73–74)
- Occupation: Hairstylist
- Years active: 1991–present
- Spouse: Christian (Chris) Casny (m. 1995)

Gloria Pasqua-Casny (née Pasqua; born 1952) is an American hairstylist. Along with makeup artist Joel Harlow, she was nominated for an Academy Award for Best Makeup and Hairstyling for the 2013 film The Lone Ranger at the 86th Academy Awards.
