= Blake McCormick =

Television producer

- Born: 10/22/1964; Mount Kisco, NY
- Occupation: Television producer
- Writing career
- Notable work: Mad Men

Blake McCormick is a television producer. He has worked on the AMC drama series Mad Men and was nominated for a PGA Award for his work on the show.

== Biography ==
McCormick joined the crew of Mad Men as a co-producer for the first season in 2007. He returned to this role for the second season in 2008. He was promoted to producer for the third season in 2009. He remained a producer for the fourth season in 2010. McCormick and the production staff were nominated for the 2011 PGA Award for Television Producer of the Year Award in Episodic for their work on the fourth season.

== Awards and nominations ==
- 2011 PGA Award for Television Producer of the Year Award in Episodic for Mad Men season 4
