= Dwayne Shattuck =

- Born: June 1, 1959 (age 67); Atlanta, Georgia
- Occupation: Television producer
- Writing career
- Notable work: Mad Men

Dwayne Shattuck (born June 1, 1959 in Atlanta, Georgia, USA) is a television producer. He has worked for four seasons on the AMC drama series Mad Men.

== Biography ==
He produced the first season of the new period drama "Magic City" for Starz Network. Dwayne has also worked for four seasons as a Producer on the AMC drama series "Mad Men," as well as "Push Nevada" and "Skin" for producers Jerry Bruckheimer, Ben Affleck, and Sean Bailey. Dwayne started in the film industry as a set medic, and has worked as an Assistant Director, Production Manager, and then as a Producer. Dwayne lives in Los Angeles with his wife, Nicole (a still photographer) and his two sons. He is the cousin of Alexandria, Catharine, and Matthew Daddario.

== Awards and nominations ==
- 2010 DGA Award for Outstanding Directorial Achievement in Dramatic Series Night for Mad Men episode "Guy Walks Into An Advertising Agency"
- 2010 Winner Golden Globe Award for producing "Mad Men"
- 2010 Winner Emmy Award for producing "Mad Men"
- 2011 DGA Nominations for producing "Mad Men"
- 2011 Golden Globe Nomination for producing "Mad Men"
- 2011 PGA Award for Television Producer of the Year Award in Episodic for Mad Men season 4
- 2011 Winner Emmy Award for producing "Mad Men"
- 2011 Winner AFI Producer of The Year Award for producing "Mad Men"
- 2012 PGA Award Nomination for producing "Mad Men"
