= Erin Levy =

American television writer

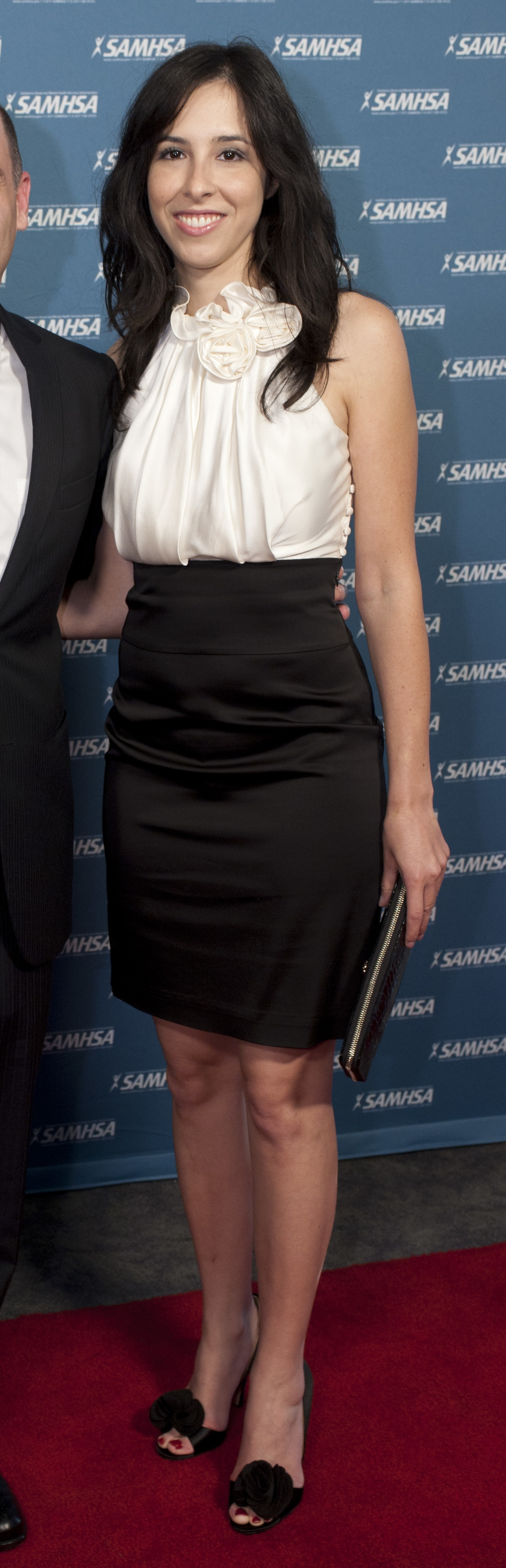
- Erin Levy in 2011
- Born: United States
- Occupation: Television Writer
- Parent: Lawrence H. Levy (father)
- Writing career
- Notable work: Mad Men

Erin Levy is an American television writer. She has worked on the AMC drama Mad Men and has won an Emmy Award and a Writers Guild of America (WGA) Award.

== Biography ==
Daughter of television writer Lawrence H. Levy, Erin Levy took a screenwriting seminar at USC in high school, which sparked her interest in following in her father's footsteps.

Levy attended USC undergraduate for screenwriting, where one of her professors was Matthew Weiner. The two kept in touch, and when Weiner needed a writing assistant, Levy joined the crew of AMC drama Mad Men as a writing assistant for the third season in 2009. The first episode she co-wrote was the season finale, "Shut the Door. Have a Seat." Levy and the writing staff won the Writers Guild of America (WGA) Award for Best Drama Series at the February 2010 ceremony for their work on the third season.

"The Chrysanthemum and the Sword" is her first episode where she is given solo writing credit.

In 2010, she and the rest of the writing staff won an Emmy Award for her writing in the AMC drama Mad Men.

She is credited as a writer for the 2017-2019 Starz series Counterpart.
