= Janet Leahy =

American television writer and producer

- Occupations: Television executive producer and writer
- Writing career
- Notable work: Mad Men

Janet Leahy is an American television executive producer and writer, whose name is often associated with prestige television. She has worked in both capacities on the AMC drama series Mad Men and won a WGA Award for her work on the show.

== Biography ==
Leahy joined the crew of Mad Men as a consulting producer for the fourth season in 2010. She co-wrote the episode "The Summer Man" with series creator and executive producer Matthew Weiner and consulting producer Lisa Albert. Leahy and the writing staff won the WGA Award for Best Drama Series for their work on the fourth season. Some of Leahy's other television credits include The Cosby Show, Cheers, Roseanne, Boston Legal, Wings, Newhart and Gilmore Girls.

== Awards and nominations ==
- 1987 Emmy Award for Outstanding Writing in a Comedy Series for Cheers

*2007 Emmy Award for Outstanding Drama Series for Boston Legal

- 2011 WGA Award for Best Drama Series for Mad Men
