= Person to Person (Mad Men) =

- Mad Men episode
- Episode no.: Season 7 Episode 14
- Directed by: Matthew Weiner
- Written by: Matthew Weiner
- Original air date: May 17, 2015
- Running time: 57 minutes

Guest appearances
- Alison Brie as Trudy Campbell; Julia Ormond as Marie Calvet; Bruce Greenwood as Richard; Caity Lotz as Stephanie; Christine Estabrook as Gail Holloway; Amy Ferguson as Maureen; Fiona Gubelmann as Eve; Spencer Treat Clark as Kelly; Anna Osceola as Clementine; Brett Gelman as Daniel; Jeffrey Vincent Parise as Vince; Helen Slater as Sheila; Evan Arnold as Leonard

Episode chronology
← Previous "The Milk and Honey Route"	Next → —
- Mad Men season 7

"Person to Person" is the series finale of the American drama television series Mad Men. It is the fourteenth episode of the seventh season and the 92nd episode overall. The episode was written and directed by series creator Matthew Weiner, and originally aired on AMC on May 17, 2015. The finale received critical acclaim and in the years following its airing, it has been cited as one of the greatest television finales ever made.

== Plot ==
In the fall of 1970, Don calls Sally from Utah. Sally tells Don about Betty's cancer diagnosis. She believes Bobby and Gene should stay with Henry Francis after Betty dies. Don implores Betty to have his children live with him; Betty wants them to live with her brother and his wife, stating they need stability that Don cannot provide. In California, Don reunites with Anna Draper's niece Stephanie, who has left her child to be raised with his paternal grandmother. She leaves for an oceanside spiritual retreat, bringing Don with her.

Joan receives a business opportunity from Ken Cosgrove, and offers Peggy a partnership in her new film production company. Peggy discusses it with Stan, who tells her that her current job is a better fit, which leads to them arguing. Richard is displeased with Joan's professional ambition and leaves her. Later, Roger visits and tells Joan that his daughter Margaret is now "lost"; he is going to leave his estate to his grandson and Kevin. Roger also intends to marry Marie Calvet.

Sally returns home from boarding school. Bobby reveals he knows about Betty's cancer, and that Sally has returned to take care of him and Gene.

Stephanie abandons Don after being criticized in group therapy for abandoning her child. Don calls Peggy, who pleads for him to return, insisting McCann Erickson would rehire him. In despair, Don confesses many of his wrongdoings to Peggy before ending the call.

Peggy phones Stan to discuss Don's call. Though Peggy is concerned for Don, Stan notes that he has disappeared before and returned. She apologizes for their argument, and Stan tells her he loves her. Peggy realizes she loves him too. He rushes to her office, where they kiss.

A counselor at the retreat persuades Don to attend group therapy. Another attendee confesses to feeling unloved and overlooked by his family and colleagues. As he breaks down crying, Don, overcome with emotion, embraces him.

External video
- "The Final Scene of Mad Men" on the official AMC+ YouTube channel

Pete, Trudy and Tammy board a Learjet to Wichita. Joan operates her new business from her apartment. Roger and Marie sit in a cafe in Paris. Sally tends to her brothers while Betty smokes a cigarette and reads. While working, Peggy is embraced by Stan. Don meditates at the retreat; he smiles and the 1971 "Hilltop" television advertisement for Coca-Cola is shown.

== Reception ==
=== Ratings ===
The episode was watched by 3.287 million viewers in its original American broadcast and received a 1.1 rating in the 18–49 demographics.

=== Critical reception ===
The finale received a 92% rating at Rotten Tomatoes with an average score of 8.7 out of 10 based on 52 reviews. The site's consensus reads, "'Person to Person' shoulders the burden of concluding a masterpiece by avoiding predictability while still offering a sweet sendoff for most of Mad Men's main characters." The episode, however, also inspired diverse reactions from critics.

Maureen Ryan of The Huffington Post felt that "some past season finales were more satisfying and resonant than the series finale was" but felt the ending for Stan and Peggy was great. Alan Sepinwall of HitFix felt the Stan and Peggy aspect, while "as sappy and wish-fullfillment-y as Mad Men has ever gotten", was "a fair way to end things" for her character. At the same time he expressed concern that Don's ending might well be "a very cynical and dark take on a man I wanted better from." Although Megan Garber of The Atlantic found Don's ending "a pleasant shock". John Teti of The A.V. Club gave the episode a perfect "A" grade.

Evan Arnold's brief role as Leonard and his "refrigerator" speech also received notice and praise.

=== Ending interpretation ===
The series finale ends with Don Draper meditating on a hilltop and cuts to the iconic 1971 "Hilltop" television advertisement for Coca-Cola, which leaves viewers to interpret whether Don created the ad. In real life, the ad was created by Bill Backer of McCann Erickson — the agency for which Don works at the time of the finale.

Many critics interpret the ending as the commercial having been created by Don, as does actor Jon Hamm. Both McCann Erickson and Coca-Cola interpret that Don created the ad. Critics also have noted similarities between the woman working at the commune where Don stays in the finale and a woman in the Coke commercial. Other critics argue writer-creator Matthew Weiner left it deliberately ambiguous.

Series creator and episode writer Matthew Weiner said in an interview after the finale:

I did hear rumblings of people talking about the ad being corny. And it's a little bit disturbing to me, getting back to this sort of cynicism, I'm not saying that advertising's not corny, but I'm saying that the people who find that ad corny are kind of — they're probably experiencing a lot of life that way and they're missing out on something ... and the idea that some enlightened state and not just cooption might have created something that is very pure. [...] In the abstract, I did think, like, y'know, why not end this show with the greatest commercial ever made? Y'know? But in terms of what it means to people and everything, I am, again, not for ambiguity for ambiguity's sake. But it was nice to sort of have your cake and eat it too, in terms of what is advertising, who is Don and what is that thing?

Weiner also said of the ending: "We leave everybody slightly improved."

=== Accolades ===
Both Jon Hamm and Elisabeth Moss submitted this episode in consideration for their nominations for Outstanding Lead Actor and Outstanding Lead Actress in a Drama Series, respectively, at the 67th Primetime Emmy Awards. Ultimately, Hamm won the Emmy after being nominated eight consecutive times without a win.

Year	Award	Category	Recipient(s)	Result	Ref.
2015	Primetime Emmy Awards	Outstanding Writing for a Drama Series	Matthew Weiner	Nominated	
2015	Primetime Creative Arts Emmy Awards	Outstanding Hairstyling for a Single-Camera Series	Theraesa Rivers, Arturo Rojas, Valerie Jackson, and Ai Nakata	Nominated	
2015	Primetime Creative Arts Emmy Awards	Outstanding Makeup for a Single-Camera Series (Non-Prosthetic)	Lana Horochowski, Ron Pipes, Maurine Burke, and Jennifer Greenberg	Nominated	
2015	Primetime Creative Arts Emmy Awards	Outstanding Production Design for a Narrative Period Program (One Hour or More)	Dan Bishop, Shanna Starzyk, and Claudette Didul	Nominated	
2015	Primetime Creative Arts Emmy Awards	Outstanding Single-Camera Picture Editing for a Drama Series	Tom Wilson	Nominated	
2016	ACE Eddie Awards	Best Edited One-Hour Series for Commercial Television	Tom Wilson	Won	
2016	Art Directors Guild Awards	One-Hour Period or Fantasy Single-Camera Series	Dan Bishop	Nominated	
2016	Directors Guild of America Awards	Outstanding Directorial Achievement in Dramatic Series	Matthew Weiner	Nominated	
2016	Writers Guild of America Awards	Episodic Drama	Matthew Weiner	Nominated	
