= Lisa Albert =

American television writer and producer

- Born: New York City, New York
- Occupations: Television producer and writer
- Writing career
- Notable work: Mad Men

Lisa Albert is an American television writer and producer. She was born in New York City, and is currently based out of Los Angeles, California. Albert originally began working in publishing until she switched to television writing in 1986. She worked on the AMC drama series Mad Men as a writer and producer and won a Writers Guild of America Award for her work on the show.

== Early life ==
Lisa Albert graduated from Swarthmore College in 1981. She was an honors graduate in English Literature.

== Career ==
Albert served as a producer for the first season of Mad Men and co-wrote two episodes of the season. Alongside her colleagues on the writing staff, she won a Writers Guild of America Award for Best New Series and was nominated for Best Dramatic Series at the February 2008 ceremony for her work on the season.

She returned as a supervising producer for the second season and continued to write episodes. She was nominated for the WGA award for Best Dramatic Series a second time at the February 2009 ceremony for her work on the second season.

After being nominated for the third consecutive year, Albert won the WGA Award for Best Drama Series at the February 2010 ceremony for her work on the third season.

Albert's work on Mad Men was recognized through an award from Peabody, three Emmy Awards, and four Writers Guild of America Awards.

In 2007, Albert and her fellow producers, Tom Palmer, Scott Hornbacher, Matthew Weiner, Kater Gordon, Robin Veith, and Maria and Andre Jacquemetton, collectively accepted an Emmy for the show's pilot episode and received a nomination for their episode, "The Wheel".

In an interview at the Screenwriters' Festival, Albert said that despite the sexism of the era in which the show was set, she hoped viewers would see its feminist qualities. Albert credited her and her coworkers' success to the complexity of their script. She and her fellow female writers have been known to meet together in Albert's home, spending time drawing from their own experiences as women to enhance the complexity with which they drafted the female characters on the show.

Some of her other television writing credits include The Cosby Show, My Sister Sam, Mr. Belvedere, Major Dad, Murphy Brown, Living Single, Suddenly Susan, Hannah Montana, Soul Man, Beautiful People, and Halt and Catch Fire.
