= Scott Hornbacher =

American television producer and director

- Occupation: Television producer
- Writing career
- Notable work: Mad Men

Scott Hornbacher is an American television producer and director. He has worked in both capacities on the AMC drama series Mad Men. He shared the Primetime Emmy Award for Best Drama Series with the production team when they won in 2008 and 2009.

== Biography ==
Hornbacher began his career as a production assistant for films in the 1980s. He became a location manager for films in the 1990s.

In 2000 he began working in television as an assistant unit production manager for the second season of HBO drama The Sopranos. He was promoted to unit production manager for the third season in 2001. In 2002 he joined the production staff in the junior role of associate producer for the fourth season. He remained the show's unit production manager. He was promoted to co-producer for the fifth season in 2004. He remained a co-producer and unit production manager for the first part of the sixth season in 2006. He did not return for the second part of the sixth season in 2007. On The Sopranos Hornbacher worked alongside writer / producer Matthew Weiner.

Weiner went on to create the AMC drama series Mad Men. He hired Hornbacher as a producer and unit production manager for the pilot episode "Smoke Gets in Your Eyes" in 2007. Following the pilot Hornbacher became the on set producer for the first season. He was promoted to co-executive producer for the second season in 2008. He was promoted to executive producer for the third season in 2009. He made his directorial debut with the season's ninth episode "Wee Small Hours". He remained an executive producer for the fourth season in 2010. He directed the season's fifth episode "Waldorf Stories".

Hornbacher and Weiner also collaborated on the 2014 movie Are You Here.
