= Halt and Catch Fire (TV series) =

American period drama television series

- Genre: Period drama
- Created by: Christopher Cantwell; Christopher C. Rogers
- Showrunners: Jonathan Lisco; Christopher Cantwell; Christopher C. Rogers
- Starring: Lee Pace; Scoot McNairy; Mackenzie Davis; Kerry Bishé; Toby Huss; Aleksa Palladino
- Theme music composer: Trentemøller
- Composer: Paul Haslinger
- Country of origin: United States
- Original language: English
- No. of seasons: 4
- No. of episodes: 40 (list of episodes)

Production
- Executive producers: Christopher Cantwell; Christopher C. Rogers; Jonathan Lisco; Mark Johnson; Melissa Bernstein
- Production location: Atlanta, Georgia
- Cinematography: Evans Brown; Nelson Cragg; Jeffrey Jur
- Camera setup: Single-camera
- Running time: 41–54 minutes
- Production companies: AMC Studios; Gran Via Productions; Lockjaw Productions; 320 Sycamore; Sic Semper Tyrannis

Original release
- Network: AMC
- Release: June 1, 2014 – October 14, 2017

Halt and Catch Fire is an American period drama television series created by Christopher Cantwell and Christopher C. Rogers. It aired on the cable network AMC in the United States from June 1, 2014, to October 14, 2017, spanning four seasons and 40 episodes. It depicts a fictionalized insider's view of the personal computer revolution of the 1980s and the early days of the World Wide Web in the early 1990s. The show's title is a reference to Halt and Catch Fire (HCF), an idiom for machine code instructions that would cause a computer's central processing unit to cease meaningful operation (and, in an exaggeration, catch fire).

In season one, the fictional company Cardiff Electric makes its first foray into personal computing with a project to reverse engineer an IBM PC and build a clone, led by entrepreneur Joe MacMillan (Lee Pace) with the help of computer engineer Gordon Clark (Scoot McNairy) and prodigy programmer Cameron Howe (Mackenzie Davis). Seasons two and three shift focus to a startup company, the online community Mutiny, headed by Cameron and Gordon's wife Donna (Kerry Bishé), while Joe ventures out on his own. The fourth and final season focuses on competing web search engines involving all the principal characters.

Halt and Catch Fire marked the first jobs that Cantwell and Rogers had in the television industry. They wrote the pilot hoping to use it to secure jobs as writers, but they instead landed their own series with AMC. The initial inspiration for the series was drawn from Cantwell's childhood in the Dallas–Fort Worth area, located within northern Texas's Silicon Prairie, where his father worked as a software salesman. The creators subsequently researched the contributions of Texan firms to the emerging personal computing industry during the 1980s. Self-produced by the network and mostly filmed in the Atlanta, Georgia, area, the series is set in the Silicon Prairie for its first two seasons and Silicon Valley for its latter two.

Halt and Catch Fire experienced low viewership ratings throughout its run, with only the first episode surpassing one million viewers for its initial broadcast. The series debuted to generally favorable reviews, though many critics initially found it derivative of other series such as Mad Men. In each subsequent season, the series grew in acclaim, and by the time it concluded, critics considered it among the greatest shows of the 2010s. Several publications have ranked it among the greatest shows of the 21st century.

== Premise ==
Taking place over a period of more than ten years, Halt and Catch Fire depicts a fictionalized insider's view of the personal computer revolution of the 1980s and the early days of the World Wide Web in the early 1990s. The series begins in 1983, just as IBM is cornering the personal computer market with the IBM PC. Entrepreneur Joe MacMillan joins Cardiff Electric, a fictional Dallas-based mainframe software company, and has a vision of building a revolutionary computer to challenge IBM. For the project, he enlists the help of computer engineer Gordon Clark and prodigy programmer Cameron Howe. Taking advantage of the open architecture of the IBM PC, the characters reverse engineer its BIOS and set out to build a clone called the "Giant", but obstacles both internal and external threaten to derail the project. Halt and Catch Fire follows the protagonists' endeavors in the computing industry, their shifting partnerships and competitive relationships, and the personal costs of pursuing their professional ambitions.

== Cast and characters ==
=== Main ===
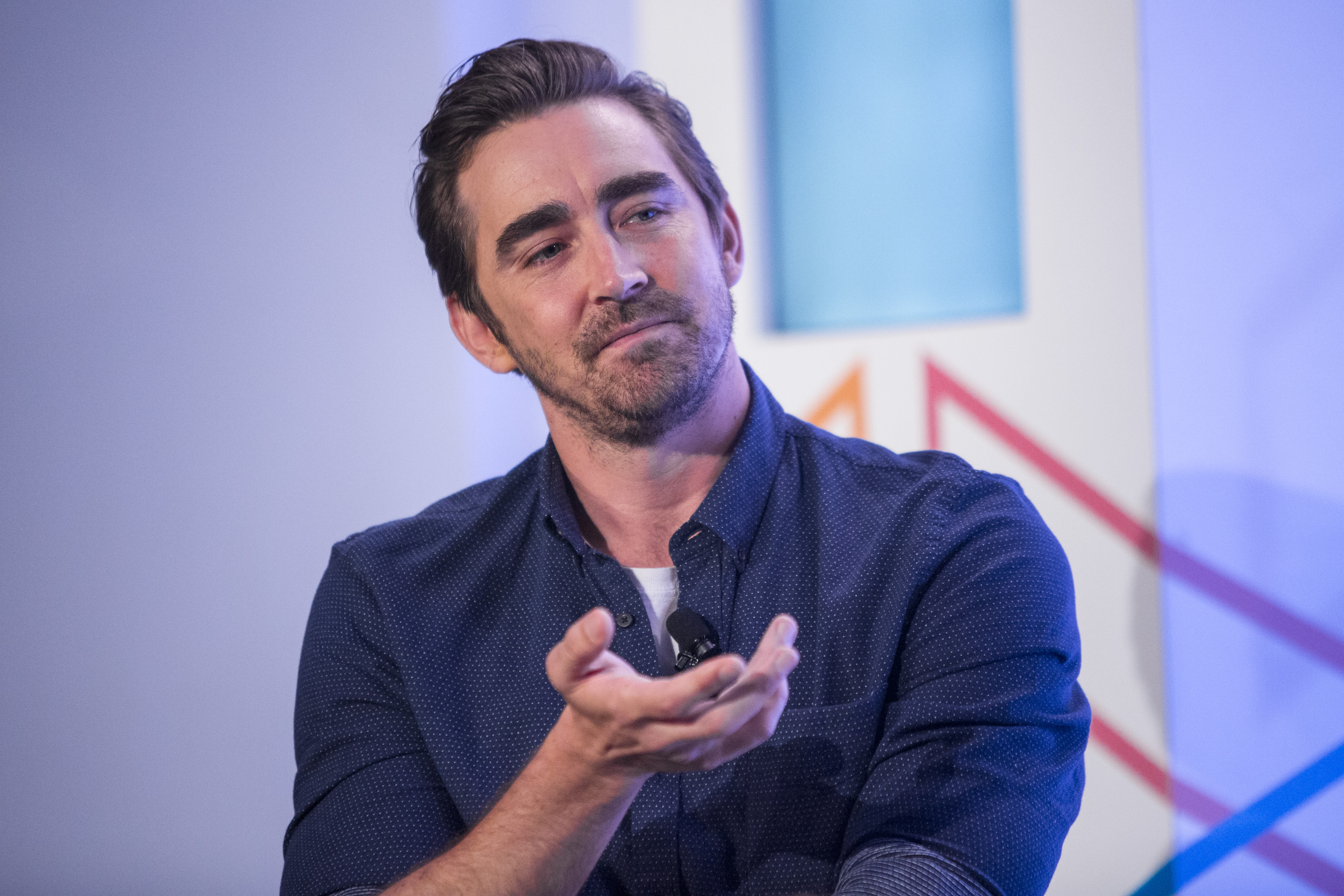
Lee Pace portrayed Joe MacMillan.

- Lee Pace as Joe MacMillan: an entrepreneur and former IBM sales executive who joins Cardiff Electric and instigates a project to reverse engineer the IBM PC. Joe is a charismatic, slick-talking businessman and a tech visionary obsessed with pursuing "the next big thing", despite a lack of technical skills. Owing to the creators' original conception of him as an antihero, Joe uses manipulative tactics in his endeavors, bending people to his will to get what he wants. He is portrayed as an enigmatic figure with a dark backstory, having left IBM under mysterious circumstances. The Sydney Morning Herald described Joe as an "acutely damaged man underneath the slick suits, bravado and motivational speak", while Pace said his character was hiding behind a persona. Critics compared Joe to the Mad Men character Don Draper. In subsequent seasons, Joe is humbled by his professional failures and how his actions affect other people, and as he comes to terms with his behavior, he becomes what critics felt was a more empathetic character. Pace said that Joe's bisexuality was a reflection of the character being a "mutable person", "a questioner and a disrupter", and someone who "doesn't feel limitations". The idea for the character was inspired by co-creator Christopher Cantwell's father, who was a software salesman. For Joe's personality, Pace recalled "corporate raiders and that kind of spirit of '80s excess" upon reading the pilot, and he took inspiration from real-life figures Steve Jobs, Ivan Boesky, and Michael Milken, as well as the fictional characters Patrick Bateman and Gordon Gekko. Later in the series, Joe initiates projects involving time-sharing, antivirus software (MacMillan Utility), the NSFNET computer network, and a search engine (Comet).

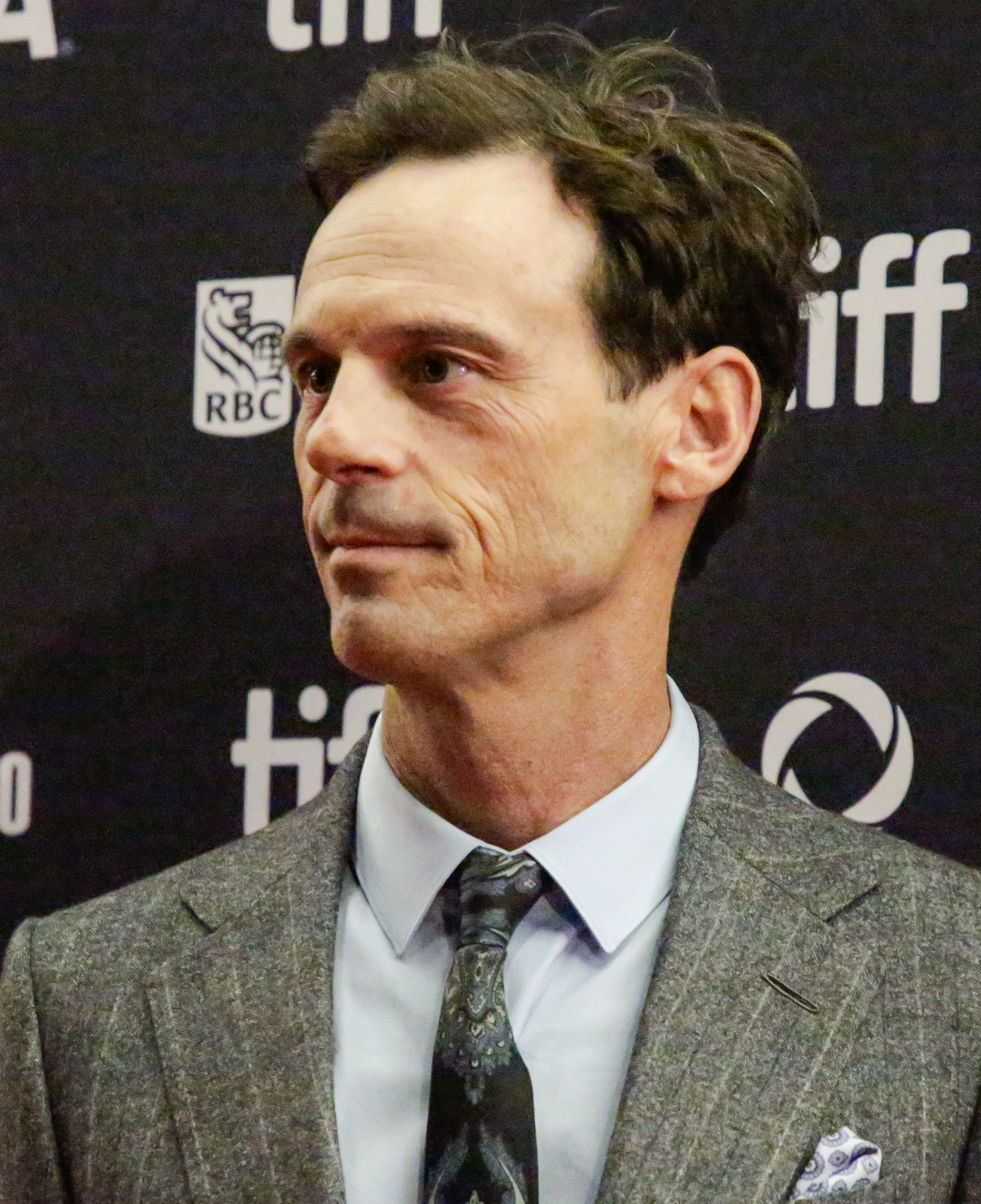
Scoot McNairy portrayed Gordon Clark.

- Scoot McNairy as Gordon Clark: a computer engineer at Cardiff Electric who Joe recruits to reverse engineer the IBM PC and lead the Giant's hardware team. After the failure of the Symphonic, a computer he built with his wife Donna years earlier, Gordon gave up on his dreams and retreated to a dead-end job before having his ambitions reignited by Joe. Farhad Manjoo of The New York Times likened Gordon to Breaking Bad's protagonist Walter White, calling him "apparently brilliant but underutilized in his job, and smugly depressive about his lot in life". Cantwell said that McNairy was cast in the role because the creators wanted an actor "who could be a nebbish, with his shoulders shrunken in, but then also reveal himself unexpectedly to be a budding alpha male." Despite not having a background in computing, McNairy related to his character as a fellow tinkerer and builder, drawing from his interest in fixing engines, radios, and air conditioners and his experience in carpentry. McNairy built the foundation of his character on having a chip on his shoulder and something to prove, which were personality traits he came across from researching computer engineers of the past. Critics also compared Gordon's working dynamic with Joe to that of Steve Wozniak with Steve Jobs, two co-founders of Apple Computer. Gordon's talents are frequently undercut by poor decisions and bad luck, as well as his deteriorating mental state due to toxic encephalopathy, the result of extended exposure to lead solder; Dennis Perkins of The A.V. Club called him "Halt's tragic hero—the dreamer without the necessary piece to ever truly succeed". In subsequent seasons, Gordon works at Mutiny, runs the CalNect Internet service provider, and co-founds the Comet search engine.

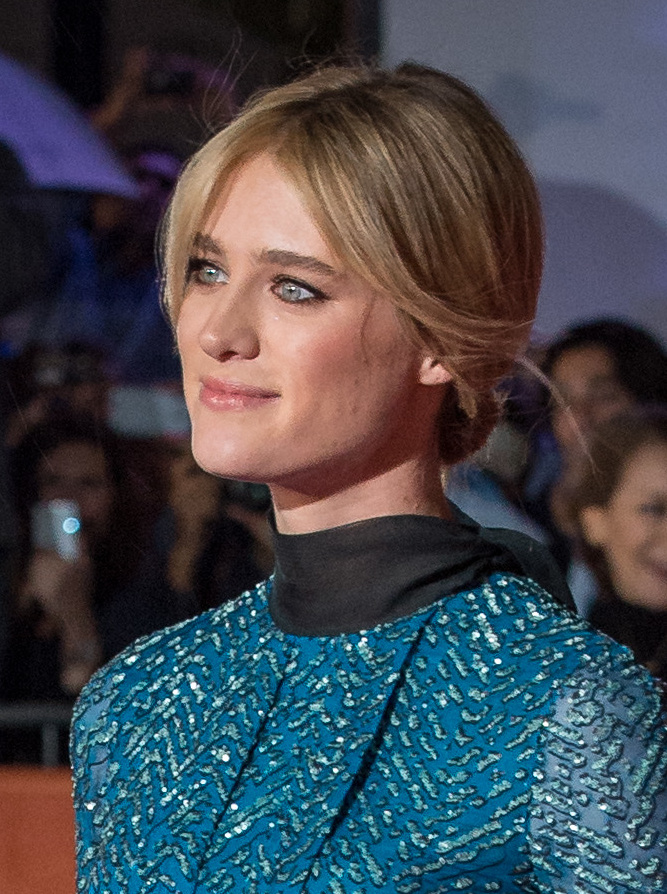
Mackenzie Davis portrayed Cameron Howe.

- Mackenzie Davis as Cameron Howe (born Catherine Howe): a computer programming prodigy who is recruited from a university by Joe to join Cardiff Electric and write the Giant's BIOS. The creators made the character female and a punk because they wanted to depict someone who was disruptive to the 1980s corporate culture of the tech industry, while her interest in video games was meant to signify the coming generation and its technology. Davis said that her character "doesn't fit into this male-dominated computer world, nor does she fit into the idea of feminine beauty of Texas and the South" with her androgynous appearance. A video game designer, Cameron later forms her own startup company, the online gaming service Mutiny, which she runs with Donna. To prepare for the role, Davis drew from prior experience writing HTML in a high school class, and she watched online programming courses from the Massachusetts Institute of Technology while trying to get into the mindset of a college student. She also researched the history of women's roles in the tech industry, as well as early hackers such as phone phreakers. Her character was inspired by people such as Sierra On-Line game designer Roberta Williams, Centipede designer Dona Bailey, and pioneering programmers Grace Hopper and Ada Lovelace. Cameron is anti-social, and finds the "truest expression of herself" through her work. James Poniewozik called her an "idealist who saw computing as art—the machines could have personality, could inspire emotion, could be a place to play". Filling the void left by her father's death during the Vietnam War, Cameron's frequent co-worker John Bosworth becomes a father figure to her. After Mutiny, she goes to work for Atari and develops the successful Space Bike game series.

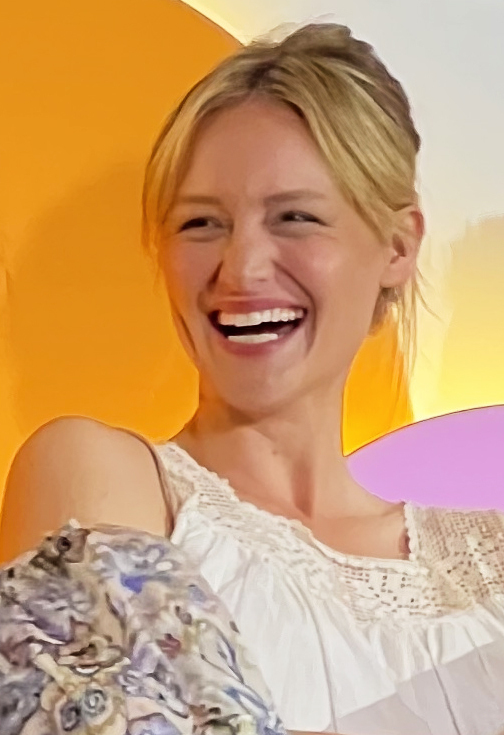
Kerry Bishé portrayed Donna Clark.

- Kerry Bishé as Donna Clark (née Emerson): a computer engineer at Texas Instruments. After a failed attempt to build a computer with her husband Gordon years earlier, Donna put her dreams on hold to focus on raising their two daughters, and she has misgivings about him getting involved in the Giant's development. To dispel the notion that her character was merely the disapproving, "wet blanket wife" in a television drama, Bishé was adamant that she be able to adroitly disassemble and fix the children's Speak & Spell in the series pilot, hinting at the depth of her character. Donna is eventually enlisted by Gordon to aid Cardiff Electric with the development of the Giant. Contrasting with her character's technical expertise, Bishé described herself as a Luddite, and in preparing for the role, she did not find it necessary to "understand the way the computers work" but rather she wanted to "understand the people that understand the way computers work". The backstory and first initials of Gordon and Donna were references to Gary and Dorothy Kildall, the married couple who founded Digital Research and whose CP/M operating system was displaced after IBM's introduction of DOS. After Gordon's pursuit of his dreams in the first season, Donna takes the opportunity to pursue her own ambitions when she joins Mutiny to co-manage the company with Cameron. There, she reluctantly "becom[es] den mother to Mutiny's nerdy employees", her pragmatism contrasting with Cameron's manic work style. Donna grows into a "savvy businesswoman", and after Mutiny, she joins a venture capital firm, culminating her evolution from "unfulfilled sidekick to cutthroat Silicon Valley executive". Like Cameron, Donna was partially inspired by Williams, Bailey, Hopper, and Lovelace.

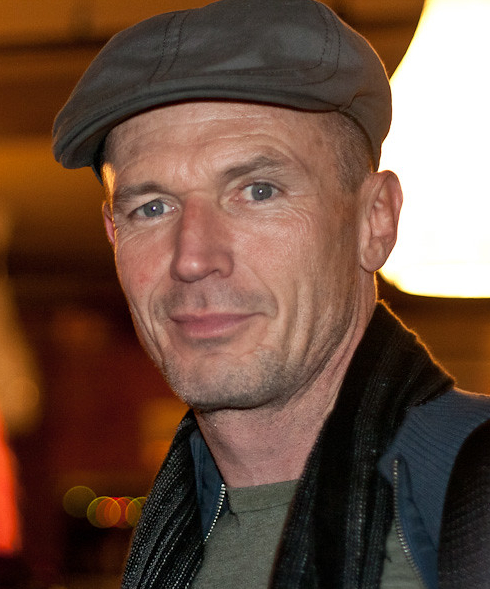
Toby Huss portrayed John Bosworth.

- Toby Huss as John "Bos" Bosworth: the senior vice president of Cardiff Electric who hires Joe. John is a back-slapping businessman known for his folksy, "good ol' boy" charm. In the first season, he represents the "established Texas American capitalist patriarchy", according to Huss, and is positioned as an antagonist to the other characters building the Giant. Huss said the creators initially envisioned the character as "an older, sedentary kind of conservative Republican Texas guy", but they decided to shift course for the character after Huss gave an unexpectedly energetic performance in his audition. The writers subsequently wrote to what Rogers called a "really surprising warmth and vulnerability" that Huss brought to the character, as well as his unexpected chemistry with Davis during their scenes together. John subsequently becomes a father figure to Cameron, having neglected his own family over the years due to his job. John was based on "Black" Jack Bertram, an IBM executive. For the character, Huss took inspiration partly from his uncle Tom Rollins, a long-time employee of the oil industry in Houston, and he developed John's accent by blending the speaking styles of his Iowan father and the Montanan Rollins. Amidst the changing landscape of the technology industry, John grapples with how to adapt to avoid becoming a "dinosaur aging out of the business". In the process, he becomes more open-minded and acknowledges the brilliance of the young developers and their innovations. After Cardiff Electric, he is hired by Cameron to provide managerial experience at Mutiny, and later by Donna to oversee the search engine Rover.
- Aleksa Palladino as Sara Wheeler (season 2): A freelance journalist and Joe's romantic partner.

=== Recurring ===
- Morgan Hinkleman (seasons 1–3) and Kathryn Newton (seasons 3–4) as Joanie Clark, the older daughter of Gordon and Donna
- Alana Cavanaugh (seasons 1–3) and Susanna Skaggs (season 4) as Haley Clark, the younger daughter of Gordon and Donna
- August Emerson as Malcolm "Lev" Levitan (seasons 1–3), a programmer for Cardiff Electric and later Mutiny
- Cooper Andrews as Yo-Yo Engberk (seasons 1–3), a programmer for Cardiff Electric and later Mutiny
- David Wilson Barnes as Dale Butler (seasons 1, 4), Joe's former IBM colleague
- Randy Havens as Stan (season 1–2), a Cardiff Electric employee
- Graham Beckel as Nathan Cardiff (seasons 1–2), the owner of Cardiff Electric
- Annette O'Toole as Susan Emerson (seasons 1–2), Donna's mother
- Mike Pniewski as Barry Shields (seasons 1–2), Cardiff Electric's lawyer
- Scott Michael Foster as Hunt Whitmarsh (season 1), Donna's manager at Texas Instruments
- John Getz as Joe MacMillan, Sr. (season 1), Joe's father who works for IBM
- Bianca Malinowski as Debbie (season 1), Bosworth's secretary at Cardiff Electric
- Eric Goins as Larry (seasons 1–2), a Cardiff Electric employee
- Justin Randell Brooke as Dave (seasons 1–3), a programmer for Mutiny
- Pete Burris as Ed (seasons 1–2), a Cardiff Electric employee
- Mark O'Brien as Tom Rendon (seasons 2–4), a programmer for Mutiny and Cameron's boyfriend
- James Cromwell as Jacob Wheeler (season 2), Sara's father and the CEO of Westgroup
- Gabriel Manak as Arki (seasons 2–3), a programmer for Mutiny
- Nick Pupo as Carl (seasons 2–3), a programmer for Mutiny
- Joshua Hoover as Bodie (seasons 2–3), a programmer for Mutiny
- J. Elijah Cho as Wonderboy (seasons 2–3), a programmer for Mutiny
- Annabeth Gish as Diane Gould (seasons 3–4), a venture capitalist who becomes involved with Mutiny
- Manish Dayal as Ryan Ray (season 3), a programmer at Mutiny and later at MacMillan Utility who becomes Joe's protégé
- Matthew Lillard as Ken Diebold (season 3), an executive at MacMillan Utility
- Sasha Morfaw as Tanya Reese (season 4), an AGGEK employee
- Charlie Bodin as Trip Kisker III (season 4), an AGGEK employee
- Anna Chlumsky as Katie Herman (season 4), a Comet employee and Gordon's girlfriend
- Molly Ephraim as Alexa Vonn (season 4), Cameron's financier for an independent project

== Production ==
=== Conception ===
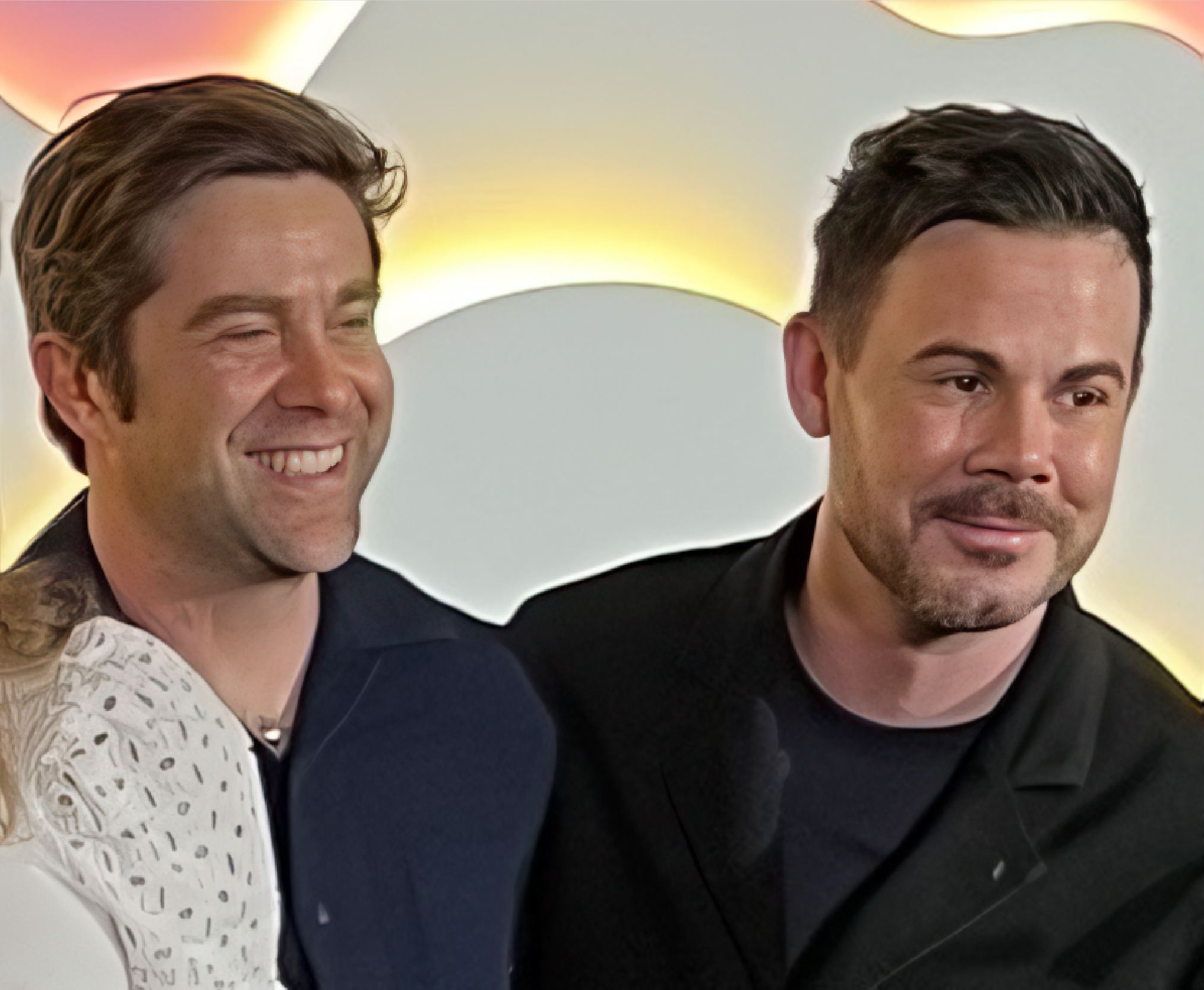
Co-creators Christopher C. Rogers and Christopher Cantwell at the series's 10th anniversary panel at the ATX TV Festival in 2024

Halt and Catch Fire was created by Christopher Cantwell and Christopher C. Rogers, who met while working at the Walt Disney Company. Cantwell's online movie company was acquired by Disney and he was moved into its marketing department, while Rogers was hired by Cantwell's team to manage Disney's editorial program for social media. After a year of working together, they learned that they had each graduated from screenwriting programs in college—Cantwell from the University of Southern California as an undergraduate student, and Rogers from the University of California, Los Angeles as a graduate student. Rogers referred to himself and Cantwell as "dream-deferred writers". In August 2010, they agreed to partner as screenwriters. For their first collaboration, Rogers helped Cantwell with creating a television adaptation of his film screenplay Very Prepared Men, a story about a secret society of the ultra-wealthy. Rogers shared the script with Chris Huvane, a former colleague from Condé Nast who had become a talent manager at Management 360. Huvane and his coworker Jennifer Graham offered to represent Cantwell and Rogers, while urging them to produce another script they could use as a staffing sample. Since the managers thought it was unlikely a network would option a script from first-time writers, their intent was to use the sample script to land Cantwell and Rogers entry-level writing positions in the industry. The managers advised them to write something in which they were personally invested.

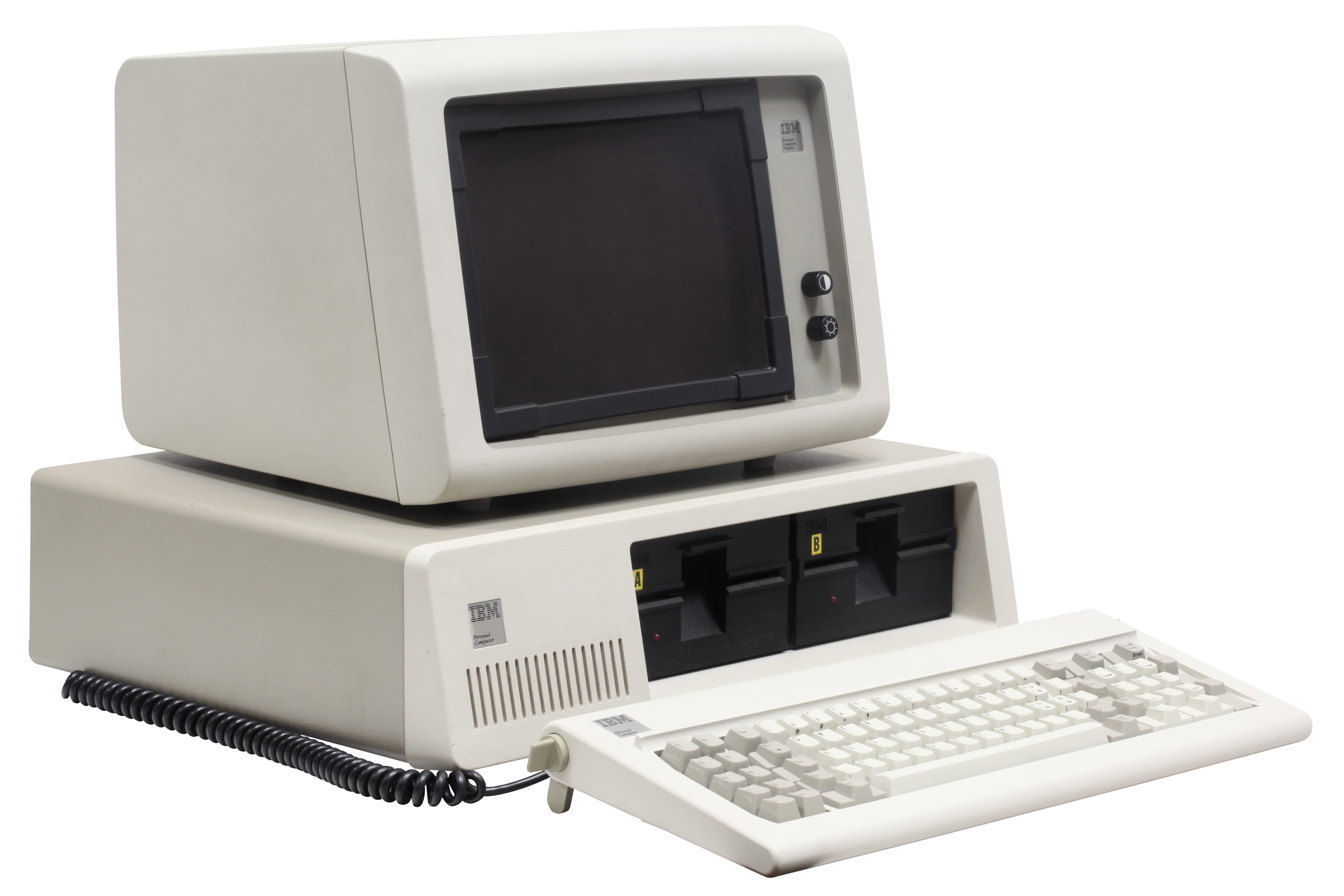
The original IBM Personal Computer. The real-life attempts to reverse engineer it inspired the series's pilot.

Cantwell and Rogers initially discussed "men under pressure" stories like Glengarry Glen Ross, although they did not want their subjects to be doctors or police officers, believing them to be well-trod territory in television. As they brainstormed, Cantwell recalled his childhood; in 1982, when he was just six weeks old, his family moved from Elgin, Illinois, to Plano, Texas, so his father could take a job as a systems software salesman for UCCEL Corp. During his childhood, Cantwell had been unaware of Texas's role in the personal computer revolution of the 1980s, but after speaking to his father and researching the era with Rogers, they learned how the Silicon Prairie of Dallas–Fort Worth (in which Plano is located) became a secondary technology hub behind California's Silicon Valley. Companies in the Silicon Prairie included Texas Instruments, Electronic Data Systems, Tandy, and RadioShack, while elsewhere in Texas, Dell (in Austin) and Compaq (in Houston) were also prominent players in the PC industry. Executive producer Jonathan Lisco said: "[Texas] was viewed by a lot of people at the time, per our research, as sort of a catch basin for people who had not succeeded [in Silicon Valley]. On the other hand, there was a lot of wonderful tech going on here." Cantwell said that he and Rogers were intrigued by the lesser-known players and settings of the tech industry: "We wanted to find the place you didn't know. Silicon Valley, Boston, New York, IBM, Microsoft, all those stories and companies have been exploited dramatically to great effect." In their research, Cantwell and Rogers came across stories of computer engineers at Compaq taking risks by attempting to reverse engineer the IBM PC. The duo conceived the pilot for Halt and Catch Fire in January 2011. The first eight pages of the script followed their protagonist Joe MacMillan at IBM. In May, Cantwell quit his job at Disney, though Rogers remained until the future of their project was assured.

=== Development ===
Cantwell and Rogers finished the draft of their pilot in the summer of 2011. Their agents liked the script but were not optimistic about selling it. After a few unproductive meetings, Cantwell and Rogers turned their attention to writing film scripts; one of them called The Knoll, about the assassination of John F. Kennedy, appeared on the Black List of popular unproduced screenplays. At the end of that summer, Cantwell and Rogers asked their agent again to shop the Halt and Catch Fire pilot to television networks, leading to meetings with HBO and Showtime that were mostly introductory in nature. In late October, they met with AMC, by which point Cantwell had been out of work for five months and was quickly diminishing his savings. He and Rogers were surprised to find that the AMC executives had a copy of their script at the meeting. One of them, Ben Davis, said: "We were really interested in trying to tap into that world—into the spirit of innovation, and the tech world specifically. I loved the idea that it took place in Dallas and that I didn't hear Steve Jobs' or Bill Gates' name. It approached it from the backdoor instead of straight ahead." After a second meeting with Cantwell and Rogers on December 5, 2011, AMC optioned the script the following day.

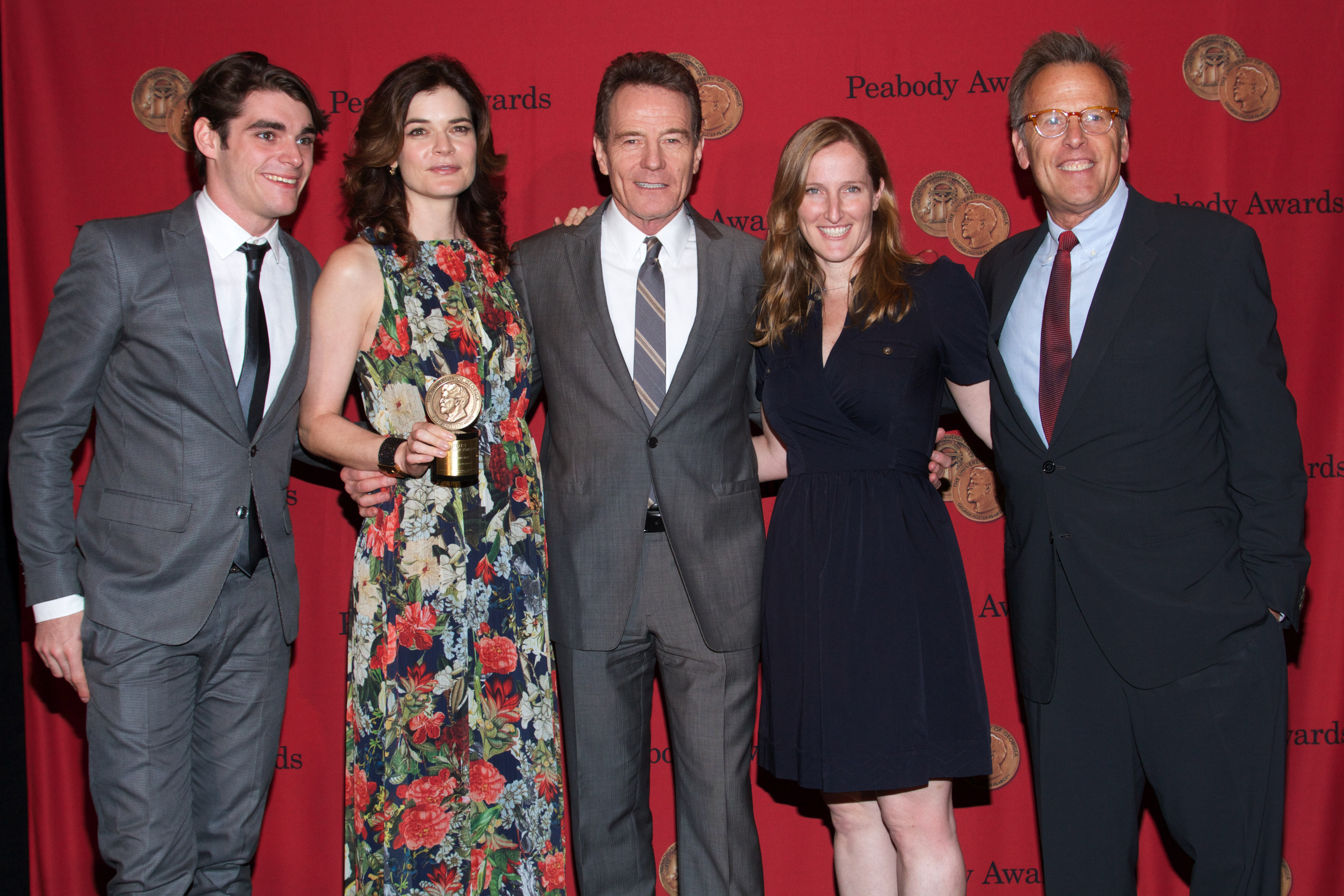
Producers Melissa Bernstein and Mark Johnson helped the series's creators during the development process.

To continue to develop the project, AMC brought in Gran Via Productions' Mark Johnson and Melissa Bernstein, who were producing the network's hit drama series Breaking Bad at the time. They helped Cantwell and Rogers refine the pilot and create a 20-page pitch document, which Rogers said they worked on "day and night". The creators called Johnson and Bernstein their "advocates... with the network". In March 2012, Cantwell learned that AMC would not make a decision about the project until autumn; by that point, he and his wife had depleted their savings. In April, Cantwell and Rogers presented Halt and Catch Fire at AMC's annual pilot script showcase, dubbed the "Bake-Off"; network executives opted to keep the project in consideration. On October 23, 2012, Cantwell and Rogers pitched the network on how they envisioned Halt and Catch Fire as a potential series. The network ordered a pilot the following month. The project was Cantwell's and Rogers's first jobs in the television industry. Cantwell said, "The first writers' room we walked into was our own." In July 2013, the network announced a series order of 10 episodes.

=== Casting ===
In February 2013, it was announced that Lee Pace had been cast in the lead role of Joe MacMillan, and Mackenzie Davis in a co-starring role as Cameron Howe. Actors that were considered for the role of Joe included David Harbour, Ryan Phillippe, and Wes Bentley. The role of Cameron took the longest to cast, with actors such as Dakota Johnson and Brie Larson auditioning for it. After Davis's screen test, the creators were convinced they had found the perfect person to portray her.

In March, it was announced that Scoot McNairy had been cast as Gordon Clark and Kerry Bishé as Gordon's wife Donna; it was a reunion for the two actors, who had played a married couple in the film Argo a year prior. Actors that auditioned for the role of Gordon included Jimmi Simpson and Jason Mantzoukas, while Karen Gillan was considered for the role of Donna. During the casting process, McNairy emailed the creators to tell them how the pilot's story resonated with him, as he grew up in Dallas and his father had been a salesman. Also in March, David Wilson Barnes was cast as Dale Butler. Barnes was initially credited among the main cast in the pilot episode, but his character was written out after just two episodes when the story went in a different direction.

For season two, Aleksa Palladino joined the cast as a regular, while James Cromwell and Mark O'Brien joined as recurring characters. For season three, Manish Dayal was cast as Ryan Ray, an Indian-American computer programmer native to San Francisco. Cantwell and Rogers created the character to match the change in demographic after the series's setting shifted to Northern California. Matthew Lillard and Annabeth Gish were also cast in recurring roles. For season four, Kathryn Newton and Susanna Skaggs were cast to play teenaged versions of the Clarks' daughters, and Anna Chlumsky joined in a supporting role.

Prior to the fourth season, AMC addressed the gender pay gap among its four leads by giving Davis and Bishé salary raises to match what Pace and McNairy were earning. Davis and Bishé were relatively unknown when they signed their original deals at lower salaries; Davis was earning the minimum rate at the time. Their characters were given more screen time beginning with the second season, but the actresses did not feel they were being equitably compensated for their work. Before Davis and Bishé could renegotiate with AMC, the network gave them unsolicited raises.

=== Showrunners ===
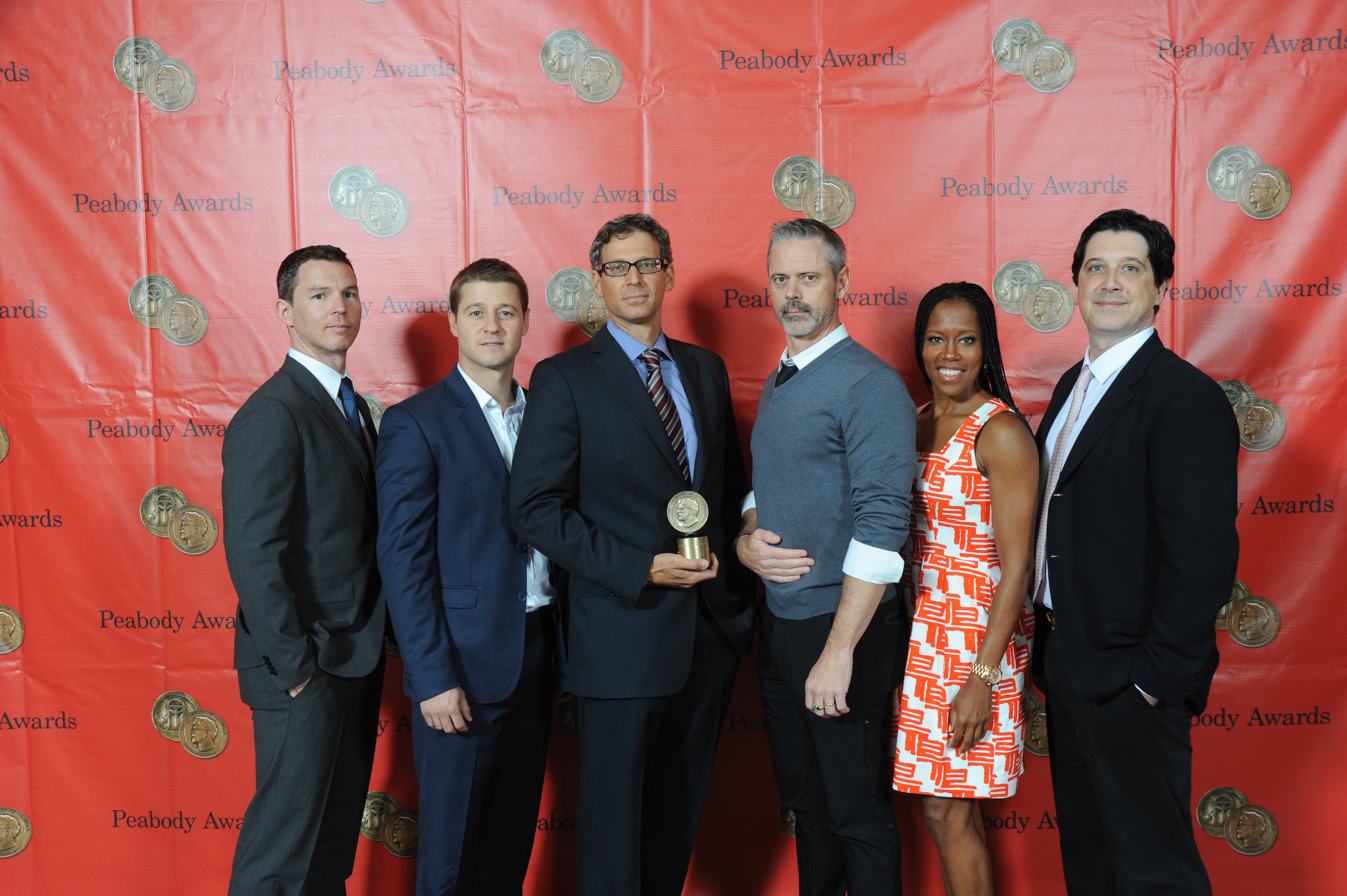
Producer Jonathan Lisco served as the series showrunner for the first two seasons.

Since Cantwell and Rogers were new to the television industry, AMC wanted someone with more experience to be the series's showrunner. The network consequently hired Jonathan Lisco for the role in July 2013 as part of a two-year deal, following his three-season tenure as an executive producer of the drama series Southland. Lisco was impressed by the pilot script for Halt and Catch Fire but initially was unconvinced that he was best suited to be the showrunner. He did not view himself as a technophile and wondered if there would be "enough stakes in the bits and the bytes", saying the subject matter did not "dramatically blow your hair back". The network assuaged his concerns by telling him that they believed he could delve deep into the characters to create stakes. Lisco also felt an immediate creative connection with Cantwell and Rogers upon meeting them, and sensing they had a strong vision for the series, he signed on as showrunner. Leasing office space in Studio City, Los Angeles, Lisco guided Cantwell and Rogers through the process of assessing and hiring writers.

After two seasons, Lisco stepped down as the showrunner to work on the TNT television series Animal Kingdom. Joel Stillerman, AMC's president of original programming and development, called Lisco's departure "completely amicable". Cantwell and Rogers took over as showrunners prior to the third season. Rogers called Lisco the duo's mentor, saying: "He kept us creatively involved and really showed us the ropes, and we felt like it was a master class in how to run a room, both in terms of getting a great story out of people, and in terms of being a really good and decent and fair person in what can sometimes be a brutal industry."

=== Pre-production and research ===
For research, the production staff and cast watched Robert X. Cringely's documentary Triumph of the Nerds and read the books Steve Jobs by Walter Isaacson, The Soul of a New Machine by Tracy Kidder, The Nudist on the Late Shift by Po Bronson, and The Silicon Boys by David A. Kaplan.

The series had at least three technical advisors. Industry veteran Carl Ledbetter, who worked at IBM, AT&T Consumer Products, and Sun Microsystems, collaborated both with the writers to ensure the dialogue in early scripts was technologically accurate and with the actors to refine how they delivered their lines. Ledbetter's anecdotes from his time in the computing industry informed plot points, character traits, and other in-universe details. He also wrote sample computer code that appeared on screen and helped operate props on set, which consisted of controlling lights on a breadboard from underneath a table and hand-feeding printouts through a dot matrix printer. After the series's focus shifted to networking and proto-Internet services for the second season, the producers relied more on the expertise of Bill Louden, who founded the GEnie online service for General Electric in 1985 and designed games and computer programs for CompuServe. The producers also sought out journalists such as Paul Carroll, who covered the tech industry in the 1980s for The Wall Street Journal.

Due to the production schedule, the actors did not have formal table reads of the scripts. Instead, they organized their own, gathering at Pace's house on weekends to prepare dinner, drink wine, and discuss the scripts and their characters. Davis said of the cast dinners, "it was really nice, because you got to hear other people's point of views about your character." For the third season, Pace, Davis, and McNairy lived together in a rented house in Atlanta, with Toby Huss joining them for the fourth season. The arrangement helped foster a camaraderie among the cast members.

=== Writing ===
Each season, the writers strove to "use up [their] story fast" rather than save the most dramatic moments for later. Rogers said that the uncertainty of the series's fate from season to season "reinforced a hold-nothing-back mindset in the storytelling". They aimed to advance the plot quickly enough that it would not be predictable. Rogers described their approach: "We want to put ourselves into corners and ask ourselves to write out of them." To avoid depicting binary relationships between the characters of either getting along or fighting, the writers attempted to change the dynamics between the characters, often by creating new pairings to interact with one another.

Since Cantwell and Rogers originally intended to use the pilot to secure writing jobs on existing series they liked, they wrote it to emulate "difficult men" dramas such as The Sopranos, The Wire, and Breaking Bad that inspired them to get into television. Joe MacMillan was written in the pilot as a traditional antihero, with the world organized around him. Once the series was picked up and the staff began writing additional episodes, Rogers said they found their own voice and fell into what he called a "writers' groove". Rogers acknowledged his and Cantwell's inexperience as writers but said that they were "careful enough to lay... these little grenades into each character" that the writers could later "explode" to evolve the characters beyond their archetypes. Bishé said that when the cast signed onto the series, they believed it would be a "slick corporate thriller", but over time it evolved into an ensemble-based "real human drama". Cantwell said the dynamic between Joe and Gordon in the first season was inspired by his father's experience in software sales in the 1980s; Cantwell's father pitched to clients on sales calls, while the software engineer he would bring along would explain the technical details.

In the second season, the series's narrative began to focus on the partnership of Donna and Cameron in their startup company, the online gaming service Mutiny. Rogers said the technology of the time period seemed to point to "this proto-internet connectivity" and that as actors, Bishé and Davis deserved more attention. Cantwell said that the staff did not consciously refocus the show around the female characters, but rather it naturally developed that way as they sought to create "compelling and earned stories for each of those characters based on where [they] left them in season one". Rogers said the first-season partnership between Joe and Gordon was dominated by egos, a need to prove themselves, and a lack of mutual respect. The writers did not want to repeat that dynamic in the Donna–Cameron partnership, and instead created a "bedrock" on which a friendship could be built. The theme of connectivity was incorporated into the season as an exploration of whether technology "brings us closer together or pushes us apart", as well as what the characters' motivations were for their involvement in the industry. The second season also isolated Joe and Gordon somewhat from the main storylines to reflect an "absence of connection". Cantwell and Rogers liked making viewers think they were "the worst writers in the world for about five minutes" by creating familiar situations, only to subvert expectations with the result.

Between the second and third seasons, all of the series's writers departed to work on their own projects, requiring Cantwell and Rogers to build a new writing staff. The creators rented a house in Joshua Tree National Park for three days in October 2015 to discuss how they wanted to plot out the season's story. They wanted to reach the advent of the World Wide Web in 1990, which they considered an exciting setting and a natural destination for the series. However, doing so would have required them to advance the plot by four years from the end of season two. They thought they still "had so much story left on the table at the end of season two" with the characters' arrival in California in 1986 that they did not want to skip over with a time jump. Ultimately, instead of choosing one approach, they decided to incorporate both of them; the majority of the season takes place in 1986 before making a time jump to 1990 for the final two episodes. With the new setting in Silicon Valley, Cantwell and Rogers wanted to explore if the characters who had demonstrated their potential in Texas could "really pull it off once they're in the big leagues". One of their themes for season three was "people with the right idea at the wrong time" who failed due to market or technology forces not aligning.

Heading into the fourth season, Cantwell and Rogers knew it would be the series's final one, giving them the opportunity to write a conclusion on their own terms. In researching the tech industry following the inception of the World Wide Web in 1990, they found that there was not "a lot of major business investments [or] huge development in the web" for several years due to its nascency. As a result, they created another time jump in the series's storytelling. The opening sequence in the season's first episode shows the passage of more than three years and was meant to depict the characters in stasis, waiting for the technology world to catch on. In the final season, Cantwell and Rogers wanted the characters to grapple with the existential question of whether their continued pursuits of the next big idea could ever make them feel whole and whether they could break free from the constant cycle of reinvention. As the season was being written in 2017, a potential strike by the Writers Guild of America loomed. Fearing an abrupt end to their series, Cantwell and Rogers proposed alternate plans to their writing staff for how the show could be written to a conclusion more quickly. After receiving pushback from the writers that it would undermine their strike, Cantwell and Rogers abandoned any such plans in solidarity; the strike ultimately did not occur. The creators decided to kill off a major character during the season but did not plan in advance when it would occur. Eventually, they plotted it into the seventh episode, allowing them to dedicate the eighth episode to the characters' grief, before incorporating it into the two-part finale, in which they wrapped up the series's remaining plot threads.

=== Filming ===
Halt and Catch Fire was produced in-house by AMC Studios. Although the series was set in Dallas and Silicon Valley, it was primarily filmed in and around Atlanta, Georgia, where the studio has infrastructure and crew due to state tax incentives that are favorable to filming. The writing staff, however, was based in Los Angeles. Many crew members who worked on another Atlanta-based AMC series, The Walking Dead, were borrowed during its offseason to work on Halt and Catch Fire. The series was shot using Arri Alexa cameras, with dailies being delivered by FotoKem Atlanta using their nextLAB system. The series had a budget that various sources estimated between $2–3 million per episode, which Variety said was on the lower end of cable TV dramas.

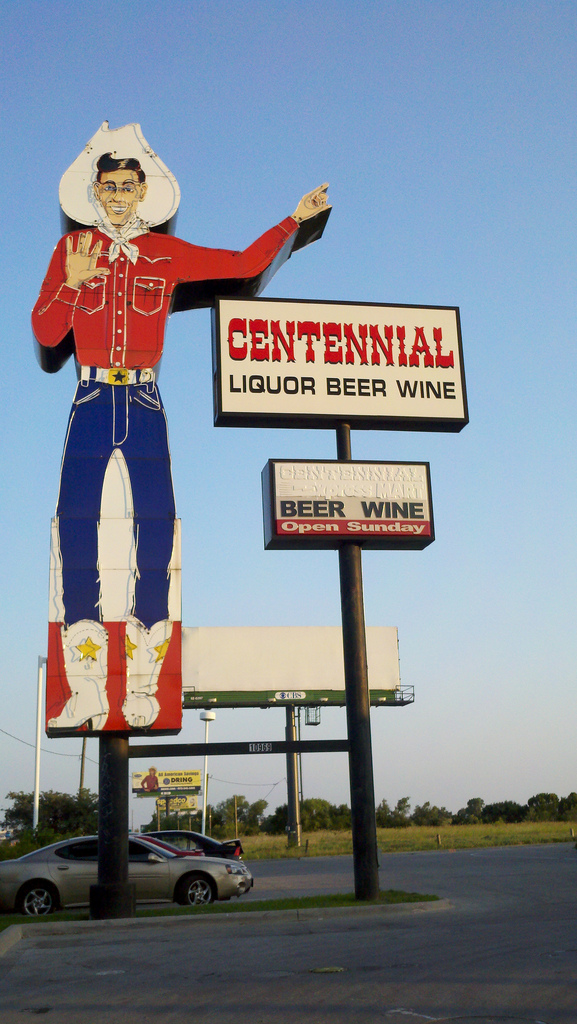
AMC paid to restore a neon sign of Big Tex in Dallas for the filming of the pilot.

The pilot was directed by Juan José Campanella and produced over six weeks from April to May 2013. It was primarily shot on location in the Atlanta area, although one set was used as Joe's condominium. Additionally, as part of a one-day shoot in Dallas in May, AMC paid to restore a 50-foot-tall neon sign of Big Tex located at a former Centennial Liquors store. For the series's visual appearance, the producers initially took inspiration from the 1970s films All the President's Men, The Parallax View, and The Conversation, according to producer Jeff Freilich. In developing his visual approach, Campanella was inspired by Russian photographer Alexander Rodchenko and the Constructivist movement, particularly in the camera angles he used. After the series was picked up, several scenes from the pilot episode were re-shot. Lisco said that the staff wanted to make the tone "a little more jagged, a little more ambiguous" by giving Cameron more edge and by exploring whether Joe is "a visionary or a fraud".

After the series order, the staff decided that the production facility housing the set for Joe's condo was too far away from other shooting locations. As a result, they partnered with Mark Henderson, Daniel Minchew, and Glenn Murer, who built the Atlanta Filmworks sound stage in a converted facility that previously served as a DuPont plant and a dog treat factory. The space comprised two adjacent 20,000-square-foot (1,900 m^{2}) warehouses and a 17,000-square-foot (1,600 m^{2}) production office. The soundproofed Studio A, measuring 110 by 200 by 42 feet (34 by 61 by 13 m), housed the set for Cardiff Electric's corporate offices, which occupied 9,000 square feet (840 m^{2}). Studio B was initially envisioned as a flex space for set construction, but ended up being used for filming as well, housing the set for Joe's condo, among others. Due to the expanded use of Studio B, several enhancements were made to it for the second season, such as quieter heaters and additional lighting.

First season filming locations

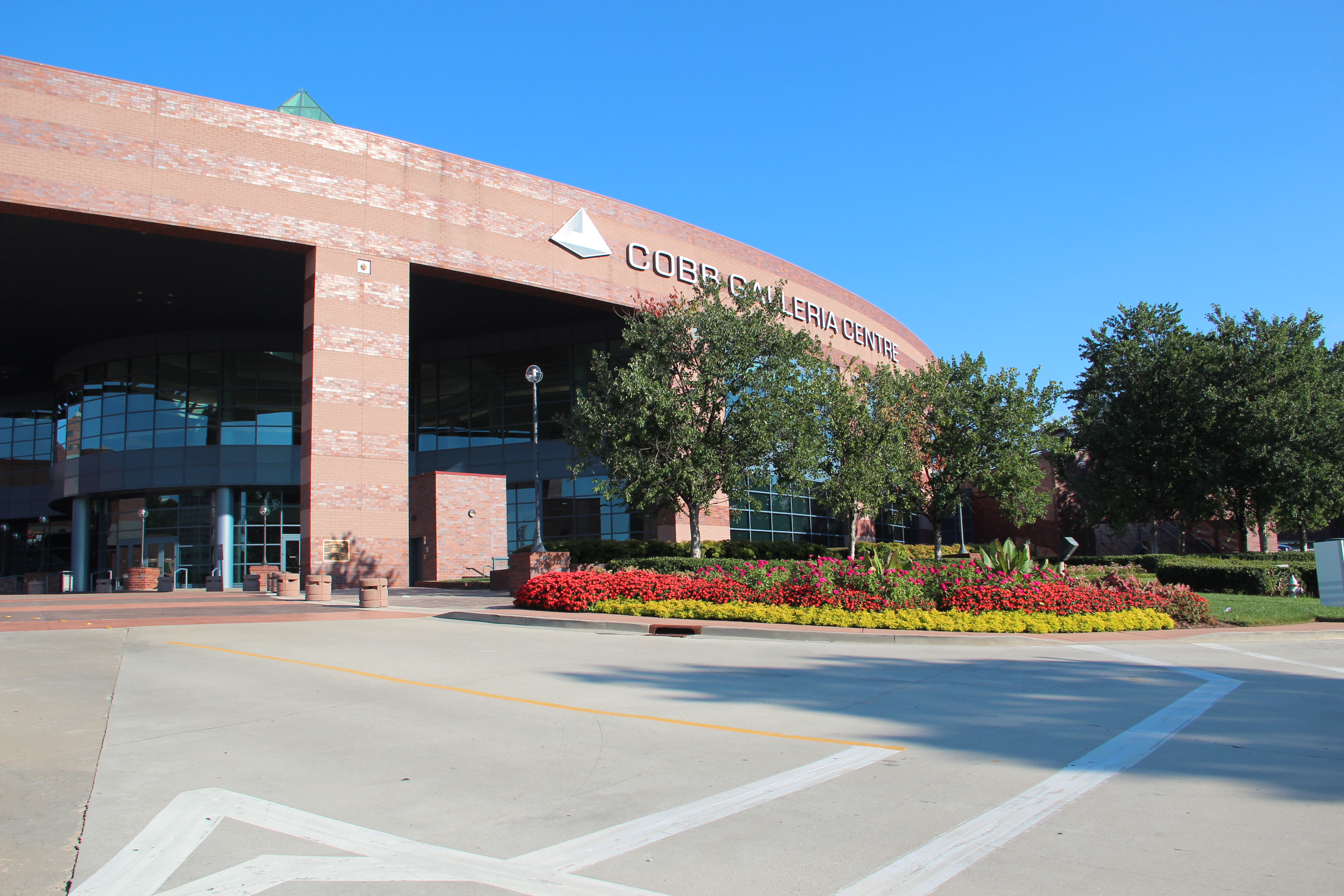
Cobb Galleria Centre

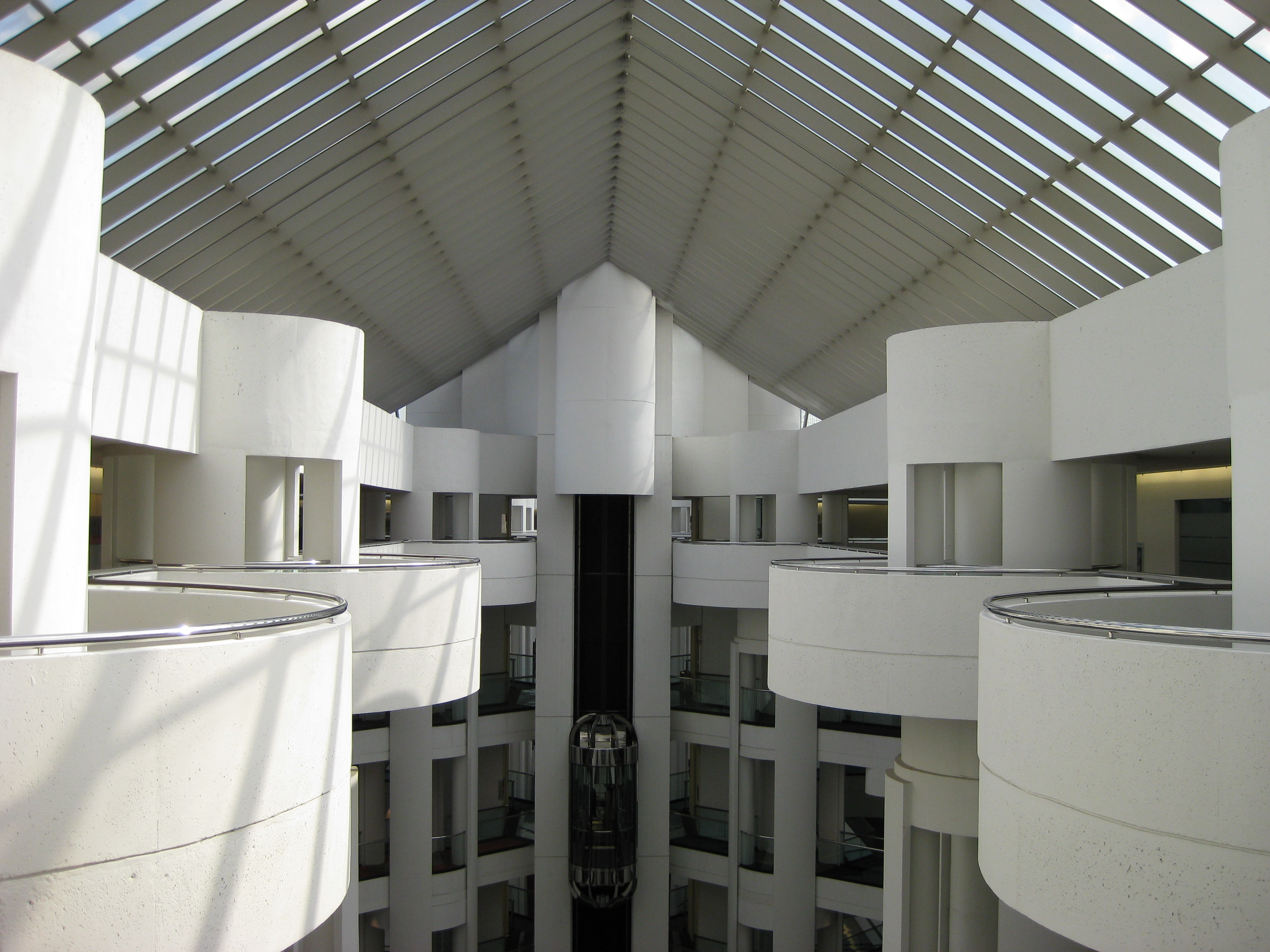
American Cancer Society Center

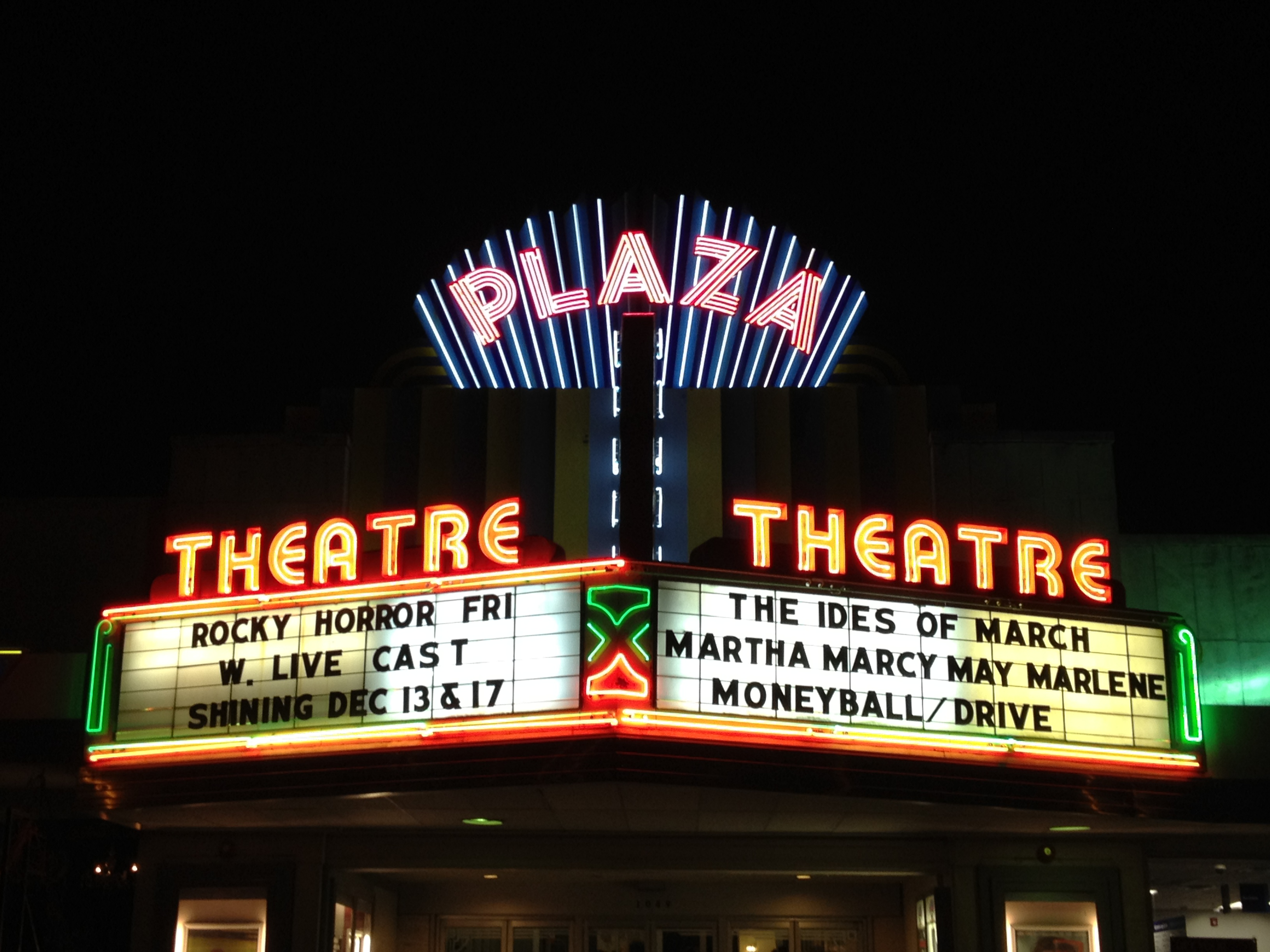
Plaza Theatre

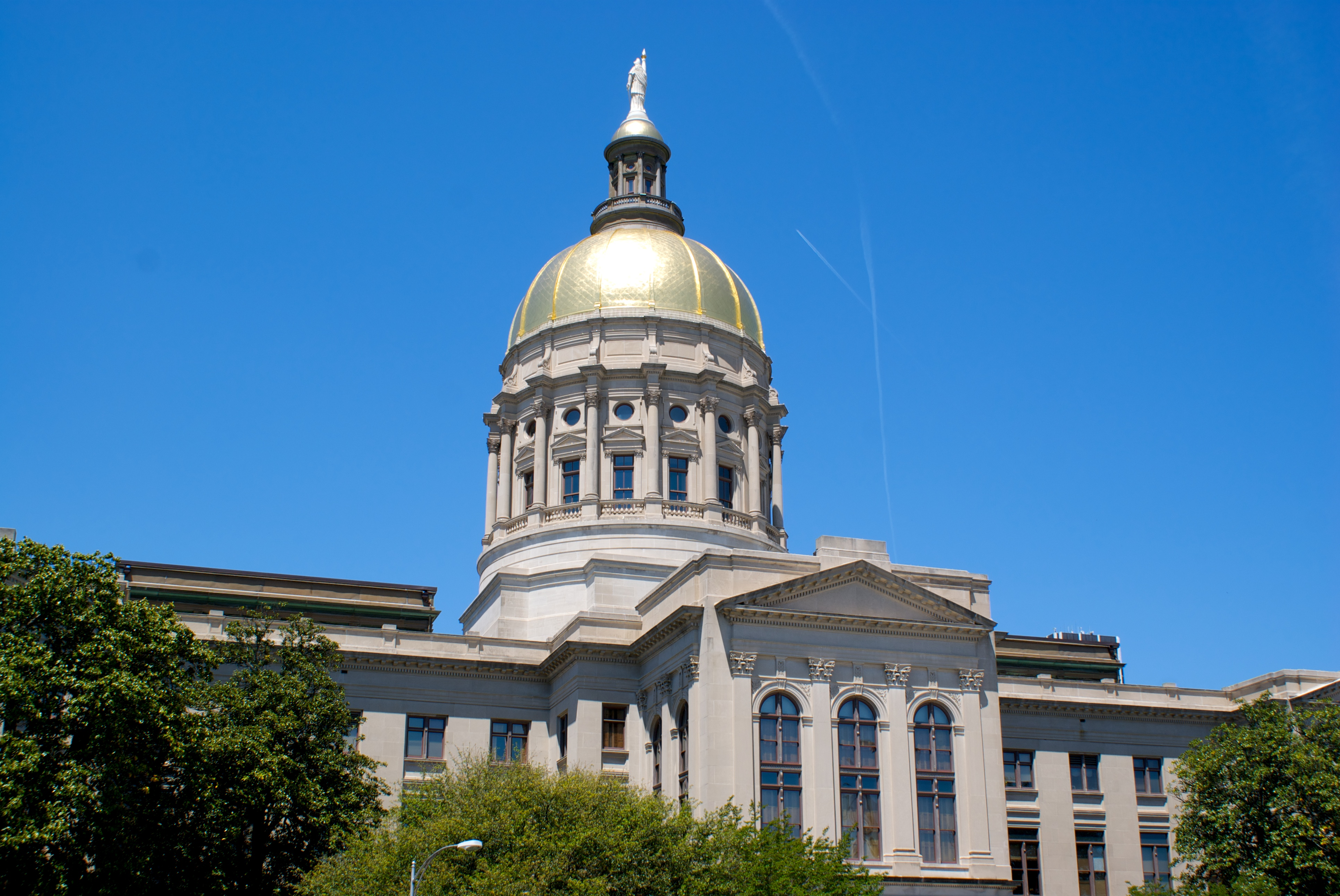
Georgia State Capitol

Production on the remaining nine episodes of the first season began in October 2013 and lasted until May 2014. The weather was uncharacteristically cold and snowy for Atlanta, complicating outdoor shoots and suspending production for a few days. Location scouting was carried out by location manager Ryan Schaetzle to find settings that would not be anachronistic and would require the least amount of modification to match the period setting. Strategic framing of shots was also used to avoid anachronisms, as was computer-generated imagery to turn an Urban Outfitters location into a rug store. Scenes set at a Las Vegas hotel hosting COMDEX attendees in the season's penultimate episode were filmed at the American Cancer Society Center in downtown Atlanta. Other first season shooting locations included the Cobb Galleria Centre, Chops Lobster Bar, Northside Tavern, the Plaza Theatre, the Georgia State Capitol, an office building near the Weather Channel's headquarters, and a brick ranch-style house in Conyers.

Production on season two lasted from October 2014 to May 2015, with filming commencing in January 2015. The staff dismantled all of the first-season sets except for the Clark family house, a decision Cantwell said was made to force the series to reinvent itself and to parallel the reinvention common within the technology industry. Production on season three took place from November 2015 to August 2016. Due to the shift in setting from Dallas to California that season, the producers hired a new director of photography, Evans Brown, to give the series a sunnier look. Despite the setting change, production of the series remained in the Atlanta area, with the exception of two scenes from that season that were shot near the Golden Gate Bridge in San Francisco.

The fourth season's first episode opens with a sequence that covers three years of story and was edited to give the appearance of a "one shot". The sequence was conceived by Campanella and filmed over two days, requiring several hairstyle and wardrobe changes to the actors. For the series finale, "Ten of Swords", Donna's and Cameron's diner scene in the closing moments of the episode was filmed at the Waffle House Museum. Donna's idea at the end of the scene is never revealed, but the producers ensured that each camera shot in the diner showed an analog aspect of life for which there would be a future digital innovation. Within a week of the series wrapping production in late July 2017, the crew transitioned to a new AMC television series, Lodge 49.

=== Production design ===
The series's production designers were Chris Brown, Craig Stearns, and Ola Maslik. Set decorator Lance Totten said the 1980s cliches of the "whole neon-pastels and shoulder pad vibe" were not prevalent until 1986, and that he focused on the design period of 1978–1983 at the series's onset. To identify period-accurate lighting fixtures, televisions, telephones, kitchenware, and curtains, he consulted: back issues of Texas Homes and D Magazine; old Sears and J. C. Penney catalogues; the Interiors books by English designer Terence Conran; and the Malls Across America collection of photographs by Michael Galinsky. Due to the difficulty of finding decor items with brass finishes, Totten often resorted to reproducing the look with gold paint or brass spray paint specially ordered from Krylon. Other heavily sought after items included: lamp shades with pleats and tapered or bell shapes; furniture with clean, linear lines and upholstery on the arms, legs, and feet; and metal constructed props instead of plastic. The set designers purchased from thrift shops, antique stores, yard sales, office supply companies that were closing, and individuals through Craigslist, but in some cases they rented items. Early 1980s seating and office furniture were difficult to acquire in large quantities, as furniture from that decade was not highly collected, other than high-end pieces by designers, and Totten said the decade marked the beginning of the era of "mass disposability". As a result, he drew from the 1960s and 1970s for certain sets, such as Bosworth's office and the Clark home. Old family photos provided by Totten and other crew members adorned certain sets to give the impression of the characters having extended family, while Totten's children drew the refrigerator art seen in the Clarks' kitchen. For old photos of Gordon and Donna, the crew reused Polaroids of McNairy and Bishé that had been taken on the set of Argo from their portrayal of a married couple in the 1970s. Prior to the second season, additional crew members were hired for the production design team to help with their extensive workload.

The architecture and design of Atlanta posed a challenge to the production design staff for achieving period accuracy. Bernstein said, "it's a new city. There are not a lot of buildings from the 1970s and 1980s." Totten said that locations that still existed from that period had been remodeled in the 1990s or 2000s and no longer had 1980s decor or color palettes, thus requiring filming locations to be re-dressed. Storefronts and restaurants were particularly difficult, as small details such as carpeting, window frames, lighting fixtures, chair upholstery patterns, and bathroom fixtures needed to be retrofitted. The season two set for the house that headquartered Mutiny, Cameron's start-up company, was designed to mimic the homes found in the Lakewood neighborhood of Dallas. Modeled after a single-story American Craftsman–style home that was popular in the 1920s, the set's design featured hardwood floors, ample trim moldings, built-in shelving painted white, and curved kitchen woodwork. For Mutiny's move to California in the third season, Stearns wanted their new office's set design to evoke the early days of Silicon Valley when startup companies operated out of older buildings. The set was designed as a converted fruit-packing warehouse with brick walls and large windows.

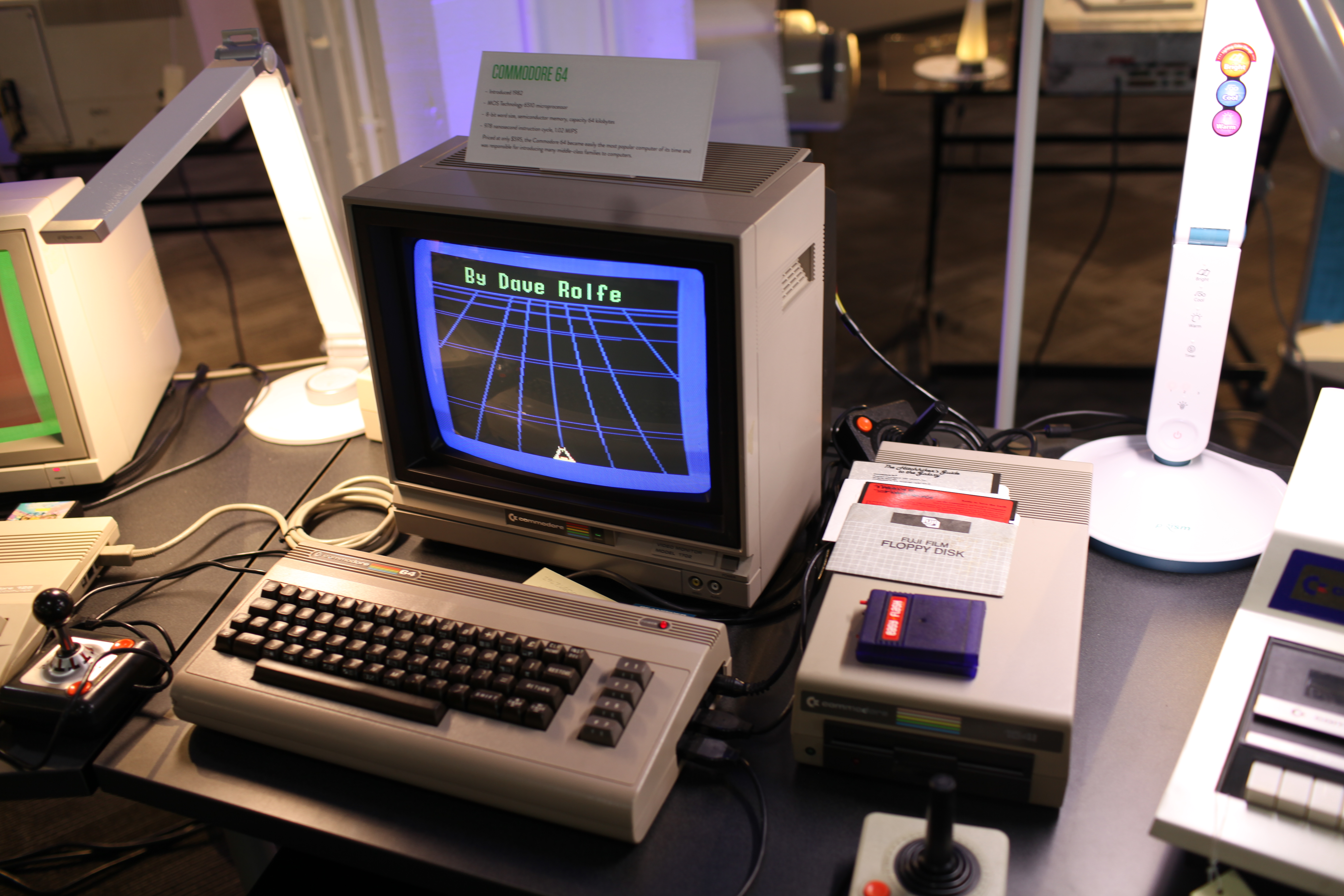
A Commodore 64 computer on display at Living Computers: Museum + Labs, which loaned equipment for use as props in the series

At the series's onset, many of the vintage computer props were obtained on eBay or from private collectors through Craigslist. One such prop was the original Apple Macintosh, which had become a collector's item and was rare. Many props were also borrowed from the Rhode Island Computer Museum. The Cardiff Giant portable PC depicted on screen was specially built for the series from molded plastic and was partially functional, as the production staff wanted to ensure the design was "consistent with the visionary thinking of the time and was not sci-fi", according to Freilich. Totten said that in order to build 40 Commodore 64 PC workstations for the Mutiny set in season two, "hundreds of different eBay purchases" were required, since the PCs, monitors, and peripherals all had to be obtained separately. One of the series's Atlanta-based technical advisors built the complex network of telephone lines and modems that hung on a wall of the Mutiny house set. From season two onwards, the series's staff collaborated with Living Computers: Museum + Labs in Seattle to obtain vintage equipment. One prop that could not be sourced was an IBM 3033 mainframe computer, requiring a replica to be built in consultation with Living Computers using original plans from IBM's archives. Obtaining period accurate corporate signage and logos was a challenge for the staff, as many tech companies had gone out of business or had become part of large conglomerates over the years.

Staff sought out 1980s artwork from antique stores, thrift shops, and online; works with legible artist signatures were submitted to a clearing company, which attempted to obtain approvals from the artists or their estates to use the works on screen. Some art vendors had the artists' contact information, allowing the buyers to deal with them directly. The production designers also rented pieces from local galleries that were able to sign releases on the artists' behalves. Near the end of the first season, Totten began using a local vendor called Elk Creative to digitally create custom paintings in the style of 1970s and 1980s mass-produced corporate art.

Freilich said that the early 1980s fashion was "a little bland, a beige time", and that as a result, vintage clothing stores did not carry much merchandise from the period. The wardrobe department ultimately obtained many articles of clothing from shops and rental houses in Los Angeles where inventory was more extensive.

=== Music ===
According to Freilich, AMC budgeted $40,000 per episode for music. The amount was often insufficient to license even one song, which necessitated the staff finding ways to cut costs in other departments of production to allow it to be redirected to music.

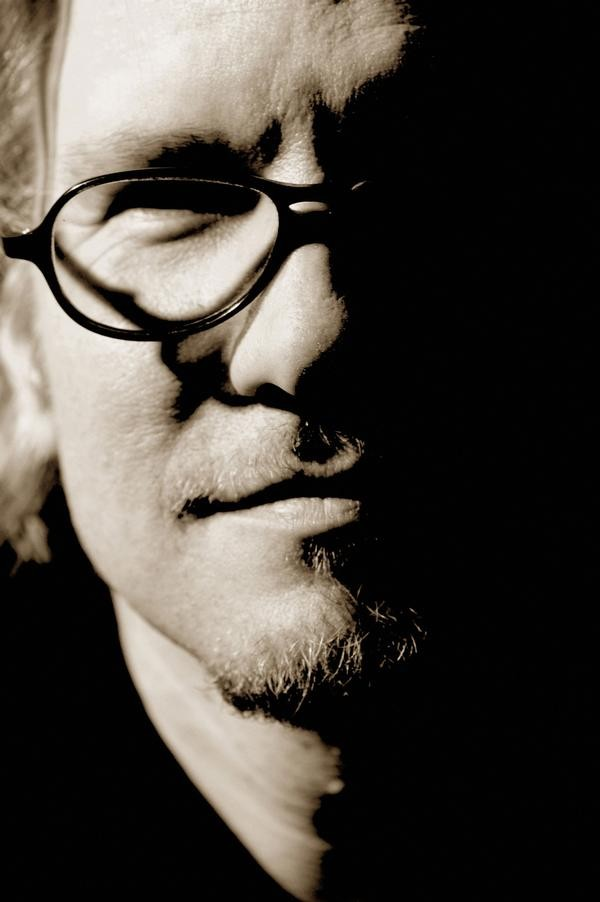
Austrian musician Paul Haslinger, formerly of Tangerine Dream, composed the series's electronic original score.

The original score was composed by Austrian musician Paul Haslinger, formerly of German electronic music group Tangerine Dream from 1986 to 1990. He secured the position on the series through his connection to its music supervisor, his friend Thomas Golubić. Having previously recorded music during the 1980s, Haslinger was drawn to Halt and Catch Fire as a second chance to write for the decade. Rather than merely revive 1980s music, he instead wanted to draw from its moodiness, and to combine his favorite retro sounds with modern-day elements. Haslinger's score was electronic, making heavy use of synthesizers; he used his original equipment and samples as well as virtual instruments, creating a blend of "analog and digital sounds from that era and [his] own sound design". He eschewed explicit musical themes for each character to avoid sounding "hokey". Instead, he tried to write for the subtext or underlying tension of scenes. Starting with the third season, Haslinger strove to pare down his compositions, often starting with fifteen tracks of audio before scaling down to five. He also incorporated more influences from beyond the 1980s, such as the works of Giorgio Moroder. A compilation of tracks from the first three seasons was released on CD and vinyl through Lakeshore Records on September 16, 2016. A second volume followed on vinyl, CD, and digital services on April 5, 2019.

Golubić and his team at the firm SuperMusicVision handled music licensing, creating a soundtrack of album-oriented rock, college rock, new wave, and 1980s punk. Golubić said that his team sought to license lesser-known tracks, believing the use of obvious 1980s hits would be "kitschy" and not within the series's budget; explaining their approach, he said, "We want to immerse people in that time period, not distract them". The music supervisors were engaged by the writers early in their creative process in an attempt to better integrate music into the series. Golubić and his team started by compiling playlists of songs that were evocative of the show's period setting, before attempting to secure licensing deals. They also curated playlists for each of the main characters after discussing them and their backstories. Golubić said of the process, "This is how we informed ourselves of the world that the characters live in." The playlists were sent to the actors to help them prepare for their roles, and were used by the producers, writers, and editors as a reference for developing the story. Joe was seen as a "futurist looking forward" embodied by acts ahead of their time such as Gary Numan, the Cars, and Wire, Gordon was interpreted as someone whose musical tastes did not evolve past 1970s acts such as Steely Dan and Boz Scaggs due to his preoccupation with work. AMC partnered with music streaming service Spotify to share the character playlists online and to promote them on amctv.com and the network's "Story Sync" second screen platform.

Punk rock played a prominent role in the characterization of Cameron, frequently playing through her headphones on screen or non-diegetically to represent her temperament as a rebellious loner. The scene in which she enters the Cardiff Electric offices for her first day of work is soundtracked by the Clash's "The Magnificent Seven", whose lyrics about the "futility of the capitalist grind underscor[e] her ambivalence about the job", according to Pitchfork's Judy Berman. After Cameron founds Mutiny, the company offices are frequently heard playing punk, post-punk, and alternative rock, which Berman said represented Cameron's growing influence in the tech industry. Towards the end of the series, punk music is used in the characterization of the Clarks' teenage daughters. The rebellious, troublemaking Joanie enjoys Shonen Knife, and Haley listens to PJ Harvey and riot grrrl bands while coming to terms with being queer.

Among the tracks licensed for use in the series were "Red Eyes" by the War on Drugs, "Velouria" by Pixies, "So Far Away" by Dire Straits, a cover of Joy Division's "She's Lost Control" by the Raveonettes, "Mercy Street" by Peter Gabriel, and in the closing sequence of the series finale, Gabriel's "Solsbury Hill".

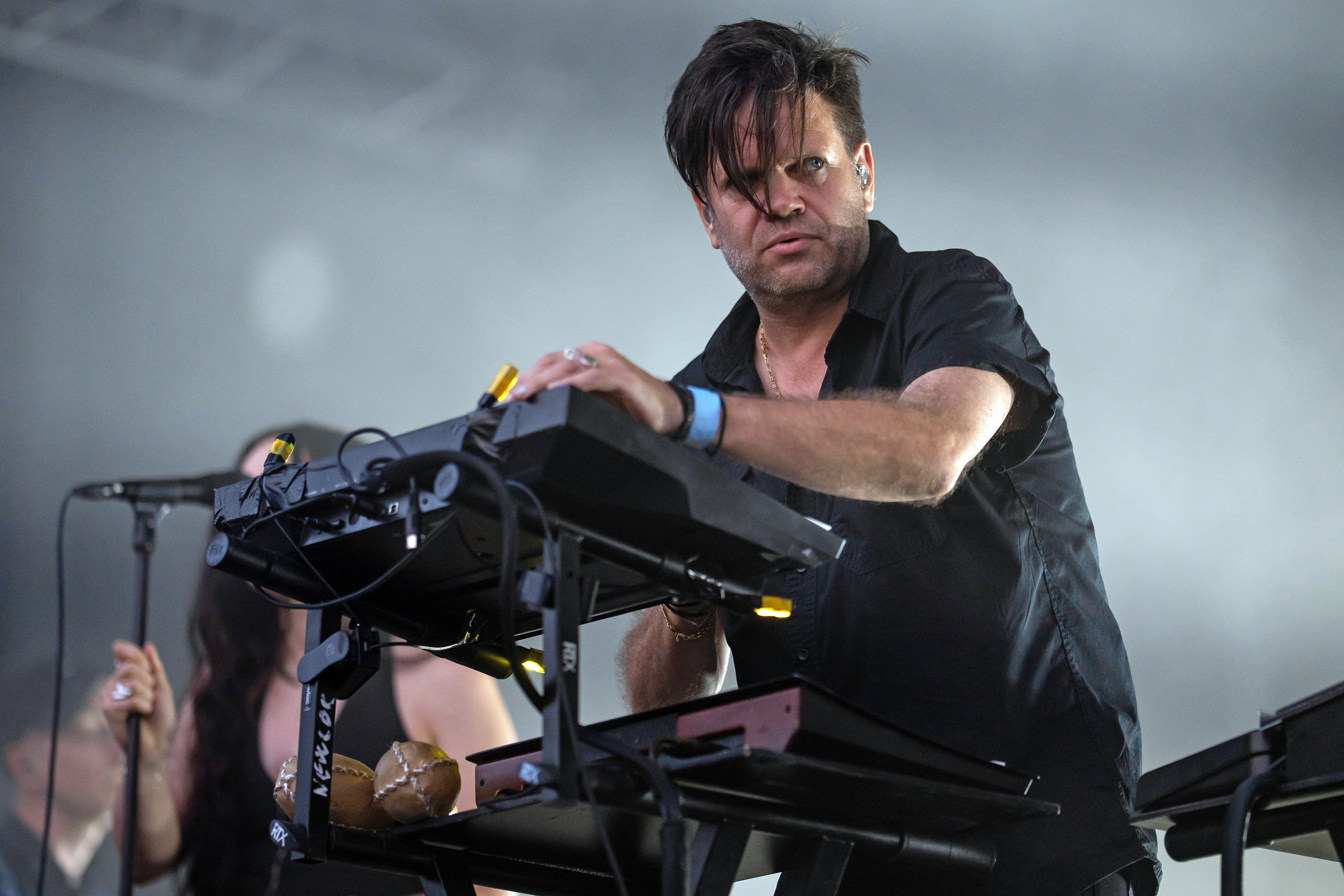
Danish musician Anders Trentemøller composed the opening theme.

The opening theme was composed by Danish musician Anders Trentemøller. After the series's producers attended a concert of his in Los Angeles, they asked him to compose an electronic music theme that had the same tempo and mood as his song "Still on Fire". Raoul Marks, lead animator of the opening credits, described the theme as "straddl[ing] the line between contemporary electronica and more retro-analog" sounds.

=== Title sequence ===
The opening title sequence was created by the design studio Elastic, with creative direction from Antibody. The sequence depicts an electrical signal racing across a neon-red digital landscape, leaving a trail as it travels. Along the way it passes digitally distressed images of the main cast members, before it completes its journey to light up an LED indicator. Marks said the signal was depicted "allegorically to illustrate the competing forces driving young tech entrepreneurs towards a new technological dawn".

The animators were tasked with creating an "abstract and symbolic" sequence "about the computer era that was about people, not machines". The sequence evolved from the animators' initial pitch to the showrunners to depict the "birth of an idea". The artists' first inspiration was to show a lightbulb turning on, a common visual metaphor for a "bright idea", and consequently they sought to show the journey of a signal to light up the bulb. During the extended storyboarding process, art director Eddy Herringson toyed with geometric shapes inspired by Saul Bass art, retro video games, and sex education films; sequence director Patrick Clair said the team "bounced between digital sperm to missile command and back—all in 8-bit." After several iterations, they replaced the lightbulb with an LED indicator to better evoke the computer era. In the initial pitch, the artists depicted competing signals that ended up disintegrating or being left behind, but these elements were scaled back. The team took artistic license with the appearance of electric and digital signals in the sequence. Due to the need to show the signal in a state of constant motion from shot to shot, precise animation and cuts between shots were required. Serif fonts were used for the credits and were inspired by the mature, classical typography and conservative layout design of personal computing advertisements from the 1980s. The color scheme, inspired by high-saturation 4-bit color computer graphics, was dominated by an "iridescent red that never peaked beyond hot magenta".

To give the title sequence a human element, images of the main cast members were incorporated. Rather than show "beauty shots" of the actors, the animators heavily edited images of them in a glitch art style. Marks "de-rezzed" the character images with Adobe Photoshop by selecting rectangular sections and using the software's average color feature on each; Marks said the process gave each portrait an "interesting facial approximation". Afterwards, the images were built into 3D models, although the artists did not want a "fully immersive 3D scene" but rather one that still had "more depth than just a graphic". Since the series's story was about "people putting pressure on themselves, and risking self-destruction through their own ambition", the artists wanted to depict them "decaying, breaking under the pressure of velocity and self-destruction". They achieved this by streaking debris, digital artifacts, and facial details away from the portraits in horizontal lines; Marks likened the effect to a person "re-entering the atmosphere from orbit but in a digital world".

== Series synopsis ==
Season	Episodes	Originally released	
Season	Episodes	First released	Last released
1	10	June 1, 2014	August 3, 2014
2	10	May 31, 2015	August 2, 2015
3	10	August 21, 2016	October 11, 2016
4	10	August 19, 2017	October 14, 2017

=== First season (2014) ===
In 1983, Joe MacMillan joins Cardiff Electric, where he enlists the help of Gordon Clark to reverse engineer the BIOS of an IBM PC and reconstruct its assembly language code. Company owner Nathan Cardiff and vice president John Bosworth confront the two when the company is sued by IBM for copyright infringement. Joe reveals that he told IBM about the project, forcing Cardiff Electric to legitimize it and enter the personal computing business. Joe heads the project to build an IBM clone, with Gordon leading the hardware team. Needing a software engineer, Joe recruits Cameron Howe to write the BIOS in a "clean room". For their PC, ultimately named the "Cardiff Giant", Joe's goal is for it to be twice the speed at half the cost of IBM's PC, but much of the company does not buy into his vision or trust him. He further alienates himself from Cardiff and Bosworth after IBM aggressively undercuts Cardiff Electric and forces them into layoffs, and after Joe upsets a potential investor.

Despite her suspicions of Joe, Cameron begins an on-again, off-again relationship with him. Gordon's wife, Donna, is wary of his involvement in the project, but she eventually contributes to it, first by giving Gordon her idea for a double-sided printed circuit board, and then by recovering lost data from Cameron's computer (a data loss event faked by Joe). Gordon brokers a deal for discounted liquid crystal displays through a family connection. After finishing the BIOS, Cameron is promoted to head of the software engineering team and designs a user-friendly operating system (OS) intended to draw in the user. Joe's ex-lover Simon, an industrial designer, designs the case for the PC. Initially hesitant about the project, Bosworth comes around but is denied further funding by Cardiff. With Cameron's help, Bosworth embezzles money to sustain the project but is arrested as the company office is raided by the FBI. Having smuggled out the Giant prototype, Gordon convinces the others to proceed with their plan to present at the COMDEX trade show.

At COMDEX, the team discover the "Slingshot", a copycat of the Giant, being presented by the Clarks' neighbor (a former Cardiff Electric employee) and Donna's former manager from Texas Instruments (TI). In order to undercut the Slingshot and make the Giant commercially viable, Gordon removes Cameron's OS and the supporting hardware. When Joe supports the decision, a heartbroken Cameron leaves him. Joe and Gordon present the downgraded Giant at COMDEX and secure their first order, but it is a hollow victory for the team. After witnessing a demonstration of the Apple Macintosh at the conference, Joe becomes disillusioned with the Giant. Cameron quits Cardiff Electric and poaches most of the software engineers to form an online gaming startup company called Mutiny. After Donna leaves TI, she accepts an offer from Cameron to join Mutiny. The Cardiff Electric team celebrates the completion of the Giant, but Joe sets fire to the truck containing the first shipment and disappears, leaving Gordon to run the company.

=== Second season (2015) ===
Cardiff Electric is sold to a conglomerate in 1985, earning Gordon a six-figure payment but Joe nothing. Eager to start anew, Joe gets engaged to his girlfriend Sara and goes to work at Westgroup Energy, an oil firm where her father, Jacob Wheeler, is CEO. Starting in data entry, Joe spots an opportunity to use their mainframe computers for time-sharing and takes over the department. Meanwhile, Donna and Cameron are chaotically running Mutiny in a rented house with their developers. Cameron hires a paroled Bosworth to be a manager, as well as one of Mutiny's subscribers, Tom, to be a game designer; she and Tom begin dating. Gordon writes a computer program, "Sonaris", intended to map Mutiny's network, but it inadvertently acts as malware. To make up for his mistake, Gordon negotiates an arrangement with Joe for Mutiny to be Westgroup's first time-sharing client at a discount in exchange for Gordon configuring the mainframes. Mutiny subsequently thrives, due in part to their new "Community" chat rooms conceived by Donna. Preoccupied with work, Donna keeps an abortion secret from Gordon, and he hides his toxic encephalopathy diagnosis from her.

At Jacob's request, Joe raises Mutiny's rates, much to Cameron's chagrin, but Donna and Joe negotiate a compromise contingent on Mutiny meeting certain benchmarks. One of them is porting their software to the AT&T UNIX PC, which they unsuccessfully fake during a demo for Joe. Impressed by their ingenuity, Joe convinces Jacob to make an acquisition offer to Mutiny, but after realizing Jacob would corrupt the startup's vision, Joe convinces Cameron to reject it. He decides to quit Westgroup and after marrying Sara, plans to move them to California. Gordon admits his medical diagnosis to Donna and begins stress therapy after his condition worsens following the failure of his homebuilt computer business. Tom and Cameron create a first-person shooter game, but on the night of its planned launch, Westgroup replaces Mutiny's service on their network with a copycat, "WestNet". Joe denies involvement, but the Mutiny staff disbelieve him. Cameron and Donna sell their game to sustain the company, causing Tom to break up with Cameron and quit Mutiny. Cameron emotionally manipulates Joe in order to run the Sonaris malware on a Westgroup computer, crippling their network during Joe's presentation of WestNet at a shareholders meeting.

Sara annuls her marriage to Joe, while Jacob is scapegoated for the WestNet fiasco and fired. After Gordon admits to an affair, Donna gives him an ultimatum: he must purchase and renovate a mainframe in California for Mutiny, move their family there with the company, and take a job with them; he agrees. Having transitioned from games to an online community, Mutiny departs for California. Gordon writes Joe an antivirus program in hopes of helping Westgroup, but Joe uses it instead to pitch a venture capitalist. He invites Gordon to join the endeavor but is refused. Gordon is furious to learn later that Joe has received $10 million in funding for a new company in the San Francisco Bay Area called MacMillan Utility.

=== Third season (2016) ===
In 1986, Mutiny launches its mainframe and surpasses 100,000 users. Gordon is involved in a copyright infringement lawsuit against Joe. After noticing that Mutiny's chat feature is facilitating user-to-user transactions, Donna and Cameron are inspired to build an online trading feature and begin pitching venture capitalists. One of them, Diane Gould, helps Mutiny acquire a competitor, Swap Meet. Underappreciated Mutiny programmer Ryan Ray quits, and after being inspired by Joe's presentation of MacMillan Utility's no-cost antivirus software, Citadel, he convinces Joe to hire him.

The Swap Meet–Mutiny merger causes friction, as Cameron is resistant to making her code compatible with Swap Meet's and wants to fire their founders. Ryan is disconcerted to learn MacMillan Utility plans to charge users for Citadel. To keep it free, Joe enlists Ryan in a special project to find another revenue stream. After Ryan maps the ARPANET, they spot potential in the NSFNET, a backbone network not yet approved for commercial use. The two build their own regional network at MacMillan Utility, but after spending millions of the company's money and making a handshake deal with the NSFNET in defiance of the company's board of directors, Joe is stripped of his executive powers. As a result, he declares in a deposition that he stole Citadel from Gordon.

Cameron's and Donna's relationship deteriorates; Cameron unilaterally fires the Swap Meet founders, and the women clash on how to implement credit card transactions and whether to undertake an initial public offering (IPO) after receiving a $20 million acquisition offer. Cameron wants to delay the IPO to continue developing Mutiny but is outvoted by Donna, Diane, Bosworth, and Gordon; feeling betrayed, she leaves the company and decides to move to Japan with Tom after they reconcile and marry. The Mutiny IPO dramatically underperforms expectations. Gordon and Joe preserve the NSFNET deal with Gordon heading MacMillan Utility. After Ryan illegally releases Citadel's source code and becomes a fugitive from the FBI, Joe steps away from the project to keep it alive. Months later, Ryan shows up at Joe's apartment and is dismayed to learn his legal options. The next morning, Joe discovers that Ryan has killed himself; his suicide note warns how people will use the connectedness of computer networks to hurt each other.

By 1990, Mutiny has folded. The Clarks are amicably divorced. Donna is a partner at Diane's VC firm, while Gordon is running the regional network. Joe is working in his apartment. Bosworth is retired and living with Diane. Cameron is a successful video game developer for Atari. While promoting her game Space Bike IV at COMDEX, she reconnects with Joe and sleeps with him. They, along with Donna, Gordon, and Tom, meet at the former Mutiny office to discuss Donna's memo about the fledgling World Wide Web. Joe proposes building a web browser, and everyone but Tom is receptive; he and Joe have a physical altercation, halting the meetings. Cameron tells Donna she cannot work with her; Donna grudgingly leaves as Gordon, Joe, and Cameron prepare to start their new venture.

=== Fourth season (2017) ===
Over three years, Gordon and Joe run the internet service provider (ISP) CalNect, and Joe logs website URLs. Working from Japan, Cameron fails to complete a web browser for them before they are beaten to market by Mosaic. When CalNect's backbone provider MCI declines to offer them more bandwidth, Gordon and Joe realize MCI is forming its own ISP and sell CalNect. Cameron's cerebral role-playing game, Pilgrim, performs poorly in focus groups and is put on hold by Atari after a negative review. While visiting California, she tells Joe that Tom is divorcing her; she and Joe rekindle a romance. At the VC firm AGGEK, Donna sets up an incubator for a medical database indexing company called Rover to pivot them into web indexing. In debt, Bosworth unretires to oversee the project.

After Gordon's teenage daughter Haley builds a website from Joe's directory of URLs, they form a new startup called Comet to develop it into a human-curated web directory. Donna is surprised to learn her daughter is working on a competing search engine. As Comet grows, Rover's algorithm proves substandard; Bosworth approaches Cameron to ask for help improving the algorithm, which she obliges. Rover's sudden success results in Series A funding but Donna is suspicious. During her ensuing argument with Bosworth about the subject, he suffers a heart attack. At the hospital, Donna realizes Cameron's involvement and tells her to stay out of her life. Cameron admits to Joe her role in helping his competition.

Facing an intellectual property ownership conflict, Donna fires Rover's head programmer but refuses to purchase the rights to Cameron's algorithm, leading to Diane removing her from the project; Cameron signs away the algorithm without compensation. A financier, Alexa, provides Cameron with funding to work independently. When Haley's school grades begin slipping, Gordon tells her she must take time off from Comet, leading to her storming out. Bosworth admits to Diane that he is in debt; the two marry. After Donna opines on the importance of retaining visitors to their sites longer, Gordon is inspired to relaunch Comet as a web portal, which Joe excitedly agrees to. Before they can begin, Gordon dies from a stroke. His friends and family gather to grieve and clean out his house; Cameron and Donna reconcile.

Months later, while preparing for the relaunch of Comet, Joe and Cameron receive a beta copy of the yet-to-be released browser Netscape Navigator. They discover a link to Yahoo! on its toolbar as the default search provider and realize that Comet is doomed. After one final night together, they break up. Joe sells Comet, and AGGEK sells Rover's algorithm. Diane retires and is succeeded at the firm by Donna, who renames it "Symphonic Ventures" and revamps their work culture. Cameron ends her professional relationship with Alexa. Preparing to leave California, Cameron stops at Donna's house to say goodbye but stays to try to recover Haley's school project from her crashed hard drive. Donna and Cameron discuss the prospect of working together again. Later that evening, Donna hosts a cocktail party for women in tech before visiting the former Mutiny office with Cameron. The following morning, as they leave a diner, Donna has an epiphany and tells Cameron, "I have an idea". Joe returns home to Armonk, New York, to become a humanities teacher.

== Themes ==
=== Failure and reinvention ===
Cantwell and Rogers wanted Halt and Catch Fire to explore what it meant to be considered a success or a failure. Rogers said they were interested in the pejorative connotation that the term "loser" carries in American culture, and they sought to redefine how success could be measured beyond binary terms to give their characters more humanity. By the final season, the characters realize "everything isn't about one singular victory professionally or personally". The creators wanted to tell the stories of unsung innovators, since, as Cantwell put it, historical narratives tended to overlook the "millions of people in obscurity who did most of the heavy lifting, only to have somebody step in and get the credit". He said that they intended the series's fictional characters and companies to "exist plausibly within the cracks of history", but since the series follows historical reality, the protagonists are predestined to lose out to real-life competitors. Although the characters prosper financially and attain professional accomplishments, they never find lasting success or transform their industry like they set out to. Describing how their protagonists were fated to fail, Cantwell said, "We know that our characters are not going to be the ones with the Wikipedia articles written about them, but what's fun about our story is, we can somehow still get excited about their excitement, because they're in the fog of war and they don't know what's coming."

In response to their failures, the characters are forced to undergo transformations, both personal and professional. Cantwell called reinvention a major theme of the series, saying: "tech is about failing fast and changing quickly. That felt like it gave us license to do that." Laura Hudson of Wired said, "The cycle of passion, loss of control, and hard reboot runs through not just every business endeavor but nearly every relationship on the show." Regarding the unsuccessful ventures and a failed marriage depicted on the show, she said, "It's easy to call these failures, but they're more like iterations in the lifelong experiment of trial and error that people hope can lead them closer to what they really want, and closer to themselves." Poniewozik, writing for The New York Times, said the series "was more interested in failure as a condition of human growth" and that from its perspective, failure "is not the end; it's how people level up."

=== Interpersonal relationships and ambition ===
The characters' professional ambitions frequently result in them making decisions at the expense of their personal relationships. David Sims of The Atlantic said, "[The characters'] conflicts often hinge on their struggles to communicate—which is made all the more ironic by the fact that they're laying the groundwork for a world where everyone can speak to each other instantly, despite being more polarized than ever." Lisco said a "seminal theme" of the show was "the euphoria and the cost of going after your dreams in life". Chris Cabin of Collider called the series one in which "connections are often compromised in the name of ambition and vision". Vanity Fair's Laura Bradley said that as each of the series's characters "followed their ambitions, competing ruthlessly to get to an unseen top of the food chain", they alternated between collaborating and "stabb[ing] each other in the back".

In the pilot episode, Joe tells Gordon: "Computers aren't the thing. They're the thing that gets us to the thing". Many critics found it to be a defining phrase of the series, highlighting how technology is ultimately less important than the connections it can forge between people. Philip Cosores of Consequence of Sound compared the phrase to a lesson he believed the characters had learned: "that it wasn't really important what they created or what they innovated. What was important was that it brought them together over and over again, and that they all made each other better." Joe Reid of Decider said that the characters' stories illustrated that "their successes, their failures, and their might-have-been regrets were never, in the end, as important as the mere fact that they made the decision to work together in the first place". Hudson said that the series's most "radical message" was that "Human beings are the signal, and everything else is just noise."

=== Feminism ===
The series explores themes of feminism, sexism, and gender roles. Rogers said that the creators were able to "examine modern issues through a period lens" by depicting sexism in the 1980s that was still present 30 years later. Through Cameron's and Donna's professional experiences in computing, the series delves into how people in leadership positions can be perceived differently based on their gender. Emily St. James of Vox said: "Every decision anybody makes is driven, on some level, by emotion. But when the person making that decision is a woman in the workplace, on Halt and Catch Fire, as in life, it's all too easy to write off that decision for being 'emotional.'" In the second season, the creators placed Cameron and Donna into situations similar to ones that Joe and Gordon faced in the first season, as they wanted to contrast the other characters' distrust of the female partnership with their reactions to the male one. According to Cantwell, the 1980s were a time when computers were being marketed as "toys for boys" at the expense of appealing to women; Bishé, an advocate of women entering STEM fields, said that the proportion of women who received computer science degrees had declined in the years following the series's period setting (37 percent in 1984, compared to 18 percent in 2012). Cantwell and Rogers were interested in exploring how the computing industry began to slowly push women out in the mid-1980s, and they depicted it through Cameron's and Donna's encounters with sexist behavior of male venture capitalists.

Cantwell and Rogers were annoyed by the common trope of women being accessories to male storylines in television dramas, and wanted Cameron and Donna to be "formidable engineers and formidable people in their own right". Though both feminists, the characters have different values due to their ten-year age difference; Donna has an unentitled view of feminism due to the struggles her generation went through, while Cameron fails to "recognize her own femaleness" and takes for granted the benefits she enjoys due to the efforts of Donna's generation. Davis said that Donna and Cameron represented the stories of second- and third-wave feminism, respectively. The depiction of their business partnership was regarded by critics as easily passing the Bechdel test, which measures female representation in fiction.

== Distribution ==
=== Premiere and initial broadcast ===
The pilot was screened at the South by Southwest festival on March 8, 2014. Apple co-founder Steve Wozniak moderated a panel discussion with Cantwell and Rogers at the festival, and called the pilot "very realistic". From May 19–31, the pilot was available to stream on AMC's Tumblr page and AMC.com, and through video on demand and TV Everywhere services; it was marketed as the first TV series to premiere on Tumblr and the first time AMC had partnered with a social media service to debut a new show. In the two weeks before its television premiere, the episode received "hundreds of thousands of plays", according to AMC president Charlie Collier. The network held private screenings of the pilot for employees of technology companies such as Apple, Twitter, Google, and Dropbox, as well as for Tumblr "influencers" at the company's New York headquarters. A premiere was held at the ArcLight Hollywood theatre in Los Angeles on May 21.

The series made its television debut on Sunday, June 1, 2014, in the 10 p.m. ET timeslot, replacing Mad Men, whose mid-season finale had aired the week prior for its final season. The pilot episode of Halt and Catch Fire was the only one distributed to critics for review, an uncommon practice for new series, which usually make multiple episodes available upon premiering.

Season two premiered on May 31, 2015, and concluded on August 2.

Prior to the third season's official two-hour premiere on Tuesday, August 23, 2016, AMC aired the season's first episode early on Sunday, August 21, at 11 p.m. ET, in the second half of a two-hour timeslot that had been allocated to Talking Dead.

AMC renewed Halt and Catch Fire for a fourth and final season of ten episodes on October 10, 2016. The final season began with a two-hour premiere on August 19, 2017, and concluded with a two-hour series finale on October 14.

=== International distribution ===
Halt and Catch Fire was distributed internationally by eOne Television as one of the first series covered by a 2013 agreement with AMC to distribute the network's original scripted programming. The distributor licensed the series to Canal+ in France; C More in Denmark, Norway, Sweden, and Finland; HBO Nordic in Scandinavia; TV 2 in Norway; and D.B.S Satellite Services in Israel. In August 2014, AMC announced that the series would be among the network's first original series to air on their recently rebranded international TV channels in Asia, Europe, and Latin America. The series premiered in Singapore in March 2015. That same month, the CBS AMC Networks EMEA Channels Partnership, a joint venture between AMC Networks International Zone and CBS Studios International, announced that the series would be broadcast in Poland on CBS Europa starting April 12; this marked the first time that CBS Europa would air first-run content. Halt and Catch Fire premiered in Australia on June 23, 2015, on Showcase.

=== Home media and streaming ===
The first season was released on DVD (region 1) and Blu-ray (region A) on May 5, 2015. The second season was released on DVD in region 1 on August 9, 2016.

Season one was made available on AMC On Demand and AMC.com from March 26 to April 7, 2015, before its release on Netflix on April 8. It was also made available on Amazon Video in the UK and Germany. In December 2017, the final season was released on Netflix, making the entire series available on the service. On May 1, 2020, a licensing deal between AMC and ViacomCBS took effect to make Pluto TV the exclusive no-cost, ad-supported streaming partner for older AMC content; Halt and Catch Fire was one of the network's series covered by the agreement. In September 2020, AMC announced an agreement with ad-supported streaming service IMDb TV to offer the network's programming; Halt and Catch Fire was one of several original series planned for a dedicated channel called "AMC: Presents". A similar "AMC Presents" ad-supported channel, featuring network content such as Halt and Catch Fire, was announced for the Samsung TV Plus streaming service in December 2020, and for Plex's "Live TV" streaming in March 2021. All four seasons of the show became available for streaming on SBS On Demand in Australia in June 2021. After departing Netflix in December 2021, the series was added to the AMC+ streaming service with the release of each full season over successive weeks. In June 2025, all four seasons of the series were added to the ITVX streaming service in the UK.

== Reception ==
=== Critical response ===
Season	Critical response	
Season	Rotten Tomatoes	Metacritic
1	76% (49 reviews)	69 (31 reviews)
2	91% (23 reviews)	73 (8 reviews)
3	96% (23 reviews)	83 (12 reviews)
4	100% (26 reviews)	92 (8 reviews)

==== First season ====
The first season received favorable reviews from critics. At Metacritic, which assigns a rating out of 100 to reviews from mainstream publications, the first season received an average score of 69, based on 31 reviews. According to review aggregator Rotten Tomatoes, the first season holds a 76% approval rating with an average score of 7.2/10, based on 49 reviews; the site's consensus said, "A refreshingly well-acted period drama, Halt and Catch Fire convincingly portrays the not-too-distant past." Reviewing the pilot, Matthew Gilbert of The Boston Globe was intrigued by the possibility that the series would "be able to delve beneath the surface of its milieu". He highlighted the "distinctive visual style", focus on "material that has not already been done to death elsewhere on TV", and the "pair of unfamiliar and interesting lead actors". Tim Goodman of The Hollywood Reporter called the opening episode a "triumphant pilot with excellent writing, impressive acting and a noteworthy cinematic visual style". Although skeptical about how the show would evolve, Goodman said, "It's a premise with possibilities and could be AMC's best offering of the post-classics (Breaking Bad, Mad Men) era." Mary McNamara of the Los Angeles Times said that although the pilot "doesn't hit the gloriously high bar set by the opening episode of Mad Men, it is provocative and promising nonetheless."

Reviewing several episodes, Chris Cabin of Slant Magazine said "the show's creators choose to tailor the series to focus on the enigmatic MacMillan, which might explain why Halt and Catch Fire comes off as overtly coy and more than a little aimless". The review called the show "a hungry anticipation for what machines can and will do, but it only has a cursory interest in the complex humans that built them." Alan Sepinwall of HitFix believed the series was derivative of others and analogized this assessment to the show's plotline of reverse engineering the IBM PC, calling Halt and Catch Fire "a series that has not only been reverse-engineered from past cable drama hits, but that seems acutely aware of that fact." Emily St. James of The A.V. Club echoed these sentiments, writing that the pilot "feels like the network trying to reverse engineer... its success with Mad Men". St. James, though, said that "the pilot moves with a kind of confidence that's hard to fake" and praised Campanella's "intriguing direction". Joanne Ostrow of The Denver Post called it a "dreary imitation" of Mad Men in which "the brooding, secretive loner guy was a tad too familiar, yet not as moving as that earlier slick-suited version". She liked the stories of the male leads and the progression of the female characters but said that "Pace's excellent performance was not enough to make the show rewarding". Colin McGuire of PopMatters said that the season was "not perfect" and accurately reflected that it had been written by two newcomers to television. He noted, however, the "worthwhile cast that did far more than enough to bring the occasionally spotty narrative to life" and said, "The groundwork for something special is there, imperfections and all."

==== Second season ====
The second season received strong reviews, with many critics noting the series's improvement over its first season. At Metacritic, the season received an average review score of 73 out of 100, based on 8 reviews. According to Rotten Tomatoes, the second season holds a 91% approval rating with an average score of 8.3/10, based on 23 reviews; the site's critical consensus said, "Halt and Catch Fire version 2.0 has received some upgrades and improvements, including a welcome focus on its female leads." Sepinwall praised the acting, writing, and directing of season two, and noted that one of his frustrations with the first season, the downplaying of Donna and Cameron, was resolved: "Now it's essentially Halt and Catch Fire 2.0, with all the bugs worked out so that it can function exactly as it first promised." Sepinwall summed up the season's changes by saying, "Those who stayed patient with Halt season 1, or those who come to the show now that the quality has gone up significantly, will be rewarded." Andy Greenwald of Grantland called season two a "hard reboot" that was exponentially better. He praised the emphasis placed on the female leads, Davis's performance, and how it reframed the male leads, while noting that the focus on Mutiny "inject[ed] the show with the jittery, caffeinated energy of a start-up". Willa Paskin of Slate said that the series was able to successfully pivot by shifting focus to a startup setting and to Cameron and Donna, the latter of whom Paskin said "has blossomed into a character with ambitions all her own". Commenting on the season's exploration of issues facing working women, Paskin wrote, "what is so satisfying about its treatment of sexism... is not the extent to which the sexism conforms to our expectations, but that the women involved do not." Emily Nussbaum of The New Yorker called season two "such a startling upgrade of the first that it begs for technological metaphors". She said that the chemistry between Donna and Cameron "is looser, releasing the show from the burdens of its gloomy forerunners", and that the marriage between Gordon and Donna felt nuanced. Nussbaum said the series was best at being "a platform for a fascinating, buried period of history" that provided "oddly profound meditations on the nature of originality in the digital age, nested within relationship talk". James Poniewozik of Time said the show "remade and refocused itself in its second season" by focusing on the Cameron–Donna partnership and that "it now has a compelling subject". Poniewozik said, "true to Moore's Law, it has become magnitudes better."

==== Third season ====
The third season received critical acclaim. At Metacritic, the season has an average review score of 83 out of 100, based on 12 reviews, indicating "universal acclaim". According to Rotten Tomatoes, the third season holds a 96% approval rating with an average score of 8.6/10, based on 23 reviews; the site's critical consensus said, "Halt and Catch Fire finds its footing in an optimistic third season that builds on the fascinating relationship between a pair of emerging protagonists." David Sims of The Atlantic said Halt and Catch Fire was "one of TV's most elegantly crafted shows", "the best drama on television", and the most underrated. Sims praised the series for creating emotional investment in the characters' ideas, for its depiction of teamwork and the act of creation, and for using "[Joe] MacMillan to satirize the Jobsian cult of personality that defines so much of the tech world". St. James, writing for Vox, said, "This is the rare recent TV drama that's both as good as it is and as optimistic as it is." She praised Cantwell and Rogers for continued character development and highlighted the series for leading the movement of what she called "empathy dramas". Daniel Fienberg of The Hollywood Reporter called out the Donna–Cameron partnership as the highlight of the show, writing, "There's nothing like it on TV." He praised the lead actors' performances and the nuanced characters, and called Halt and Catch Fire "one of TV's best-directed shows". Maureen Ryan of Variety called the series "both a retro pleasure and a forward-looking gem" that was bolstered by its performances, soundtrack, and individual episode story arcs. Ryan said the characters' failed attempts to connect with each other resonated because of the series's "compassionate approach to its core characters". Jen Chaney of Vulture said the third season "covers familiar thematic ground while remaining a very good period piece that traces the rise of digital technology and simultaneously uses it as a metaphor to explore its characters' frailties". Chaney said the series earned its "should-watch status" through its cast, use of restraint, and depiction of characters on the verge of technological breakthroughs. Poniewozik, writing for The New York Times, said the season "makes its past future feel dewy and new" and that despite some initial slow pacing, "The character dynamics are solid... and the '80s details continue to be spot on." Hank Stuever of The Washington Post said, "The show's bugs and glitches also persist, but, if nothing else, Halt and Catch Fire has become an above-average specimen of 'slow television,' should you want such a thing in your life." The review said that the season "survives—and arguably thrives" on the Donna–Cameron storyline, but that it still struggled with Joe's character.

==== Fourth season ====
The fourth season received critical acclaim, and the strongest reviews of any season of the series. At Metacritic, the season has an average review score of 92 out of 100, based on 8 reviews. According to Rotten Tomatoes, the fourth season holds a 100% approval rating with an average score of 9.5/10, based on 26 reviews; the site's critical consensus said, "Halt and Catch Fire's character-driven drama culminates in an optimistic ode to the early internet age that's bound to stand the test of time." Michael Roffman of Consequence of Sound called the fourth season "a victory lap for everyone who championed the show from the very beginning". He said the series's refusal to guarantee the characters' success "doesn't just make for great television, but great characters, and those characters are partly why Halt has staved off its own demise." Jeff Jensen of Entertainment Weekly said the show had overcome "a sputtering start to become a luminous drama", praising Cantwell and Rogers for progressing "from aping the antihero playbook to refining it" and for making "incredibly compelling and unique" characters. He concluded his review by calling the series "an urgent story of rehumanization for a cold, wired culture". Eric Thurm of The Verge called the show "the best depiction of technological innovation on television", lauding the "truly formidable" cast and the show's visual style for "charg[ing] meetings, coding sessions, or a group of people standing in front of a whiteboard with creative potential". St. James commended the series's ability to create nostalgia for the early days of the Web and said it was one of the few dramas that was able to "stay nimble and sharp" by "find[ing] endless new iterations of the characters it already has". In her end-of-year rankings of the best series, St. James said the season's final four episodes "were as emotionally overwhelming as anything [she's] ever seen on television". J.M. Suarez of PopMatters said the season "never sacrifices nuance and thoughtfulness for twists or attempts to outdo itself," calling the show "confident enough to let its characters succeed and fail without having to spell out who's right and wrong". Sims said the fourth season "succeeds by making its tech narrative not a dry history lesson, but rather a battle of wills between four very flawed, compelling characters, each possessed of the kinds of manic ambition and tendency toward self-destruction that make for the best television drama". Alex Cranz of Gizmodo called the fourth season "easily one of the best seasons of a television show ever produced", while Brian Grubb of Uproxx similarly called it "one of the best seasons of television [he's] ever seen".

==== Critics' end-of-year lists ====
According to Metacritic, Halt and Catch Fire's fourth season was the 17th-highest-ranked series of 2017, based on critics' end-of-year lists.

Select year-end rankings of Halt and Catch Fire
Year	Publication (critic)	List	Rank	Ref.
2015	Slate	The Top 10 TV Shows of 2015	1	
2015	RogerEbert.com	The Best TV of 2015	5	
2015	Vox	Best TV shows 2015	8	
2015	Rolling Stone	25 Best TV Shows of 2015	23	
2015	The Atlantic	The Best Television Shows of 2015	Shortlisted	
2015	The New York Times (James Poniewozik)	The Best TV Shows of 2015	Shortlisted	
2016	Vox	Best TV shows 2016	1	
2016	Slate (Willa Paskin, June Thomas)	The Top 10 TV Shows of 2016	3	
2016	Consequence of Sound	Top 25 TV Shows of 2016	4	
2016	Variety (Sonia Saraiya)	20 Best TV Shows of 2016	4	
2016	The A.V. Club	The best TV of 2016	6	
2016	The Ringer	The Best TV Shows of 2016	7	
2016	The Hollywood Reporter (Daniel Fienberg)	The Best TV of 2016	9	
2016	Paste	The 25 Best TV Shows of 2016	10	
2016	The Atlantic	The Best Television Shows of 2016	Shortlisted	
2017	Consequence of Sound	Top 25 TV Shows of 2017	2	
2017	The Hollywood Reporter (Daniel Fienberg)	The 10 Best TV Shows of 2017	2	
2017	Uproxx (Alan Sepinwall)	The 20 Best TV Shows Of 2017	3	
2017	Variety (Sonya Saraiya)	The Best TV Shows of 2017	3	
2017	RogerEbert.com (Brian Tallerico)	The Best TV Shows of 2017	3	
2017	TVLine	10 Best Drama Series of 2017	4	
2017	The A.V. Club	20 best TV shows of 2017	5	
2017	Forbes	The Best of Television 2017	5	
2017	Slate	The 10 Best TV Shows of 2017	5	
2017	Vulture (Jen Chaney)	10 Best TV Shows of 2017	5	
2017	The Oregonian	10 Best TV Shows of 2017	6	
2017	IndieWire	The Top 10 TV Shows of 2017	7	
2017	The Ringer	The Best TV Shows of 2017	7	
2017	Paste	The 25 Best TV Shows of 2017	9	
2017	Rolling Stone	20 Best TV Shows of 2017	13	
2017	The Guardian	The 50 best TV shows of 2017	39	
2017	The New York Times	The Best TV Shows of 2017	Shortlisted	
2017	The Atlantic	The 20 Best TV Shows of 2017	Shortlisted	
2017	Vox	The 18 best TV shows of 2017	Shortlisted	
2017	The Philadelphia Inquirer	Best of 2017 – Television	Shortlisted	

=== Viewership ratings ===
The premiere episode drew 1.2 million viewers according to Nielsen data, 433,000 of them in the 18–49 age demographic. At the time, it was the least-watched drama series premiere in AMC's modern history, and was the only episode of the series to surpass one million viewers during its initial broadcast. The first season drew modest overall viewership, averaging 760,000 viewers per episode, and a 0.3 rating in the 18–49 age demographic for live plus same-day viewings. When accounting for time shifting via digital video recorders (DVRs), the season averaged 1.3 million viewers per episode in live plus 7-day viewings; 606,000 of them were ages 18–49, making Halt and Catch Fire among the "most upscale dramas on ad-supported television" behind Mad Men and The Good Wife, according to AMC. Despite the low overall ratings, the network renewed the show in August 2014 for a second season of ten episodes. AMC's president Charlie Collier said, "We have a history of demonstrating patience through the early seasons of new shows, betting on talent and building audience over time."

The second-season premiere drew 659,000 viewers, 262,000 of whom were ages 18–49. Compared to the first-season premiere, this marked a 45% drop in overall viewership and a 39% drop in the 18–49 demographic. The season finale was watched by 485,000 viewers. Despite the critical acclaim that season two garnered, viewership declined overall. The season averaged 520,000 viewers per episode and a 0.2 rating in the 18–49 age demographic in live plus same-day viewings. When accounting for time shifting, the season averaged 865,000 viewers per episode in live plus 3-day viewings and just under one million in live plus 7-day viewings. Still, AMC renewed the series in October 2015 for a ten-episode third season. Stillerman said, "The critical momentum was a big part of the decision." The Tuesday premiere of the third season drew just 385,000 same-day viewers.

Halt and Catch Fire : U.S. viewers per episode (thousands)

Season	Episode number										Average
Season	1	2	3	4	5	6	7	8	9	10	Average
1	1190	970	765	844	575	718	832	627	549	574	764
2	659	494	452	451	543	558	499	497	588	485	523
3	367	339	397	312	324	280	307	366	407	287	339
4	340	340	270	344	313	354	322	327	394	394	340

Audience measurement performed by Nielsen Media Research

=== Awards and nominations ===
Halt and Catch Fire never won a Primetime Emmy Award, receiving only a nomination for Outstanding Main Title Design. It is regarded as one of the greatest shows to never win an Emmy. The series won two awards: Most Exciting New Series at the 4th Critics' Choice Television Awards in 2014, and the Drama Series award at the Women's Image Network Awards in 2018. The series was nominated for a Peabody Award in the entertainment category in 2018.

Year	Award	Category	Nominee(s)	Result	Ref.
2014	Satellite Awards	Best Television Series – Drama	Halt and Catch Fire	Nominated	
2014	Satellite Awards	Best Actor – Television Series Drama	Lee Pace	Nominated	
2014	Critics' Choice Television Awards	Most Exciting New Series	Halt and Catch Fire	Won	
2015	Casting Society of America's Artios Awards	Outstanding Achievement in Casting – Television Pilot – Drama	Sharon Bialy; Sherry Thomas; Lisa Mae Fincannon (location casting); Craig Fincannon (location casting); Allison Bader (associate); Jen Ingulli (associate)	Nominated	
2015	Primetime Emmy Awards	Outstanding Main Title Design	Patrick Clair (creative director); Raoul Marks (animator); Eddy Herringson (designer); Paul Sangwoo Kim (typographer); AMC	Nominated	
2015	SXSW Film Design Awards	Excellence in Title Design	Patrick Clair	Nominated	
2015	Hollywood Post Alliance Awards	Outstanding Sound – Television	Susan Cahill (supervising sound editor); Keith Rogers (re-recording mixer); Scott Weber (re-recording mixer); Jane Boegel (dialogue editor); Mark Cleary (sound effects editor); Kevin McCullough (sound effects editor); NBC Universal Studio Post; for episode: "SETI"	Nominated	
2017	Guild of Music Supervisors Awards	Best Music Supervision in a Television Drama	Thomas Golubić; Yvette Metoyer; for season 3	Nominated	
2018	Motion Picture Sound Editors Golden Reel Awards	Outstanding Achievement in Sound Editing – Dialogue and ADR for Episodic Short Form Broadcast Media	Susan Cahill (supervising sound editor); Sara Bencivenga (supervising ADR editor); Jane Boegel (dialogue editor); for episode: "So It Goes"	Nominated	
2018	Peabody Awards	Entertainment honoree	AMC Studios; Gran Via Productions; for Halt and Catch Fire	Nominated	
2018	Women's Image Network Awards	Actress Drama Series	Kerry Bishé	Nominated	
2018	Women's Image Network Awards	Drama Series	Halt and Catch Fire for episode: "NeXT"	Won	
2019	Guild of Music Supervisors Awards	Best Music Supervision in a Television Drama	Thomas Golubić; Yvette Metoyer; for season 4	Nominated	

=== Legacy ===
Halt and Catch Fire appeared on several rankings of 21st century television series. Thrillist called it the best TV series to air all of its episodes in the 2010s; writer Esther Zuckerman said: "perhaps more than any other show that began during this decade, Halt and Catch Fire captured the agony of trying to navigate a world where it's easier and easier to hide behind a computer screen. In documenting the beginning of the boom that brought us to where we are, [Cantwell and Rogers] created characters who reflected universal anxieties through their longing." Emily St. James of Vox ranked it 5th on her list of the shows that best explained the 2010s, saying the series "had the power to transport viewers back to a world where computers could unite people rather than divide them, where the internet held promise and not destruction. The show's most beautiful optimism was that we might be able to return to that world someday." Time named it one of their top 10 TV series of the 2010s, saying, "In the past decade, as we've suffered the consequences of a tech sector that can seem devoid of human insight and empathy, Halt dared to imagine an alternate history of the industry in which those qualities mattered most." The Hollywood Reporter ranked it the 7th-best TV series of the decade, with Daniel Fienberg saying of it: "Driven by a commitment to character, Halt and Catch Fire gained more and more emotional heft with each passing season and every tear I shed in the final three or four episodes felt completely earned." Consequence of Sound ranked the series 10th on their list of the decade's best; Michael Roffman said, "As [the characters] endured, so did the show, and that bizarre negotiation of fiction and reality certainly elevated our feelings towards the characters and the series." Brian Tallerico of RogerEbert.com, which placed the series 12th on its list of the decade's best, called it "one of the best character studies of the decade" and said "no show was smarter than this one when it comes to chronicling what success (and failure) does to personal relationships".

In its critical assessment of 2010s television, Vulture included Halt and Catch Fire in its section of "Indisputable Classics" and said, "Observant, replete with unexpected and great soundtrack choices, and blessed with four lead actors... who made every scene sing, Halt and Catch Fire was never flashy, and that made it a rare, special creation." The show was ranked 14th on IndieWire's list of the best TV shows of the 2010s; Libby Hill said that it dissected how "friends, lovers, and partners find ways to build things and, too often, tear them apart". Rolling Stone placed the series 18th on its list of the decade's 50 best TV shows; Alan Sepinwall said that "Halt quickly left the knockoff accusations behind and transformed into its own incredibly moving story" after it emphasized the Donna and Cameron characters and made "their partnership the series' emotional centerpiece". USA Today ranked it the 24th-best series of the decade, saying, "No TV show earns the most-improved award more than 'Halt'", while opining that it "found its voice" once it focused on the friendship between Cameron and Donna. The A.V. Club ranked the series 29th on its list of the 100 best shows of the decade, saying that it was in "the pantheon of great but underseen series that'll hopefully find greater appreciation years after the fact". Halt and Catch Fire also appeared on end-of-decade lists of the best TV shows published by Uproxx, Collider, and Paste.

In 2022, Rolling Stone placed Halt and Catch Fire 55th on its revised list of "The 100 Greatest TV Shows of All Time"; the list was compiled from 46 ballots submitted by actors, writers, producers, and critics. The Hollywood Reporter's 2023 list of the 50 greatest shows of the 21st century ranked the series in 17th place, highlighting the final season for paying off the "three previous seasons of deep emotional investment". In 2021, BBC Culture ranked Halt and Catch Fire 50th on its list of the 100 greatest TV series of the 21st century; the list was based on a poll of 206 TV experts, comprising critics, journalists, and industry figures from 43 countries. The Guardian and The New York Times also included Halt and Catch Fire on their lists of the 100 best TV shows of the century, ranking it 79th and 96th, respectively.

Two fourth-season episodes were ranked among the best TV episodes of the 2010s; BuzzFeed News included "Goodwill" on its list of the top 25 episodes, and Film School Rejects ranked "Ten of Swords" 23rd on its list of the top 50.

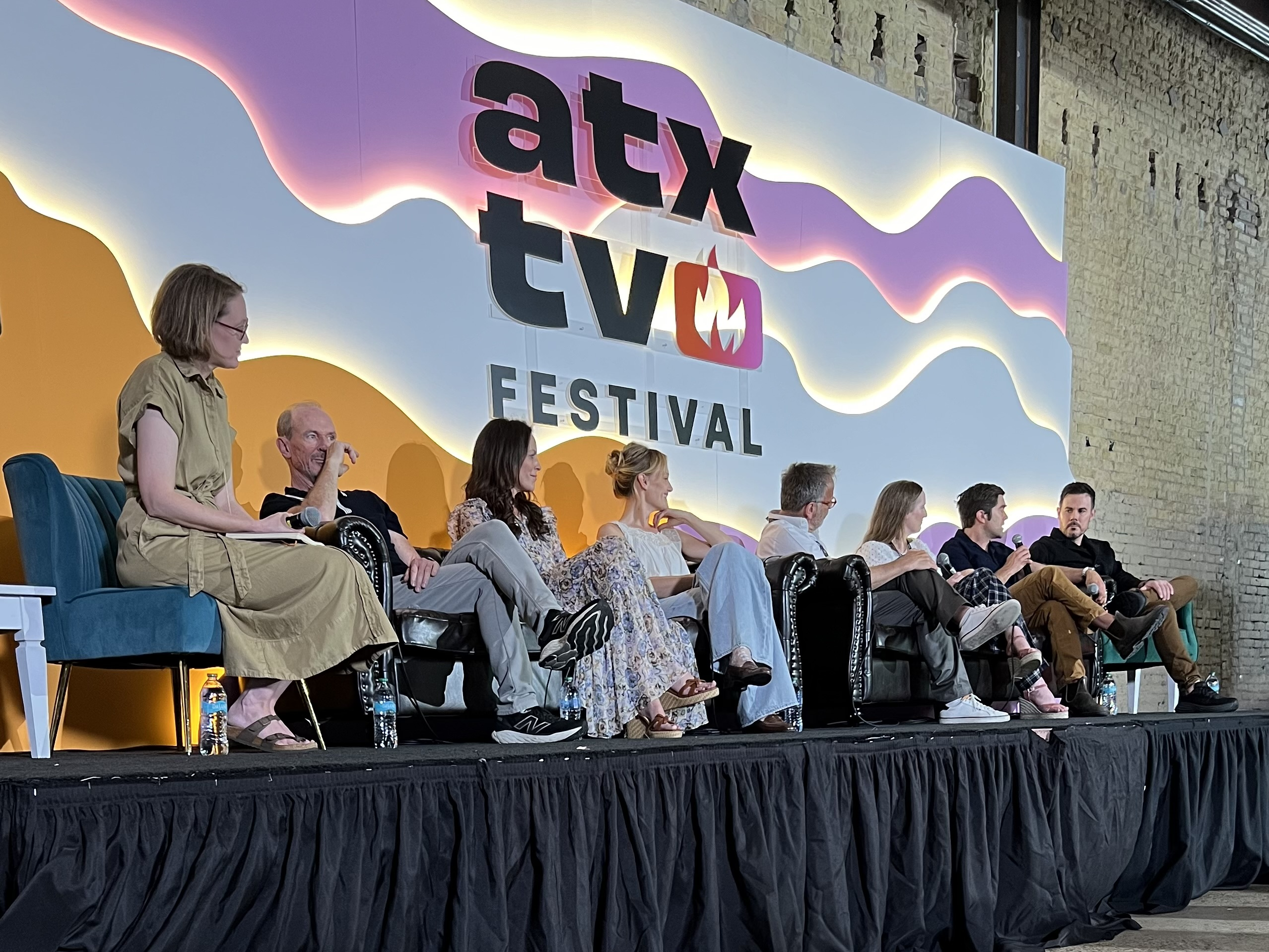
Cast members and producers from the series reunited at the 2024 ATX TV Festival for a 10th anniversary panel.

In 2024, the ATX TV Festival hosted a panel discussion to commemorate the 10th anniversary of Halt and Catch Fire's premiere, with the producers and cast members as participants.
