= The Nudist on the Late Shift =

- Author: Po Bronson
- Language: English
- Publisher: Random House
- Publication date: 1999
- Publication place: United States
- Pages: 248 pp (hardcover edition)
- ISBN: 0-375-50277-7
- OCLC: 40444457
- Dewey Decimal: 338.4/7004/0979473 21
- LC Class: HD9696.2.U63 C353 1999

The Nudist on the Late Shift and Other True Tales of Silicon Valley is a book by Po Bronson.

== See also ==
- The First $20 Million Is Always the Hardest
