= The First $20 Million Is Always the Hardest =

- Theatrical release poster
- Directed by: Mick Jackson
- Screenplay by: Jon Favreau; Gary Tieche
- Based on: The First $20 Million Is Always the Hardest by Po Bronson
- Produced by: Trevor Albert
- Starring: Adam Garcia; Rosario Dawson; Jake Busey; Enrico Colantoni; Ethan Suplee; Anjul Nigam
- Cinematography: Ronald Víctor García
- Edited by: Don Brochu
- Music by: Marco Beltrami
- Distributed by: 20th Century Fox
- Release date: June 28, 2002
- Running time: 105 minutes
- Country: United States
- Language: English
- Budget: $17 million
- Box office: $5,491

The First $20 Million Is Always the Hardest is a 2002 film based on the novel of the same name by technology-culture writer Po Bronson. The film stars Adam Garcia and Rosario Dawson. The screenplay was written by Jon Favreau and Gary Tieche.

== Plot ==
Andy Kasper is a marketer who quits his job for something more fulfilling. He gets hired at LaHonda Research Institute, where Francis Benoit assigns him to design the PC99, a $99 PC. He moves into a run-down boarding house where he meets his neighbor Alisa, an artist. He puts together a team of unassigned LaHonda employees. The team includes: Salman Fard, a short, foreign man with an accent who is hacking into CIA files when Andy meets him; Curtis "Tiny" Russell, a massively obese, anthropophobic man; and Darrell, a tall, blond, pierced, scary, germaphobic, deep-voiced man with personal space issues who regularly refers to himself in the third person.

The team finds many non-essential parts, but cannot reach the $99 mark. It is Salman's idea to put all the software on the internet, eliminating the need for a hard drive, RAM, a CD-ROM drive, a floppy drive, and anything that holds information. The computer has been reduced to a microprocessor, a monitor, a mouse, a keyboard, and the internet, but it is still too expensive. Having seen the rest of his team watching a hologram of an attractive lady the day before, in a dream Andy is inspired to eliminate the monitor in favor of the cheaper holographic projector. The last few hundred dollars come off when Darrell suggests using virtual reality gloves instead of a mouse and keyboard. Tiny then writes a "hypnotizer" code to link the gloves, the projector, and the internet, and they're done.

But immediately before he finishes, the whole team (except for Tiny, who is still writing the code) quits LaHonda after being told that there are no more funds for their project, but sign a non-exclusive patent waiver, meaning that LaHonda will share the patent rights to any technology they had developed up to that point. After leaving LaHonda, they pitch their product to numerous companies, but do not get accepted, mainly because the prototype emagi (electronic magic) was ugly, and something always seemed to go wrong during the demonstration of their product.

Alisa, whose relationship with Andy has been growing steadily, helps improve the emagi's looks, which allows the team to have their callback with an executive. They agreed to give her 51% of their company in exchange for getting their product manufactured and for getting Andy's Porsche bought back, which he had to sell to raise money to build a new emagi after leaving LaHonda. Unfortunately, she then sells the patent rights to the emagi to Francis Benoit, who plans to sell the emagi at $999 a piece and reap a huge profit.

The team interrupts the meeting in which Benoit will introduce the emagi to the world. It introduces an even newer computer that he and his team developed and manufactured at LaHonda, which was in a state of disaster when they arrived. It was a small silver tube that projected a hologram and lasers which would detect where the hands were, eliminating the need even for virtual reality gloves. Andy then reminds Benoit of the non-exclusive patent waiver, which had been Benoit's idea in the first place.

== Cast ==
- Adam Garcia as Andy Kasper
- Rosario Dawson as Alisa
- Anjul Nigam as Salman Fard
- Ethan Suplee as Curtis "Tiny" Russell
- Jake Busey as Darrell
- Enrico Colantoni as Francis Benoit
- Gregory Jbara as Hank
- Dan Butler as Lloyd
- Linda Hart as Mrs. 'B'
- Shiva Rose as Torso
- Chandra West as Robin
- Rob Benedict as Willy
- Heather Paige Kent as Claudia Goss
- John Rothman as Ben
- Reggie Lee as Suit

== Reception ==
=== Box office ===
The film's opening Weekend Gross was $2,535 in USA (30 June 2002).

The feature film had limited release in New York and Los Angeles. Its domestic gross was just $5,491, making it one of the greatest flops in movie history.

=== Critical response ===
On the review aggregator website Rotten Tomatoes, 11% of 9 critics' reviews are positive, with an average rating of 3/10. Metacritic, which uses a weighted average, assigned the film a score of 20 out of 100, based on 4 critics, indicating "generally unfavorable" reviews.
