= Po Bronson =

American journalist and author

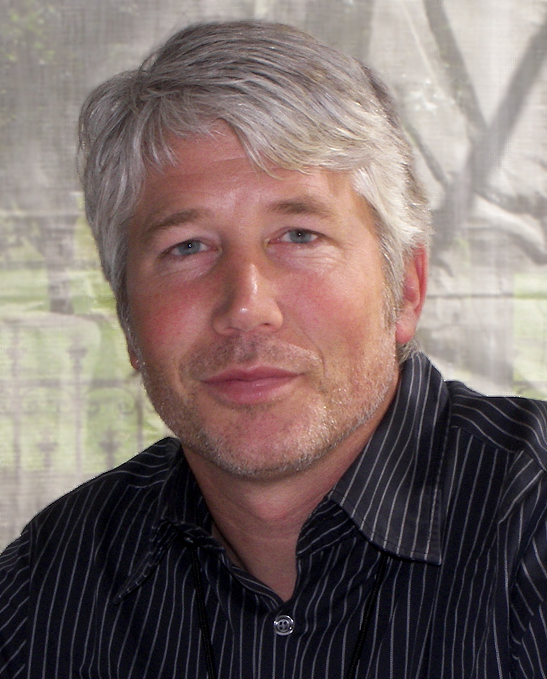
- Bronson at 2009 Texas Book Festival
- Education: Lakeside School; Stanford University
- Occupations: Journalist and author

Po Bronson is an American journalist and author who lives in San Francisco.

== Early life and education ==
After attending Lakeside School in Seattle, Bronson graduated from Stanford University in 1986, and briefly worked as an assistant bond salesman in San Francisco.

== Career ==
Bronson abandoned finance to pursue writing, publishing short stories and eventually a comedic novel based upon his bond trading experiences. This first novel, Bombardiers (1995), was an international bestseller. Publishers Weekly reviewed the book saying, "Bronson writes with panache, and while his novel finally lacks the depth of feeling that can distinguish a great satire like Catch-22, it's a witty and cutting send-up that marks him as a writer with a likely big and bright future."

Bronson went on to write articles for The New York Times Magazine and others, but perhaps became best known for his work in Wired magazine and other technology-related publications.

Then, during the rise of the internet/high tech in the late 1990s, Bronson became a leading chronicler of Silicon Valley in its heyday, writing two more best sellers. The first, The First $20 Million Is Always the Hardest, was a novel sending up technology start-ups. The second, The Nudist on the Late Shift, was a nonfiction portrayal of those who had followed the modern-day gold rush to Silicon Valley.

With the collapse of the internet bubble in 2000, and after creating The $treet, a short-lived television drama for Fox again drawing upon his bond trading days, Bronson began searching for a new direction for his career. Realizing he was not alone in this quest, he began to focus on others in similar quandaries. Bronson spent the next two years working on a new nonfiction book, What Should I Do with My Life? which profiles about 50 people, exploring how each had confronted the question. The hardcover release of the book was a New York Times No. 1 bestseller. It remained on the bestseller list for 22 weeks, and a dozen more in paperback.

Bronson's follow-up to What Should I Do with My Life? is Why Do I Love These People? For that book, Bronson spent three years researching and interviewing over 700 families. The book tells the stories of about 20 people who have had extraordinary experiences with their families.

Partly as a result of the research Bronson did for these two books, he became a columnist for TIME online. His columns frequently draw on his research data to challenge arguments that American society is on a moral decline. For example, he argues against the idea that the institution of marriage has disintegrated from an ideal past filled with stable nuclear families. He also argues that most young adults who live with their parents are not slackers, but are working, attending school, and volunteering full-time.

With co-author Ashley Merryman, he released a book in September 2009 entitled NurtureShock: New Thinking About Children. The book discusses theories and scientific aspects of parenting.

in 2015, Po joined Attention Span Media, a strategy consulting firm, as Futurist / Contributing Editor, where he worked on the "Future of Sports" and "Future of Medicine" projects.

In August 2018, Po joined IndieBio as Strategy Director.

== Published works ==
- Bombardiers (1995)
- The First $20 Million Is Always the Hardest (1997)
- The Nudist on the Late Shift (1999)
- What Should I Do with My Life? (2002)
- Why Do I Love These People? (2005)
- NurtureShock: New Thinking About Children (2009) (with Ashley Merryman) ISBN 978-0-446-50412-6
- 642 Things to Write About (2012)
- Top Dog: The Science of Winning and Losing (2013) (with Ashley Merryman) ISBN 978-1455515158
- Future of Sports (2015)
- Future of Sports 2.0 (2016)
- Future of Medicine (2017)

== Film adaptation ==
A film loosely based on his second novel, entitled The First $20 Million Is Always the Hardest, was released in 2002. It cost almost $20 million to make but was released only in two theaters, then sent to DVD. The script was written by Jon Favreau.
