= Christopher Rogers =

Christopher Rogers may refer to:

- Christopher John Rogers, American fashion designer
- Christopher C. Rogers, American film and television writer and producer
- Christopher Columbus Rogers (1846–1888), Texan marshal and gunfighter

== See also ==
- Chris Rogers (disambiguation)
- Christopher Rodgers (disambiguation)
