= List of Halt and Catch Fire episodes =

Halt and Catch Fire is an American period drama television series created by Christopher Cantwell and Christopher C. Rogers, that aired on AMC from June 1, 2014, to October 14, 2017. The series depicts a fictionalized insider's view of the personal computer revolution of the 1980s and later the growth of the World Wide Web in the early 1990s. The series' first two seasons are set in the Silicon Prairie of Dallas–Fort Worth, while the third and fourth seasons are set in Silicon Valley. The show's title refers to computer assembly language instruction HCF, whose execution would cause the computer's central processing unit to stop working (and facetiously catch fire).

During the course of the series, 40 episodes of Halt and Catch Fire aired over four seasons, between June 1, 2014, and October 14, 2017.

== Series overview ==
Season	Episodes	Originally released	
Season	Episodes	First released	Last released
1	10	June 1, 2014	August 3, 2014
2	10	May 31, 2015	August 2, 2015
3	10	August 21, 2016	October 11, 2016
4	10	August 19, 2017	October 14, 2017

== Episodes ==
=== Season 1 (2014) ===
No. overall	No. in season	Title	Directed by	Written by	Original release date	U.S. viewers (millions)
1	1	"I/O"	Juan José Campanella	Christopher Cantwell & Christopher C. Rogers	June 1, 2014	1.19
In 1983, Joe MacMillan, a key player in the debut of the IBM Personal Computer, questions college students about their knowledge of several computing categories; one of the students, Cameron Howe, challenges him. Joe is hired as a sales executive at Cardiff Electric, a Dallas-based mainframe software company, by vice president John Bosworth. Joe came to Cardiff to recruit sales engineer Gordon Clark into reverse engineering an IBM PC with him after reading an article Gordon wrote in BYTE on the topic of open architecture. Gordon is initially reluctant to undertake the project, as he suffered a public humiliation when the Symphonic, a microcomputer he and his wife Donna created, failed to boot at COMDEX in 1981. Gordon reconsiders Joe's proposal and successfully reconstructs the assembly language source code of the IBM PC's ROM BIOS. Bosworth and company owner Nathan Cardiff confront Joe and Gordon, informing them that Cardiff Electric is being sued for copyright infringement by IBM; Joe reveals that he deliberately told IBM about the project, and Cardiff Electric is forced to enter the PC business. Needing a programmer with no prior connections to Cardiff or IBM, Joe and Gordon recruit Cameron for the project.
2	2	"FUD"	Juan José Campanella	Christopher Cantwell & Christopher C. Rogers	June 8, 2014	0.970
Joe reveals his plans for Cardiff Electric's new PC compatible by building it with twice the speed at half the cost of the original; Gordon argues that the idea is infeasible while Cameron dismisses it as boring. Joe is then introduced as "Senior Product Manager" of Cardiff Electric's new PC division. Joe sets up a "clean room" office so Cameron can write the BIOS code for the new PC. Gordon is promoted to head hardware engineer of the PC project. Gordon shows concern about Cameron writing the BIOS code, and Joe tells him that they will fire her once the BIOS code is complete and successfully tested. To put pressure on Cardiff Electric, IBM aggressively undercuts Cardiff's business, taking more than two-thirds of Cardiff's revenue and attempts to lure Cameron away by offering her triple her salary; Joe's former boss also unsuccessfully tries to persuade him to return to IBM. At night, Joe, Gordon, and Cameron confront each other in the Cardiff parking lot and have a three-way argument with Joe and Gordon getting into a physical altercation. Despite tension among the three, Gordon and Cameron eventually come to support Joe's vision.
3	3	"High Plains Hardware"	Karyn Kusama	Jason Cahill	June 15, 2014	0.765
After IBM's poaching of Cardiff Electric, Gordon is forced to lay off several employees. Joe tells the remaining engineers that the company will have a portable PC weighing less than 15 pounds by the end of the year. After Joe attempts to secure venture capital from his East Coast contacts, Nathan tells him that Bosworth will handle the project's finances going forward; Nathan then arranges a meeting with one of his local business partners, an heiress named Louise “LouLu” Lutherford. During a dinner party, LouLu offers $10 million in exchange for an 80 percent stake in the PC project. Dissatisfied with the low offer and her attitude, Joe deliberately sinks the deal by seducing LouLu's boyfriend. Gordon attempts to come up with innovative ways to meet Joe's design goals; Donna suggests using a doubled-sided printed circuit board. However, one of the engineers keeps nixing Gordon's ideas without suggesting any alternatives, and Gordon fires him. After cashing her first paycheck, Cameron stays in a hotel; however, she later goes to Joe's apartment after she struggles with the code.
4	4	"Close to the Metal"	Johan Renck	Jonathan Lisco	June 22, 2014	0.844
Just as Cameron nears completion of the BIOS code for the new PC, disaster strikes, and she loses all her data. Further complicating the situation, Joe has brought in a reporter from a major business periodical, and he witnesses the chaos with delight. Bosworth is summoned to a meeting by Nathan, who believes that Bosworth might be losing control of the project to Joe. Gordon turns to Donna for help with recovering the lost BIOS code; however, Joe is reluctant to have her there, as she is an engineer for Texas Instruments. She proposes an ingenious technical solution for recovering the data, which eventually proves successful, recovering more than 90 percent of Cameron's work. A suspicious Donna later confronts Joe in his office and accuses him of deliberately sabotaging Cameron's work in order to generate publicity for the project. Joe reaches into a desk drawer and produces the real backup disks, proving her correct. While driving home, Joe is pulled over by the police, beaten and arrested for no apparent reason; however, when Bosworth bails him out, Joe realizes that it was a message to remind him that Bosworth was still in charge.
5	5	"Adventure"	Ed Bianchi	Dahvi Waller	June 29, 2014	0.575
Joe hires a new software development team. To meet one of the design goals for the new PC, Gordon realizes that a liquid crystal display would be needed; Gordon reveals that his father in-law, Gary Emerson, has connections with Japanese electronics manufacturer Kuzoku and could procure the displays at a discount. Cameron clashes with Joe over his recent hire, arguing that adding programmers to the project will delay it. Joe's father, Joe MacMillan, Sr., comes to Dallas to visit his son; however, Joe stands him up. Joe Sr. later confronts Cameron, warning her about Joe's volatile past. After Gary reluctantly agrees to broker the meeting with Kuzoku, Gordon promptly blows the deal by making drunken comments about his father in-law. Joe goes to the Kuzoku executives the next day in an attempt to salvage the deal and to apologize on Gordon's behalf; however, Gordon reveals that Gary had already intervened. Cameron installs Colossal Cave Adventure on the company mainframe as a test to find which programmers are the most valuable to the project. Impressed with her ingenuity, Joe makes Cameron the software manager, and she fires the extra programmers.
6	6	"Landfall"	Larysa Kondracki	Zack Whedon	July 6, 2014	0.718
The prototype computer is finally finished, and boots up successfully. Cameron proposes changes to the operating system's user interface to make it more user-friendly. Both Gordon and Joe reject her idea, stating that any radical changes to the computer would be more difficult to sell. Hoping to ease the tension between them, Gordon invites Joe over to his house for dinner. After the programmers get frustrated with receiving conflicting orders from both Cameron and Gordon, Bosworth calls Cameron into his office; he cautions her to be careful, as there are those who would like to see her fail, as she "represents the future". When Joe arrives at the Clark household, Gordon isn't home yet, as he had earlier made a promise to Donna that he would find Cabbage Patch Kids for their daughters, a task made more difficult with Hurricane Alicia battering Dallas. Joe must then endure two boisterous children as well as Donna's lobbying on Gordon's behalf for there to be no further changes to the new computer. While playing with the kids, Joe has second thoughts about Cameron's OS; he stops off to see Cameron on his way home, and asks to see her work.
7	7	"Giant"	Jon Amiel	Jamie Pachino	July 13, 2014	0.832 (Note: Denotes individual program numbers were not available so AMC's primetime average is listed.)
Bosworth learns that Cardiff Electric is on the verge of bankruptcy. During a QA meeting, the engineers complain that Cameron's OS has negatively impacted the computer's performance. Joe introduces renowned industrial designer Simon Church and his designs for the Cardiff PC case; Joe also reveals the PC's name, the “Contrail”. Gordon voices his disapproval; he argues that the case design is impractical and facetiously suggests that the computer should be called the “Cardiff Giant”. Donna accompanies her boss, Hunt Whitmarsh, on a business trip to meet with TI executives to discuss the fate of the TI-99/4A; during the trip, Donna inappropriately flirts with Hunt, which causes her embarrassment. After a failed attempt to hire a local industrial designer, Joe goes to a photography exhibit to try to get Simon to reconsider, and he finds Cameron there trying to do the same; Joe reveals to Cameron that he and Simon had a brief relationship 10 years ago. When Bosworth asks Nathan for a bridge loan to keep the PC project afloat, Nathan refuses, stating that he's ready to cut his losses. Before he leaves, Simon reveals to Joe that he has AIDS, but agrees to design Cardiff's case.
8	8	"The 214s"	Daisy von Scherler Mayer	Dahvi Waller & Zack Whedon	July 20, 2014	0.627
As Cardiff Electric makes preparations for COMDEX, the FBI raids the office and arrests Bosworth for embezzlement. To prevent the Giant prototype from being seized as evidence, Gordon hastily disassembles the computer and later smuggles its components out of the office. At TI, Donna learns that Hunt had abruptly resigned. After Gordon accuses Joe of framing Bosworth, Cameron reveals that she was the one, at Bosworth's behest, who hacked the bank's mainframe. When Gordon tells Donna that Cardiff Electric was shut down, she contemplates leaving him, but reconsiders after seeing the Giant. While attempting to get orders for the Giant ahead of COMDEX, Joe learns of a rumor that IBM is building their own portable PC, and he flies to New York City to confront his father over professional and personal matters. When Joe returns to Dallas, he informs Gordon and Cameron that he intends to return to IBM. Gordon persuades Joe into seeing the Giant project through; however, Joe reveals that he doesn't have the money to go to COMDEX. After Cameron convinces Joe to sell his Porsche to fund their trip, the three and Donna drive to Las Vegas in the Clarks' station wagon.
9	9	"Up Helly Aa"	Terry McDonough	Jason Cahill	July 27, 2014	0.549
When the Cardiff Electric team arrives in Las Vegas, they learn that their reservations had been cancelled due to the company's corporate assets being frozen. After the team manages to secure a suite and a booth by unorthodox means, Donna and Gordon discover that the Giant is malfunctioning; however, they get it repaired after Joe distracts the attendees with booth babes during the would-be demo. The next day, the team notices a large gathering at a particular booth; they then realize that Donna's former boss Hunt along with Gordon's ex-engineer were marketing a knockoff of the Giant called the Slingshot. At their suite, Gordon accuses Donna of having an affair with Hunt, which led to the creation of the Slingshot. Joe realizes that the Slingshot is faster and cheaper than the Giant, and Gordon removes Cameron's OS in response. Cameron is upset over Gordon's actions; however, Joe has to side with Gordon for the sake of survival. Joe successfully pitches the downgraded Giant during the on-floor presentation, securing a large order from a computer retailer. As Cardiff celebrates their hollow victory, Joe stumbles upon the demonstration of the Apple Macintosh, seeing it as the IBM PC-killer he envisioned.
10	10	"1984"	Juan José Campanella	Christopher Cantwell & Christopher C. Rogers	August 3, 2014	0.574
After COMDEX, Joe and Gordon manage to convince Nathan into giving them operational control of the company as well as minority ownership. Donna severs her ties with TI after she deliberately tanks her performance review. While testing the first production run of Giants, the engineers discover a defective test unit. Now fixated on the Macintosh, Joe tasks the programmers with creating a killer application to bundle with the Giant. After Gordon suspects that Joe had engineered another crisis, Donna tells Gordon that he must force Joe out of the company; Gordon plans to do so by threatening to turn Cameron over to the FBI for her role in embezzling Cardiff's money. After parting ways with Joe and Cardiff Electric, Cameron creates her own startup company called Mutiny to host online games, recruiting most of Cardiff's programming team. With no programmers left, Joe drops his plans for a killer app, and Gordon too drops his plan to oust Joe. Gordon holds an office party to celebrate the launch of the Giant. Later, Gordon invites Donna to work as head engineer at Cardiff Electric; however, she declines, deciding to join Cameron at Mutiny. Gordon is left unsure of how to move forward after a disillusioned Joe abruptly leaves Cardiff Electric, immolating the truck containing the first shipment of Giants.

=== Season 2 (2015) ===
No. overall	No. in season	Title	Directed by	Written by	Original release date	U.S. viewers (millions)
11	1	"SETI"	Juan José Campanella	Christopher Cantwell & Christopher C. Rogers	May 31, 2015	0.659
More than a year has passed since the launch of the Giant. Joe had reconnected with his old college classmate Sara Wheeler and he is now living with her in Austin. Cardiff Electric is liquidated after Nathan sells the company off to an overseas corporation. Gordon, as the outgoing company president, receives a dividend payment of over $800,000. Joe, however, receives nothing after Nathan shreds Joe's check as retribution for his actions over the past two years; despite returning empty-handed, Joe proposes to Sara, and she accepts. At Mutiny, Donna expresses her frustration over Cameron's lack of leadership and long-term planning, especially as their makeshift network infrastructure experiences latency issues and power outages. Donna notices two users are chatting long after their game ended, inspiring her to develop standalone chat rooms. Donna misses a celebratory dinner with Gordon and the kids when she helps Cameron deal with a fence selling stolen computer components. After dealing with the fence, Donna and Cameron eventually agree that they would share responsibility for the leadership role at Mutiny. The next day, Cameron picks up Bosworth after he is released from prison.
12	2	"New Coke"	Phil Abraham	Jonathan Lisco	June 7, 2015	0.494
Joe and Sara meet with Jacob Wheeler, Sara's father and CEO of Westgroup Energy. Noting Joe's troubled work history, Jacob offers him a job with Westgroup. Joe initially declines, but he later accepts the offer; after arriving at Westgroup's headquarters, Joe discovers that he was given a low-level data entry job. Donna shows Cameron her new dedicated chat feature, Community; however, Cameron is not impressed. Cameron hires the recently-paroled Bosworth to manage Mutiny. At home, Gordon loads Mutiny's Tank Battle and obsesses over a glitch in the game, eventually telling the coders how to correct it. Donna and Cameron attempt to seek capital to expand Mutiny, but they are turned away by a sexist venture capitalist. The coders discover that a user had cloned Mutiny's flagship game Parallax and is distributing copies for free. Donna and Cameron confront the hacker, Tom Rendon, and Cameron hires him after he demonstrated how he got multiple users to log in to Mutiny on a single phone line, much to Donna's chagrin. After the coders find a rather personal letter between him and Cameron, Bosworth tells her that Mutiny isn't the right place for him at the moment and needs time alone.
13	3	"The Way In"	Jeff Freilich	Jason Cahill	June 14, 2015	0.452
Gordon writes a program called Sonaris to map the size of Mutiny's network. Bosworth sees his ex-wife Ginny for the first time since his release from prison, and she tells him not to come to their son James' rehearsal dinner; against Ginny's wishes, Bosworth shows up in an attempt to reconcile with James. At Mutiny, Donna notes that Community is gaining in popularity and attracting new subscribers. After moving back to Dallas, Joe and Sara invite the Clarks over to their apartment for a dinner party, and they reluctantly accept. After Mutiny is infected by unknown malware, Cameron orders the coders to shut down the network, and Tom explains to her the extent of the damage; Tom discovers that Gordon's Sonaris program is the malware. Cameron lashes out at Gordon for his interference, and he retorts that without Donna paying Mutiny's bills, the company would have collapsed sooner. The next morning, Cameron experiences a panic attack after seeing no subscribers logged on, but Tom manages to calm her down. Gordon apologizes to Donna for launching Sonaris without telling her. In Westgroup's data center, Joe sees potential for a new venture.
14	4	"Play with Friends"	Kimberly Peirce	Dahvi Waller	June 21, 2015	0.451
Joe pitches an idea to a Westgroup executive, configuring the company's mainframe for time-sharing during off-hours; however, Joe's proposal is dismissed. At Mutiny, Cameron and Donna tell the coders that due to the Sonaris incident, the company is operating at a deficit and cannot afford to pay their salaries; however, many of them choose to stay on. Bosworth reviews Mutiny's expenses, and he volunteers to go door-to-door to persuade Mutiny's subscribers to rejoin the service. Joe recruits Gordon for his time-sharing project; Gordon agrees to help with the stipulation that Mutiny is Joe's first client. Already mounting tensions between Cameron and Donna intensify when Cameron wants to cut Community from the network. While playing dart tag with the coders, Tom and Cameron get an idea for Mutiny's next game, a multiplayer first-person shooter. Joe reveals to Gordon that he intends to configure Westgroup's mainframe for time-sharing in secret, hoping to show Jacob physical evidence of his idea before legitimatizing it. The next morning at home, Gordon tells Donna that he arranged a new network partner for Mutiny at a substantial discount, and she sits in the bathroom with a positive pregnancy test.
15	5	"Extract and Defend"	Michael Morris	Zack Whedon	June 28, 2015	0.543
When Donna asks Gordon about Mutiny's new network partner, he reveals that Mutiny has been leasing their improved network infrastructure from Joe. During a doctor's visit, Gordon learns that he has toxic encephalopathy due to his exposure to lead solder as well as his usage of cocaine during the development of the Giant. The diagnosis leaves him in shock; however, he does not share his diagnosis with Donna. Due to Donna wanting Mutiny's network rental agreement in writing, Gordon tells Joe that he needs to tell Jacob about his time-sharing project; despite Joe doing the project without approval, Jacob takes an interest and requests a meeting with a representative from Mutiny. Joe wants Donna to go to Westgroup to help pitch his idea; however, she tells him that Mutiny is Cameron's company. Despite her animosity towards Joe, Cameron meets with Jacob and demonstrates how Mutiny works. After the meeting, Sara sees Cameron confront Joe, with Cameron accusing him of using Westgroup to advance his own agenda; however, Joe insists that it's a legitimate business endeavor. After Joe signs a prenuptial agreement from her father, Sara tells Joe that they're moving too fast and need time apart.
16	6	"10Broad36"	Larysa Kondracki	Jamie Pachino	July 5, 2015	0.558
Jacob tells Joe that he revised Mutiny's network rental contract, raising their hourly rate from $3 to $5. Gordon takes his daughters to California to see his brother Henry, and Gordon reveals his condition to Henry; Gordon also reconnects with Henry's ex-girlfriend Jules, which escalates to an affair. When Joe goes to Mutiny to discuss the new terms, Donna lashes out against Joe, which results in him taking Mutiny offline. Donna goes to Westgroup to apologize to Joe for her outburst; he then offers Mutiny a reduced rate if they meet certain benchmarks, including porting their programs to the AT&T UNIX PC. Tom suggests faking the demo to get the reduced rate, then go cross-platform at their leisure; however, Joe manages to see through their deception. After lying to her mother earlier about having a miscarriage, Donna has Cameron drive her to an abortion clinic. Despite the ruse, Joe is impressed by Mutiny's innovation to transmit data over coaxial cable, and he suggests to Jacob that Westgroup should acquire them.
17	7	"Working for the Clampdown"	Karyn Kusama	Christopher Cantwell & Christopher C. Rogers	July 12, 2015	0.499
Gordon finally reveals his condition to Donna; however, he downplays the severity of his disease. When Joe comes by Mutiny with Westgroup's formal acquisition offer, Cameron rallies the coders against "selling out", and she tears up the contract. Gordon recruits Ed and Larry, two of his former Cardiff colleagues, for his new venture, direct selling custom built PCs. Joe speaks with Bosworth and Tom individually in an attempt to get Cameron to reconsider Westgroup's offer. Curious about the contract, the coders piece it back together, and after discovering its value, they pressure Cameron into reconsidering the offer, and Cameron eventually agrees to sell. After toasting their acquisition, Joe learns that Jacob wants to cut game development from Mutiny; seeing this as a betrayal of his intentions, Joe advises Cameron to pull out of the deal, and he tells her that he will no longer interfere. After reconciling with Sara, she tells Joe that she wants to get married right away and move to California, and Joe agrees. The next morning, Cameron tells the coders that she is not selling Mutiny.
18	8	"Limbo"	Daisy von Scherler Mayer	Zack Whedon	July 19, 2015	0.497
Donna chides Cameron for her decision to not sell Mutiny to Westgroup. Joe and Sara reveal to Jacob that they got married, and Joe resigns from Westgroup. As Mutiny makes preparations for a customer appreciation party, Cameron and Tom finish up their latest game, Extract and Defend. Ed and Larry walk out on Gordon's venture when they question his mental health. As Joe and Sara pack, she finds a bag of ecstasy and suggests that they go to a nightclub to celebrate their last night in Dallas. Gordon finds an advertisement for another Dallas-based PC builder, and he suspects that Stan, another former colleague of his, had conspired against him; Gordon breaks into Stan's garage at night, and Gordon is arrested after Stan confronts him. Joe and Sara sneak into Westgroup's data center to have sex, and Joe discovers that Jacob's new time-sharing team had created "WestNet" by cloning Mutiny's user interface. After Mutiny's party winds down, Donna and Cameron brainstorm about Community's future; however, they discover that the coders have been locked out of the network. When Joe goes to Mutiny to explain that he's not responsible for WestNet, they don't believe him.
19	9	"Kali"	Craig Zisk	Jason Cahill	July 26, 2015	0.588
Donna and Cameron discuss their legal options against Westgroup, and Cameron decides to sell Extract and Defend to sustain Mutiny. Tom is upset that Cameron made this decision without consulting him, and the two breakup as a result. After Joe bails Gordon out of jail, Gordon investigates the computer company that he believed copied his idea; however, Gordon has a lapse in memory and forgets where he parked. During Westgroup's shareholders meeting, Joe gives a keynote speech about WestNet and gives Cameron her due credit; however, unbeknownst to Joe, Cameron had sabotaged the presentation by uploading Sonaris to Westgroup's mainframe, which ends up heavily disrupting all of their business. After Gordon falls down a flight of stairs and injures his ankle while trying to find his car, the doctor tells Donna that Gordon is suffering from psychological stress beyond his brain damage, and Gordon finally admits to her that he needs help. Sara accuses Joe of still holding feelings towards Cameron and sabotaging WestNet. Bosworth informs Cameron that he's leaving Mutiny for a more stable job with his son.
20	10	"Heaven Is a Place"	Phil Abraham	Christopher Cantwell & Christopher C. Rogers	August 2, 2015	0.485
In the fallout of the WestNet fiasco, Jacob is ousted as CEO of Westgroup, and Sara files for divorce from Joe. Desiring independence, Cameron finds a listing for a used IBM 3033 mainframe in California that Mutiny could use to host their network. Donna finds out about Gordon's affair, which causes their elder daughter Joanie to run away. Feeling responsible for Joe's misfortunes, Gordon gives Joe a counter-program he wrote to remove Sonaris from infected systems and inoculate them from future infections. At his son's company, Bosworth shows remorse for leaving Mutiny and ultimately returns. After finding Joanie, Donna tells Gordon that to save their marriage, she wants him to move the family to California, work for Mutiny, and purchase and repair the mainframe Cameron wanted. Using Gordon's program, Joe secures $10 million in venture capital, and tries to recruit Gordon for the new business, but Gordon tells him that he's working for Mutiny. One month later, the Mutiny team board a flight bound for San Francisco; at the same time, Joe looks at prime office space in the Bay Area for his new company, MacMillan Utility.

=== Season 3 (2016) ===
No. overall	No. in season	Title	Directed by	Written by	Original release date	U.S. viewers (millions)
21	1	"Valley of the Heart's Delight"	Daisy von Scherler Mayer	Christopher Cantwell & Christopher C. Rogers	August 21, 2016	0.367
Six months after Mutiny moved to California, Gordon and Donna finally get their mainframe operational, and Cameron announces that the company has surpassed 100,000 subscribers. After reading a scathing article about Mutiny, Donna realizes that the company needs something new in order to stay relevant in Silicon Valley. Ryan Ray, a new coder at Mutiny, reveals vulnerabilities within Mutiny's private chat; he proposes a solution, but Donna and Cameron aren’t receptive to his ideas, especially after he violated Mutiny's terms of service by hacking the private chats to find faults in the code. During a long work night, Gordon vents his anger over how Joe had used him and his antivirus idea to make a fortune. Reviewing the private chat transcripts, Donna and Cameron realize that users are using private chats to facilitate user-to-user transactions, and they believe that this could be the next big thing for Mutiny. At the Castro Theatre, Joe reveals at a press conference that MacMillan Utility is offering its newest antivirus program, Citadel, free of charge for consumers, with the audience reacting with applause. Ryan is present at the press conference, and he is inspired by Joe's speech.
22	2	"One Way or Another"	Kimberly Peirce	Michael Saltzman	August 23, 2016	0.339
Donna and Cameron attempt to secure venture capital to expand Mutiny for its new online trading platform, Mutiny Exchange. Gordon decides to take Ryan under his wing, seeing a kinship with him; however, Ryan tries to seek out Joe. After a disastrous meeting with a sexist venture capitalist, Donna and Cameron meet with Diane Gould, who Donna had previously met as their daughters attend the same school. As Mutiny makes its presentation, Diane reveals that another company, Swap Meet, had the same idea as Mutiny as well as an 18-month head start; rather than compete against Swap Meet, Mutiny proposes to buy them out. Ryan manages to get a meeting with Joe, and Ryan makes his pitch on why he wants to work for Joe and MacMillan Utility. As Gordon is being deposed in connection with a lawsuit against Joe, Joe interrupts the deposition to offer Gordon a 70 percent stake in MacMillan Utility in exchange for dropping the suit and partnering once again, but Gordon staunchly rejects his offer. Joe calls Ryan at Mutiny, inviting him to work at MacMillan Utility; as Ryan walks out, Gordon is left in shock over Ryan's decision.
23	3	"Flipping the Switch"	Jeff Freilich	Lisa Albert	August 30, 2016	0.397
Cameron unsuccessfully tries to persuade Ryan against working with Joe. Marital tensions between Donna and Gordon flare up during a project meeting, leading to a heated argument on Mutiny's office floor. Diane accompanies Bosworth to Swap Meet to tender their buyout offer. Mutiny had initially planned to acquire Swap Meet for $600,000; after seeing their bare-bones operation, Bosworth realizes that Mutiny had overvalued Swap Meet, and he haggles down the offer to nearly half. At MacMillan Utility, Joe has Ryan accompany him to a senior board meeting, and the board decides to start charging $14.95 for Citadel. Ryan sees this as a betrayal of Joe's principles, and he insists to Joe that Citadel should be distributed for free as announced. In need of a new revenue stream, Joe pulls Ryan from his office job to begin work on a special project from Joe's apartment. After Cameron gives a guest lecture at a local college, Joe confronts her, thanking her for destroying his career, which allowed him his newfound success. At Mutiny, Gordon and Donna apologize for their earlier outburst; however, they start arguing again when Cameron decides that she'll take over Ryan's duties.
24	4	"Rules of Honorable Play"	Jake Paltrow	Alison Tatlock	September 6, 2016	0.312
At Mutiny, Cameron shows stubbornness towards Doug and Craig, the former owners of Swap Meet, in adapting Mutiny's code to make it compatible with Swap Meet's; Diane insists to Donna that Cameron and Doug need to fix their untenable relationship lest the partnership collapses. At Joe's apartment, he and Ryan brainstorm ideas for MacMillan Utility's next venture. In hopes of easing tensions between the Mutiny and Swap Meet coders, Gordon takes them to an arcade to play laser tag. Cameron eventually decides to implement Swap Meet's changes; however, she tells Donna that she wants to fire Doug and Craig. Although Diane states that she would reluctantly accept Cameron's decision, Donna lies to Cameron, saying that Diane won't let her fire Doug and Craig. MacMillan Utility loses a major contract with General Atomics after Joe is insulted by a homophobic senior executive while renegotiating their contract. Despite this, Joe gives Ryan access credentials to ARPANET, and Joe tells Ryan to map the network before their security clearance is revoked.
25	5	"Yerba Buena"	Andrew McCarthy	Mark Lafferty	September 13, 2016	0.324
At Mutiny, the coders discover that users want a way to make cash transactions on Swap Meet; Doug and Craig had been working on a solution to accept credit card payments, and Donna implores Cameron to implement it, but she is reluctant to do so. At Joe's apartment, while studying the ARPANET map, Joe sees potential in NSFNET; however, Ryan sees it as a waste of time, since commercial usage of the network is not permitted. During the Independence Day weekend, Bosworth and Cameron return to Dallas, with Bosworth seeing his newborn grandson, and Cameron intending to retrieve her father's motorcycle, as her mother and stepfather are moving to Florida; she also reconciles with her ex-boyfriend Tom. When her father's motorcycle is sold to someone else, Bosworth and Cameron have a falling out, and he returns to San Francisco without her. Donna gives Doug and Craig approval to implement their credit card interface; however, when Cameron returns, she and Donna argue over that decision. Joe stands by his decision to focus on NSFNET, telling Ryan that they're going to create a regional network from it. When Cameron calls Diane, Cameron finds out about Donna's deception.
26	6	"And She Was"	Michael Morris	Angelina Burnett	September 20, 2016	0.280
At MacMillan Utility, Joe and Ryan begin setting up their regional network. At Mutiny, Cameron reveals that she just fired Doug and Craig; Diane then tells Cameron and Donna that Mutiny should consider going public after receiving an acquisition offer from CompuServe. Sensing tension between them, Diane tells Cameron and Donna to think about it over the weekend, inviting them to her vacation house in Sonoma to unwind. Joe pitches his NSFNET proposal to the MacMillan Utility board; despite disapproval from the board, the NSFNET sector chief accepts Joe's bid in a handshake deal. While Donna takes up Diane's offer, Cameron stays at home, where she bonds with Gordon; Gordon reveals his medical condition to Cameron and airs his grievances against Joe. Cameron goes to Joe’s apartment to convince him to give Gordon his due credit for creating MacMillan Utility. Cameron moves out of the Clark household, and she reveals to Gordon that she and Tom had gotten married. A senior executive at MacMillan Utility informs Joe that the board had voted to terminate the NSFNET project and revoke Joe's executive authority. During a deposition meeting, Joe, against his lawyer's advice, admits that he stole Gordon’s idea.
27	7	"The Threshold"	Karyn Kusama	Michael Saltzman	September 27, 2016	0.307
In light of his confession, Joe is ousted as CEO of MacMillan Utility, which is renamed Citadel Utility. Joe tells Ryan that the NSFNET project is on hold, and that he will end up getting fired as well. Gordon's lawyer informs him of Joe's confession; Gordon later learns about Joe’s NSFNET project after confronting him in his apartment. Donna and Cameron eventually agree to pursue an IPO; the next day, Cameron shows Donna a business plan she drew up to improve Mutiny before the IPO. Donna shows concern over Cameron’s plan, since her plan could take up to two years to fully implement while the IPO's window is three months, discussing it with both Diane and Gordon separately. Cameron calls an impromptu meeting regarding the IPO; Diane, Gordon, and Bosworth reluctantly side with Donna, leaving Cameron in shock. Feeling that he can no longer trust Joe, Ryan leaks the source code for Citadel to the public, claiming that he made it truly free. Joe tells Ryan what he did was illegal; however, Ryan shows overconfidence in covering his tracks.
28	8	"You Are Not Safe"	Reed Morano	Lisa Albert & Alison Tatlock	October 4, 2016	0.366
Ryan is being investigated by the FBI for violating the Computer Fraud and Abuse Act. Donna, Diane, and Bosworth figure out how to go forward on Mutiny’s IPO without Cameron. Because of Ryan's actions, the future of the NSFNET regional network is put into jeopardy. Joe turns to Cameron for help in tracking Ryan since he went off the grid, and Joe is concerned for his safety; she eventually finds Ryan at a college library. At Cameron’s house, Tom tells her that his company wants him to move to Tokyo for a promotion, and Cameron is happy to go with him. Ryan later goes to Joe’s apartment; Joe gives Ryan two options: he can either remain a fugitive and lose the network, or turn himself in for a chance at redemption. In any case, they would never work together anymore. When Mutiny’s IPO goes live, their stock trades far below expectations. In the morning, with the FBI at Joe's door, he discovers Ryan had committed suicide. After that, Joe tells Gordon to complete the work on the regional network without him, as Joe feels he can no longer profit from it.
29	9	"NIM"	Christopher Cantwell	Mark Lafferty	October 11, 2016	0.407
Four years have passed since Mutiny’s failed IPO and Ryan's suicide. Mutiny has folded, Donna and Gordon have divorced, Gordon has completed the work on the NSFNET regional network, and Donna is now a senior partner at Diane’s venture capital firm. Donna contacts Joe, who is now an independent consultant, stating that she has a proposition for Cameron; however, he refuses to be her middleman. Cameron, now working for Atari, goes to Las Vegas for COMDEX to promote her latest game Space Bike IV; Joe shows up at her booth, and the two reconnect. Joe and Cameron attend a suite party hosted by Atari, and Cameron finds Donna there. Donna tries to pitch her project and wants to make amends, but Cameron, who is still resentful towards Donna and Mutiny's downfall, refuses to hear her out. Joe goes to check on Cameron, and the two have sex in her suite. Before Cameron leaves Las Vegas, she reconsiders Donna's proposal, and when Joe returns to San Francisco, he reads the memo faxed to him by Donna about the project, the World Wide Web.
30	10	"NeXT"	Phil Abraham	Christopher Cantwell & Christopher C. Rogers	October 11, 2016	0.287
Donna sets up a meeting in the former Mutiny offices. She, Gordon, Joe, Cameron, and Tom discuss the potential of the World Wide Web, but each have conflicting ideas and concerns; during the discussion, Joe reveals that he met Tim Berners-Lee at a conference in Paris, receiving the hypertext toolkit for the World Wide Web. The group leaves at a stalemate. Cameron visits Bosworth, having doubts about the project, and he tells her that the project must be worth pursuing if it got everyone together. The next day, Joe writes out the source code for CERN’s web browser, proposing that they can build something bigger. Everyone except Tom is receptive to Joe’s idea; Tom and Joe get into a heated argument, which escalates into a physical altercation between them. Gordon warns Joe that their past personal grievances may destroy the project before it can even begin. When Donna offers Cameron an opportunity to oust Joe, Cameron tells Donna that she can no longer work with her. Donna replies, begrudgingly, that Cameron can take ownership of the project and leaves. Joe, Gordon, and Cameron then take the first steps into the project.

=== Season 4 (2017) ===
No. overall	No. in season	Title	Directed by	Written by	Original release date	U.S. viewers (millions)
31	1	"So It Goes"	Juan José Campanella	Christopher Cantwell & Christopher C. Rogers	August 19, 2017	0.340
In the three years since their meeting about the World Wide Web, Joe and Gordon have formed CalNect, a new internet service provider, in the former Mutiny offices. Joe expresses his frustration over Cameron’s inability to get their web browser, Loadstar, completed after Gordon shows him Mosaic, a new browser gaining in popularity. While doing a focus group of her new game Pilgrim, Cameron expresses frustration as the testers show disinterest towards the game. For his 40th birthday, Gordon has a lavish backyard party featuring a performance by Blue Man Group. At the party, Diane tells Bosworth that CalNect would face stiff competition from America Online if they expand west. After Cameron gives Joe the final version of Loadstar, he gets a new idea, a way to index every website on the Internet. At her venture capital firm, AGGE, Donna meets with a startup company called Rover, and she gives them funding after they propose to use their algorithm originally designed for cataloging medical databases to index websites and make them searchable. Cameron tells Joe that Tom had left her and that she’s not returning to Japan.
32	2	"Signal to Noise"	Meera Menon	Mark Lafferty	August 19, 2017	0.340
Joe and Cameron reconcile over the events, both professional and personal, of the past three years. Donna sets up an incubator for Rover and appoints her assistant Tanya Reese to oversee it. Gordon finds out that his younger daughter Haley is skipping school; as he brings her to his office, CalNect is facing a crisis over bandwidth due to their new flat monthly rate as a response to AOL's threat of expansion. Gordon then tasks Haley with indexing Joe’s research, which she uses to create a web directory, "Haley's Comet". At AGGE, Donna complains to Diane about a new senior partner, Trip Kisker, being brought on to the firm. Atari informs Cameron that they have decided to shelve Pilgrim indefinitely. As customer service calls increase at CalNect, Gordon tells his employees to contact their backbone provider MCI to increase their bandwidth capacity; however, he realizes that MCI is starting their own ISP when they refuse Gordon's request. Bosworth reveals to Gordon that a bad real estate investment had wiped out his savings. At the now-renamed AGGEK, at the insistence of the other partners for an outside consultant, Donna brings on Bosworth to manage Rover, much to Tanya's disappointment.
33	3	"Miscellaneous"	Jeff Freilich	Zack Whedon	August 26, 2017	0.270
Faced with mounting pressure from both AOL and MCI, Gordon decides to sell CalNect. Joe sees Haley’s work, and he wants to buy Haley’s Comet to develop it further; however, Haley refuses to sell, insisting that she wants to work on it herself. Joe and Gordon argue over letting Haley develop the website, which Joe renames as simply "Comet", with Gordon noting Joe’s history of pushing people beyond their limits. Gordon allows Haley to continue working on Comet with the stipulation that she walk away the moment she is no longer having fun with the project. Atari discovers that Pilgrim was leaked to Electronic Gaming Monthly, who gave the game a scathing review, and Cameron claims responsibility for the leak. At the newly-renamed AGGEK, Donna is displeased with Rover’s progress. Diane reprimands Donna for her hostility towards Trip as well as for being too harsh towards the Rover team; Donna invites the Rover team to her house for a dinner party in hopes of easing tensions. Trip later informs the other partners about Comet competing against Rover; while having dinner with Gordon, Donna learns that he and Haley are competing against her.
34	4	"Tonya and Nancy"	Stacie Passon	Alison Tatlock	September 9, 2017	0.344
At Comet, Joe and Gordon review Rover, and both agree that the website is substandard. Cameron tells Joe that Comet needs a more sophisticated algorithm to index websites as the World Wide Web continues to grow to possibly millions of websites. At AGGEK, Tanya and Bosworth argue with Donna over launching Rover too early in response to Comet. To assist in indexing, Joe and Gordon hire Dr. Katie Herman as chief ontologist for Comet. The Rover team requests series A funding to better compete with Comet, but Donna is hesitant. After rejecting a low-ball buyout offer from AOL, Joe and Gordon meet with a venture capital firm to expand Comet; however, they ultimately decide against pursuing VC funding. Cameron buys a plot of land and a used Airstream trailer; after Cameron has trouble with the trailer’s plumbing, Bosworth comes by to help her fix it. Bosworth reveals to Cameron his personal debt and problems at Rover, and Cameron helps him out with Rover’s algorithm. Donna eventually grants Rover series A financing; however, she becomes suspicious of the origin of their new indexing algorithm.
35	5	"Nowhere Man"	So Yong Kim	Angelina Burnett	September 16, 2017	0.313
Donna questions Cecil, Rover's lead programmer, over the new search algorithm. Gordon and Katie start a relationship. At Comet, Joe worries about Rover’s newfound funding. Donna freezes additional hires for engineers at Rover until Cecil can provide specifications for the algorithm for copyright purposes. Tom comes by Cameron’s trailer unexpectedly to give her their divorce papers, and the two reach closure with their failed marriage. Bosworth tries to get the algorithm's source code from Cameron, but she refuses to help him further, as it would put her in conflict with Joe. While having dinner with Donna, she questions Bosworth over the algorithm, and he suffers a heart attack. When Cameron comes to the hospital to check on Bosworth, Donna realizes that she wrote the algorithm, and she tells Cameron to stay out of her life. Cameron later admits to Joe that she indeed helped Bosworth. Gordon reveals to Donna that Bosworth is $300,000 in debt, which is why he turned to Cameron for help.
36	6	"A Connection is Made"	Michael Morris	Julia Cho	September 23, 2017	0.354
Donna fires Cecil from Rover so she can have an outside programmer reverse engineer Cameron’s algorithm. As Gordon, Joe, Cameron, and Katie celebrate Haley’s birthday, Cameron tells Gordon that she wants to get out of tech. Haley later sends Cameron a link to a fansite dedicated to her work, and it renews her confidence. Cameron later meets with Alexa Vonn, who offers Cameron financial assistance for a new project. After Gordon finds out that Haley is failing two classes, he insists that she take time off from working on Comet to focus on her schoolwork; however, she refuses. Joe believes that Haley isn’t like other teenagers and insists that she needs Comet, but Gordon does not agree with him. Bosworth finally admits to Diane his bad real estate investment and that Cameron helped him with Rover's search algorithm. Diane then orders Donna to buy Cameron’s source code outright and turn control of Rover over to Trip. Cameron agrees to sign over the algorithm to Rover, but she turns down compensation. Cameron senses that Donna is in disarray, but Donna leaves before she can figure out why.
37	7	"Who Needs a Guy"	Tricia Brock	Lisa Albert	September 30, 2017	0.322
Cameron begins working on a new game for Alexa, which precludes any quality time with Joe. Bosworth and Diane get married at Palo Alto City Hall. In a conversation with Gordon, Donna tells him that Rover is outperforming Comet in terms of web traffic; however, she believes that user retention is the key to their respective websites' long-term success. Gordon decides to use Donna’s comments as a basis to improve Comet by transforming it into a web portal. Diane reveals to Donna her plans to retire as a managing partner at AGGEK. Gordon admits to Joe that he was right about Haley, and Gordon allows her to return to work at Comet. Despite agreeing to help Gordon redesign Comet, Joe confronts Donna, accusing her of trying to sabotage Comet; however, the two eventually come to an understanding about each other's professional struggles. As Gordon prepares for a date with Katie, he has hallucinations from the past. When Donna calls Gordon, Katie answers the phone and tells Donna that Gordon has died. Later, Joe and Cameron face uncertainty over Comet’s future.
38	8	"Goodwill"	Christopher Cantwell	Zack Whedon	October 7, 2017	0.327
Donna, Joanie and Haley go to Gordon’s house to pack up his belongings, and Joe and Cameron show up later to help. While cleaning out Joanie’s room, Donna discovers a stack of unsent college applications and demands an explanation, but Joanie refuses to talk about it. Cameron offers to talk to Joanie and has limited success. Haley asks Donna about Gordon’s green sweater, and Joe tells her he dropped off all of Gordon’s clothing at Goodwill; they try to retrieve it but are unsuccessful. Katie stops by and reveals that she is resigning from Comet and leaving San Francisco for Seattle. Donna and Cameron try to reconcile over the events of the last decade that drove them apart. Joanie admits to Haley why she doesn’t want to go to college, and Haley tells Joanie that she may be a lesbian. Bosworth comes by to cook chili for the group, and they reminisce about Gordon as they eat.
39	9	"Search"	Daisy von Scherler Mayer	Mark Lafferty	October 14, 2017	0.394
At Comet, Joe prepares for the site's relaunch, planning to integrate Comet into Netscape and hoping to become its default search engine. Diane stops by Donna's house, telling Donna she must make the decision of whether or not she wants the managing partner position. Haley lashes out at Joe for profiting from Comet. Donna is reluctant to become the new managing partner at AGGEK; however, both Cameron and Haley convince her to take the job. After receiving a clean bill of health, Bosworth tells Diane that he wants to travel the world together. While Joe and Cameron review the beta version of Netscape Alexa had sent Cameron, they see a link for Yahoo, an upstart web portal, and Joe realizes that Netscape had struck a deal with Yahoo to become their default search provider. The next morning, they break up. When Donna is announced as the new managing partner at AGGEK, Trip informs her that Comet is all but dead.
40	10	"Ten of Swords"	Karyn Kusama	Christopher Cantwell & Christopher C. Rogers	October 14, 2017	0.394
Realizing Comet cannot compete with Yahoo, Joe shuts down the company. Donna revamps AGGEK and renames the VC firm Symphonic Ventures. After an unsuccessful overseas business trip, Cameron ends her professional relationship with Alexa. She begins to pack up her Airstream, telling Bosworth she's leaving California. She stops at Joe's apartment to drop off his belongings and finds that he has moved out. Later, she goes to Donna's house, where Donna mentions that Joe had written to Haley. When Haley's hard drive crashes, Cameron and Donna try to fix it. Cameron proposes that she and Donna work together again, which surprises Donna. During a gala promoting women in tech, Donna refers to Cameron as "my last and best partner". On the morning Cameron is ready to set out on a cross-country road trip, Donna meets her at a diner for breakfast. As she pays the check, Donna seems to have an epiphany. Joe has returned to New York and became a humanities teacher at a prep school.
