= Mad Men season 3 =

Season of television series

Mad Men
- Season 3
- Season 3 promotional poster
- Starring: Jon Hamm; Elisabeth Moss; Vincent Kartheiser; January Jones; Christina Hendricks; Bryan Batt; Michael Gladis; Aaron Staton; Rich Sommer; Robert Morse; John Slattery
- No. of episodes: 13

Release
- Original network: AMC
- Original release: August 16 – November 8, 2009

Season chronology
- ← Previous; Season 2 Next → Season 4

The third season of the American television drama series Mad Men premiered on August 16, 2009, and concluded on November 8, 2009. It consisted of thirteen episodes, each running approximately 48 minutes in length. AMC broadcast the third season on Sundays at 10:00 pm in the United States.

Season three begins in roughly April/May 1963 (six months after the conclusion of the second season) and ends on December 16, 1963. It covers the end of Kennedy's "Camelot era" in the country, and chronicles the characters going through immense change in their professional and personal lives.

The third season was exalted by television critics and was a major winner in many television awards. Mad Men won the Primetime Emmy Award for Outstanding Drama Series, Golden Globe Award for Best Drama Series, and acknowledgement by the American Film Institute for the third year in a row. According to year end lists collected by Metacritic, Mad Men was the most acclaimed show of 2009.

== Cast ==
=== Main cast ===
- Jon Hamm as Don Draper
- Elisabeth Moss as Peggy Olson
- Vincent Kartheiser as Pete Campbell
- January Jones as Betty Draper
- Christina Hendricks as Joan Harris
- Bryan Batt as Salvatore Romano
- Michael Gladis as Paul Kinsey
- Aaron Staton as Ken Cosgrove
- Rich Sommer as Harry Crane
- Robert Morse as Bert Cooper
- John Slattery as Roger Sterling

=== Recurring cast ===
- Jared S. Gilmore as Bobby Draper
- Kiernan Shipka as Sally Draper
- Alexa Alemanni as Allison
- Jared Harris as Lane Pryce
- Patrick Cavanaugh as "Smitty" Smith
- Christopher Stanley as Henry Francis
- Alison Brie as Trudy Campbell
- Deborah Lacey as Carla
- Chelcie Ross as Conrad "Connie" Hilton
- Abigail Spencer as Suzanne Farrell
- Ryan Cartwright as John Hooker
- Edin Gali as Kurt Smith
- Julie McNiven as Hildy
- Ryan Cutrona as Gene Hofstadt
- Anne Dudek as Francine Hanson
- Crista Flanagan as Lois Sadler
- Eric Ladin as William Hofstadt
- Peyton List as Jane Sterling
- Mark Moses as Herman "Duck" Phillips
- Samuel Page as Greg Harris
- Laura Regan as Jennifer Crane
- Charles Shaughnessy as St. John Powell
- Talia Balsam as Mona Sterling
- Embeth Davidtz as Rebecca Pryce
- Elizabeth Rice as Margaret Sterling
- Audrey Wasilewski as Anita Olson Respola

=== Guest stars ===
- Sarah Drew as Kitty Romano
- Darren Pettie as Lee Garner, Jr.
- Myra Turley as Katherine Olson
- Jamie Thomas King as Guy MacKendrick

== Plot ==
Six months after the Cuban Missile Crisis, major changes have been made to the staff, including the addition of new financial officer Lane Pryce, a PPL executive brought in from the London office. Pete is offered the role of Head of Accounts by Lane, but is upset to learn that he will be sharing the title and responsibility with executive Ken Cosgrove.

At a country club party that Roger and Jane throw, Don and Betty both connect with strangers; Don strikes up a conversation with Conrad "Connie" Hilton, founder of Hilton Hotels, while Betty has a friendly conversation with Henry Francis, who works for Governor Rockefeller. Connie harasses Don with late night phone calls and seeks off the books help with regard to advertising, overwhelming Don, who struggles to create quality material. When Connie learns Don has no contract tying him to the agency, Bert uses his knowledge of Don's assumed identity to pressure him into signing a contract so as to retain Hilton's interest.

Joan announces her resignation at Sterling Cooper to become a housewife, but is troubled when Greg is passed over for an important promotion due to his subpar surgical skills. Greg later informs Joan that he is enlisting to become an Army surgeon. Meanwhile, executives from PPL travel from London to tour the Sterling Cooper offices and to present a new organization plan that places the agency under a new up-and-comer, Guy MacKendrick, and transferring Lane to Bombay. During a party celebrating Joan's departure, Ken brings a John Deere lawnmower that accidentally runs over MacKendrick's foot. MacKendrick is presumed unable to perform his duties and Lane is informed that he will keep his job in the States in the interim.

Betty's father Gene, suffering from his strokes, comes to live with the Drapers and strikes up a warm relationship with his granddaughter Sally. Gene soon dies, and Sally scolds her parents and relatives for their apparent lack of grief at his demise. Betty gives birth to a boy, naming him Gene over Don's strenuous objections. Betty later enlists Henry's help with a neighborhood petition and becomes smitten with him, sending him letters and meeting with him in secret, while Don begins having an affair with Sally's teacher Suzanne Farrell. During this period, Duck Phillips tempts both Pete and Peggy with business overtures to entice them to come to work with him at Grey; while neither accepts the business proposition, Peggy does accept Duck's initiation of a sexual relationship with her.

Near the end of the season, Betty breaks into the drawer to the desk in Don's den. She finds his box of Dick Whitman's family photos as well as evidence of Anna Draper's existence and Don's divorce from her. She directly confronts Don, who is forced to divulge the secret of his former identity and his desertion in Korea. The news of the assassination of John F. Kennedy shocks the employees of Sterling Cooper, although Don remains composed; Don's inability to connect to Betty's emotional grief over the death of the President leads Betty to tell Don that she doesn't love him anymore and that she wants a divorce.

Connie meets with Don to inform him that Sterling Cooper and PPL are both being bought out by McCann Ericson, the firm handling Hilton's other accounts. Infuriated, Don begins hatching plans with Bert and Roger to buy the company. When their offer is rebuffed, Don realizes that Lane's authority to fire the other conspirators would sever their contracts, giving them the ability to walk away and start a new advertising agency. Lane agrees with the scheme and becomes a partner, and Don and Roger start reaching out to other employees to join their new agency, including Pete and Peggy.

While drinking with Roger, Don learns about Betty's relationship with Henry Francis and confronts her physically. However, Don later calls Betty to tell her that he will not fight the divorce, and Betty leaves with the baby and Henry to get a divorce in Reno. Don, Peggy, Roger, Bert, Lane and Pete subsequently break into the Sterling Cooper office to take necessary supplies and files, with Joan and Harry called in to join the company and help them. The group meets in a small hotel room, where Joan answers calls with the name of the new firm: Sterling Cooper Draper Pryce.

== Episodes ==
No. overall	No. in season	Title	Directed by	Written by	Original release date	US viewers (millions)
27	1	"Out of Town"	Phil Abraham	Matthew Weiner	August 16, 2009	2.76
A flashback depicts Don's stepmother Abigail experiencing a stillbirth; she is later given an infant named Dick, whose prostitute mother has died in childbirth. In early 1963, following Sterling Cooper's sale to a British company, major changes are made to the staff, including the firing of account executive Burt Peterson, and the addition of new financial officer Lane Pryce. Joan gives Burt's former office to John Hooker, Lane's assistant. Lane appoints Pete to head of accounts, but pits him against Ken by offering him the same position; Pete expresses dismay to Trudy about having to share the position. Sal accompanies Don on a business trip to Baltimore, and the two men embrace the anonymity of their surroundings by masquerading as "Bill" and "Sam" respectively. They both engage in extramarital liaisons while on the business trip—Don with a stewardess, and Sal with a bellboy. When the hotel fire alarm goes off, Don rushes down the fire escape and catches Sal with the bellboy. On the flight home from Baltimore, Don subtly hints to Sal that he won't tell anyone, pitching a concept for London Fog with the tagline, "Limit your exposure".
28	2	"Love Among the Ruins"	Lesli Linka Glatter	Cathryn Humphris and Matthew Weiner	August 23, 2009	1.90
The creative team at Sterling Cooper argues over the "Bye Bye Birdie" ad campaign for Pepsi's new diet cola, Patio; Peggy questions whether it is the best way to target female consumers, but Don dismisses her. Pete brings representatives of Madison Square Garden into Sterling Cooper for their campaign to demolish Penn Station and build a new stadium. Paul alienates the representatives by siding with the protestors, forcing Don to meet with representative Edgar Raffit; Don suggests that Raffit stop fretting over public opinion, and instead change the conversation to which Madison Square Garden is the cornerstone of New York's renaissance. Raffit accepts the approach, but Lane later advises Don to drop Madison Square Garden due to the projected billings. Don gets his first glimpse of Sally's teacher, Suzanne Farrell. Peggy has an uneasy one-night stand with an engineering student. Following concerns over the treatment of Betty's ill father, Don has Gene move in with their family. Betty's brother William is unnerved and proposes putting Gene in a nursing home, but Betty accuses him of maneuvering to take over their parents' sumptuous home.
29	3	"My Old Kentucky Home"	Jennifer Getzinger	Dahvi Waller and Matthew Weiner	August 30, 2009	1.61
A mandatory overtime session for the Bacardi account leaves Paul and Smitty trying to stave off late-night boredom and spark creativity with cannabis. Peggy demands to be included and stands up to her colleagues for only ever asking for her opinions on women's products. Shocking the men, Peggy gets stoned and ends up finding inspiration for the account. Sally has a run-in with Gene when she steals five dollars from him; Betty assumes her father is merely being forgetful about the money. Joan and Greg host a dinner party for Greg's boss and colleagues. Joan is troubled to learn that Greg might not be as talented of a surgeon as she was led to believe, and that his promotion to Chief Resident is at risk. Don reluctantly attends a Kentucky Derby party that Roger and Jane are hosting. Don ends up striking a friendship with a folksy guest named Connie from another event, while Betty meets political advisor Henry Francis. Roger confronts Don for his animosity; Don counters that no one is jealous of Roger's supposed happiness, and that everyone thinks he's a fool.
30	4	"The Arrangements"	Michael Uppendahl	Andrew Colville and Matthew Weiner	September 6, 2009	1.51
Gene continues to live at the Draper residence, reviewing his will and funeral arrangements with Betty. He also grows closer to his grandchildren, teaching Sally how to drive and telling Bobby about his World War I stories. Pete's wealthy college friend Horace Jr. arrives at Sterling Cooper to propose elaborate promotions about the sport of jai alai. Upon learning that Bert is friends with Horace's father, Don feels uneasy about taking the money and meets with Horace Sr. to discuss his son's scheme; Horace Sr. advises against declining the account, opining that his son will just turn to another advertising agency if rejected. Stricken by the conversation, Don later looks at old pictures of Archie and Abigail. Peggy searches for a new roommate and announces her intentions to move to Manhattan, much to her mother's dismay. Sal lands an opportunity to direct the Patio Cola commercial, while Kitty starts sensing something is off about their relationship. A policeman arrives at the Draper residence, informing them that Gene has died while waiting in line at the A&P. Sally is devastated and lambasts her family for being unmoved by Gene's death.
31	5	"The Fog"	Phil Abraham	Kater Gordon	September 13, 2009	1.75
In the wake of the death of Gene, Sally begins to misbehave in class, much to Betty and Don's dismay. Betty and Don meet with Suzanne to discuss the matter; Suzanne later calls the Draper house late at night, appearing smitten with Don. Pete learns that Admiral, a television company whose sales have plateaued, are selling well among African-American customers. He devises a plan for Admiral to buy up cheaper ad space in African-American publications, but the company representatives are deeply opposed to the idea. Duck invites Peggy and Pete to lunch in an effort to recruit them; he reveals his knowledge of their affair and believes that Pete helped Peggy's career, but they both deny it. Peggy later meets with Don to discuss getting a raise, but he brushes her off, citing Lane's strict cost-cutting measures. Don takes Betty to the hospital when she goes into labor; Betty is given heavy pain medication and hallucinates encounters with both of her parents, as well as the recent assassination of civil rights leader Medgar Evers, which is all over the news. Betty ends up giving birth to a baby boy, whom she names Eugene in honor of her father.
32	6	"Guy Walks Into an Advertising Agency"	Lesli Linka Glatter	Robin Veith and Matthew Weiner	September 20, 2009	1.57
The agency's British owners visit Sterling Cooper to reassign Lane to one of their India-based companies over the Independence Day weekend; Guy MacKendrick, Lane's replacement, is then introduced to the company. After tendering her resignation, Joan finds out that Greg's application for a medical residency in New York was rejected, and he drunkenly tells Joan she can't leave her job. When Joan reveals that it is not possible, Greg advises her to get another job. Don meets with Connie, who is revealed to be famous hotelier Conrad Hilton; Connie is impressed and tells Don he wants to do business with him. Sally is having trouble adjusting to the presence of Baby Gene, telling Don that she believes Baby Gene is the ghost of her grandfather. Don implores Betty to change their son's name, but Betty refuses, coldly stating that Sally will get over it. During a party to celebrate Joan's departure, Ken brings a riding lawnmower into the office; Lois tries to drive the lawnmower and accidentally runs over Guy's foot, mangling him. At the hospital, the agency's British owners announce that Guy has lost his foot, and that Lane will stay in New York for the time being.
33	7	"Seven Twenty Three"	Daisy von Scherler Mayer	Andre Jacquemetton & Maria Jacquemetton and Matthew Weiner	September 27, 2009	1.73
Don assists Miss Farrell in helping the students make a camera obscura to view the solar eclipse of July 20, 1963. Betty hosts a campaign to prevent the installation of a huge water tank that will drain the scenic local reservoir, and she meets with Henry Francis to discuss the project. Peggy receives an expensive scarf from Duck, and decides to visit him in-person to return it. She tells Duck she is not interested in changing agencies, but their meeting unexpectedly brings them together romantically. Don's attempt to land the Hilton Hotel account backfires when Connie's lawyers refuse to work with him unless Sterling Cooper signs him to a contract; Don is reluctant. Angry and drunk, Don picks up a young couple hitchhiking their way to Niagara Falls; he follows them to a roadside motel and swallows two of their phenobarbital pills, briefly experiencing a vision of his father before being knocked out by the man. The next day, Don discovers that the couple have robbed him of everything but his car. Returning to the office, Bert blackmails Don over his theft of the "Don Draper" identity and forces him to sign the three-year contract with Hilton.
34	8	"Souvenir"	Phil Abraham	Lisa Albert and Matthew Weiner	October 4, 2009	1.91
It's August 1963. After they win the reservoir case, Henry kisses Betty. Sally attacks Bobby after he spies on her kissing Francine's son Ernie. After being informed of the incident by her maid Carla, Betty confronts Sally for fighting with Bobby, advising her to control her temper, and lectures her about kissing boys. While Trudy is away, Pete runs into Gudrun, the German au pair of his neighbors, the Lawrences. Gudrun is distressed after staining a dress she had borrowed from Mrs. Lawrence, leading Pete to help her find a replacement at a local department store. In the process, Pete discovers that Joan works as a manager at the department store. Later, Pete coerces Gudrun into sleeping with him, provoking a confrontation with Mr. Lawrence, who instructs Pete to leave Gudrun alone. Don invites Betty to a business trip to Rome to inspect the hotel in Hilton. They manage to renew romantic interest in each other, but the return home brings things back to normal.
35	9	"Wee Small Hours"	Scott Hornbacher	Dahvi Waller and Matthew Weiner	October 11, 2009	1.53
After a phone call from Connie, a restless Don drives in to work early and is surprised to see Suzanne jogging along the side of the road so far before sunrise. Betty finds herself drawn to Henry, who proposes that Betty use her house as the venue for an upcoming fundraiser. When Henry sends a different representative in his place at the fundraiser, Betty angrily confronts Henry at his house; the two kiss, but she changes her mind when he locks the door. Meanwhile, Connie disapproves of the new advertising campaign for Hilton Hotels, bewildering Don. Don later visits Suzanne, and they begin an affair. Lee Garner Jr., an executive for Lucky Strike, makes sexual advances towards Sal. When Sal refuses, Lee Garner Jr. calls Harry and demands that Sal be fired; Harry relays the phone call to Roger and Don. As Lucky Strike is Sterling Cooper's largest client, Don shows little sympathy for Sal and fires him, telling him he will land on his feet somewhere else. Sal later calls Kitty from a pay phone, telling her he has to work late, but instead goes out with a group of gay men.
36	10	"The Color Blue"	Michael Uppendahl	Kater Gordon and Matthew Weiner	October 18, 2009	1.61
Suzanne and Don's affair is complicated by the arrival of Suzanne's troubled brother, Danny, who has lost his job because he has epileptic seizures. Suzanne arranges a new job for her brother in Massachusetts; Don drives Danny to Massachusetts, but relents when the young man asks to be dropped off well before its location. Paul suffers from writer's block and grows resentful of Peggy's success. Paul and Peggy work overtime to come up with a pitch for Western Union; Paul has a drunken brainstorm while chatting with a custodian, but panics the next morning upon realizing that he has neglected to write it down. Betty discovers Don's desk drawer key and decides to inspect it; she discovers multiple artifacts revealing Don's past life, including old Whitman family photographs, the deed to Anna's house, and the divorce decree dissolving her marriage to Don. The firm prepares to celebrate its 40th anniversary, and Roger and Bert express reluctance at attending the firm's anniversary party, in which Don will be the party's final speaker. Lane is informed by the agency's British owners that Sterling Cooper is being sold.
37	11	"The Gypsy and the Hobo"	Jennifer Getzinger	Marti Noxon & Cathryn Humphris and Matthew Weiner	October 25, 2009	1.72
Betty seeks advice from her family attorney regarding Don's secret past; he advises her to salvage her marriage, due to the financial repercussions of a divorce. Meanwhile, Roger meets with Annabelle, a former client/lover who wishes to rekindle their affair. However, Roger sends her away, telling her he is happy with Jane. Joan discovers that Greg, after a failed attempt to switch to psychiatry, has joined the Army to ensure that he will become a surgeon. Joan pretends to be happy for Greg, but seems apprehensive over the prospect. Don proposes going on a trip with Suzanne, but his plans are derailed when Betty confronts him about his identity theft. Don is forced to divulge the truth about himself, detailing his childhood–including his prostitute mother and his stepparents–as well as taking the identity of the real Don Draper during the Korean War. Don emotionally recounts Adam's suicide, admitting that he turned his brother away to salvage his reputation. After finishing telling his entire unhappy history, Don admits he was surprised Betty ever loved him at all.
38	12	"The Grown-Ups"	Barbet Schroeder	Brett Johnson and Matthew Weiner	November 1, 2009	1.78
Lane informs Pete that Ken will be made Head of Accounts, leaving Pete to ponder his future at Sterling Cooper. Roger's daughter, Margaret, complains to Mona about Jane giving her marital advice and demands that Jane not attend the wedding, leading Roger to reprimand Jane for upsetting Margaret. News of John F. Kennedy's assassination reaches Sterling Cooper, and the employees gather around the television in Harry's office to watch the news. Margaret is devastated that her upcoming wedding will be ruined by the news, while Pete, already despondent over Ken being promoted over him, resolves to stay at home and watch the news on TV with Trudy. Betty is heartbroken by the news and, while everyone else shows sorrow, grief, and fear for the future, Don remains composed. Don convinces Betty to go to Margaret's wedding, which is sparsely attended; Don assures Betty that everything will be fine, but she seems unconvinced. Following the subsequent live-on-television shooting of Oswald by Jack Ruby, Betty is distraught and leaves the house to meet Henry, who proposes that they get married. Betty returns home and informs Don that she no longer loves him.
39	13	"Shut the Door. Have a Seat."	Matthew Weiner	Matthew Weiner & Erin Levy	November 8, 2009	2.32
Don is informed by Connie that McCann Erickson is buying Puttnam, Powell, and Lowe, and thereby also Sterling Cooper. Before the sale of Sterling Cooper is to take effect, Don convinces Bert that they should buy the company themselves instead of being passed around by bigger entities. In need of capital, Don repairs his friendship with Roger. With Lane's assistance, Don, Bert, and Roger form a new agency, Sterling Cooper Draper Pryce, with them as equal partners; Peggy, Joan, Pete and Harry are recruited to move with them. Peggy is initially reluctant until Don finally recognizes her talents, telling her if she doesn't come along, he will spend the rest of his life trying to hire her. Betty tells Don that she is preparing to file for divorce; Don is angered to discover her relationship with Henry, and Betty threatens to reveal his secret identity if he does not consent to the divorce. Later, Don informs Betty he wants to avoid animosity, and voluntarily moves out, promising Sally and Bobby he'll never stop being their father no matter where he lives. That evening, Betty takes a plane to Reno with Henry and the baby to prepare for the divorce.

== Production ==
=== Crew ===
Series creator Matthew Weiner also served as showrunner and executive producer, and is credited as a writer on 12 of the 13 episodes of the season, often co-writing the episodes with another writer. Lisa Albert remained supervising producer and wrote one episode. Writing team Andre Jacquemetton and Maria Jacquemetton became consulting producers and co-wrote one episode together. Robin Veith was promoted to executive story editor and wrote one episode. Kater Gordon was promoted to staff writer and wrote two episodes. Marti Noxon remained consulting producer and wrote one episode. New writers in the third season included Dahvi Waller, who wrote two episodes; writer's assistant Erin Levy, who wrote one episode; executive story editor Cathryn Humphris, who wrote two episodes; script coordinator Brett Johnson, who wrote one episode; and freelance writer Andrew Colville, who wrote one episode. Other producers included Blake McCormick, Dwayne Shattuck, and Scott Hornbacher, who was promoted to executive producer.

For the third season, seven of the nine writers for the show were women, in contrast to Writers Guild of America 2006 statistics that show male writers outnumber female writers by 2 to 1. As Maria Jacquemetton notes:

We have a predominately female writing staff—women from their early 20s to their 50s—and plenty of female department heads and directors. [Show creator] Matt Weiner and [executive producer] Scott Hornbacher hire people they believe in, based on their talent and their experience. 'Can you capture this world? Can you bring great storytelling?'

Phil Abraham directed the most episodes of the season with three, while Lesli Linka Glatter, Jennifer Getzinger, and Michael Uppendahl each directed two. The remaining episodes were directed by Daisy von Scherler Mayer, Scott Hornbacher, Barbet Schroeder, and Matthew Weiner, who directs each season finale.

== Reception ==
=== Critical reception ===
The third season of Mad Men has received critical acclaim. Review aggregator Rotten Tomatoes reports that 97% of 29 critics have given the season a positive review with an average score of 9.4/10. The site's consensus is: "Mad Men brilliantly weaves its characters into its historical setting, and the result is thoughtful, shocking, and terrifically entertaining." On Metacritic, the third season scored 87 out of 100 based on 20 reviews, indicating universal acclaim.

Time critic James Poniewozik cited the show's excellence in writing and acting, and said "Mad Men's willingness to let moments play out seems as much a period flourish as its fedoras and highballs." Of the third season, Poniewozik felt that the third season was "a notch behind season 1 and ahead of season 2. It didn’t have the phenomenal run of one staggering episode and scene after another like the first did, but this season built confidently to a climax and did an outstanding job of both capturing the sweep of history and how it related to the characters’ lives." Tim Goodman of the San Francisco Chronicle warned viewers from falling for any inevitable backlash after the myriad of award wins for the series, saying that "the humor, the note-perfect clothing and sets, the creeping cultural change - are still there to be savored. But what the series traffics in with astute complexity is the troubling notion of self, of identity, of rootless, undefined purpose and unrealized happiness". Goodman also noted that the series was not made for a mass audience.

Robert Bianco of USA Today said the third season was compelling because "we all know the late-stage Camelot universe the characters occupy is about to shatter" and that the series was filled with "madness and passion". Alessandra Stanley of The New York Times described Mad Men as "essentially one long flashback, an artfully imagined historic re-enactment of an era when America was a soaring superpower feeling its first shivers of mortality." Robert Lloyd of the Los Angeles Times said the series was "a moral drama, a show about deciding who you are and who you want to be, of character as the sum of small choices. There are no heroes or villains here, only people working out or being carried toward their individual destinies. And in who we root for and in what we root for them to choose, we also define ourselves."

In one of the few negative reviews, Hank Stuever of The Washington Post said that Mad Men "has importance sickness, and its idea of levity is to inject moments of utter callousness." Stuever lamented that once "a TV show was just a TV show. It was on when it was on; if you missed it, you missed it. You certainly wouldn't build your life around talking about it or telling other grownups they had to watch old episodes of it in order to catch up. You were supposed to give it two seconds' thought."

Alan Sepinwall of The Star-Ledger said that by the end of the season "we've crossed a generational line in the series. Kennedy is dead. The Beatles fly into New York in a few months. The '50s are definitively over, and what we think of as the actual '60s is just beginning."

=== Accolades ===
The third season continued Mad Men's streak of award wins and nominations at the 62nd Primetime Emmy Awards. The series won both Outstanding Drama Series and Outstanding Writing for a Drama Series (Matthew Weiner and Erin Levy for "Shut the Door. Have a Seat"), both for the third year in a row.

In the acting categories, Jon Hamm and January Jones were nominated for Outstanding Lead Actor in a Drama Series and Outstanding Lead Actress in a Drama Series, respectively. John Slattery and Robert Morse were nominated for Outstanding Supporting Actor in a Drama Series and Outstanding Guest Actor in a Drama Series, respectively. Christina Hendricks and Elisabeth Moss were both nominees in the Outstanding Supporting Actress in a Drama Series category. Robin Veith and Matthew Weiner also received an additional nomination in the Outstanding Writing for a Drama Series category for writing "Guy Walks into an Advertising Agency". Lesli Linka Glatter was also nominated in Outstanding Directing for a Drama Series for her work on "Guy Walks into an Advertising Agency".

The American Film Institute honored the "transformative" third season of Mad Men as one of the ten greatest television achievements of 2009, exalting both January Jones and Jon Hamm for leading the strong ensemble. Mad Men won Best Television Drama Series at the 67th Golden Globe Awards for the third year in a row. Jon Hamm was nominated for Best Actor – Television Series Drama for the third year in a row. January Jones was nominated for Best Actress – Television Series Drama for the second year in a row.

At the 2009 Writers Guild of America Awards, the series was honored with the Dramatic Series award. The series also received Episodic Drama nominations for "The Grown Ups" (Brett Johnson and Matthew Weiner) and "Guy Walks into an Advertising Agency" (Matthew Weiner and Robin Veith). At the 2009 Directors Guild Awards, Mad Men director Lesli Linka Glatter won for her work on "Guy Walks into an Advertising Agency". Matthew Weiner ("Shut the Door. Have a Seat") and Jennifer Getzinger ("The Gypsy and the Hobo") were also nominated for their directorial work in the same "Dramatic Series" category.

The cast of Mad Men won Outstanding Performance by an Ensemble in a Drama Series at the 16th Screen Actors Guild Awards for the second year in a row. Jon Hamm was also nominated for Outstanding Performance by a Male Actor in a Drama Series for the third year in a row. The series was nominated for the Outstanding Achievement in Drama award at the 26th TCA Awards.
