= Guy Walks Into an Advertising Agency =

- Mad Men episode
- The shirts of Sterling Cooper employees are splattered with blood after the lawn mower accident. This scene has been cited by critics as one of the most memorable scenes from Mad Men.
- Episode no.: Season 3 Episode 6
- Directed by: Lesli Linka Glatter
- Written by: Robin Veith; Matthew Weiner
- Original air date: September 20, 2009
- Running time: 48 minutes

Guest appearances
- Jared Harris as Lane Pryce; Kiernan Shipka as Sally Draper; Crista Flanagan as Lois Sadler; Samuel Page as Greg Harris; Chelcie Ross as Connie Hilton; Charles Shaughnessy as Saint John Powell; Ryan Cartwright as John Hooker; Jamie Thomas King as Guy MacKendrick; Patrick Cavanaugh as Smitty Smith; Judy Kain as Olive Healy; Carol Locatell as Miss Wakeman

Episode chronology
← Previous "The Fog"	Next → "Seven Twenty Three"
- Mad Men season 3

"Guy Walks Into an Advertising Agency" is the sixth episode of the third season of the American television drama series Mad Men, and the 32nd overall episode of the series. It was written by series creator and executive producer Matthew Weiner and Robin Veith, and directed by Lesli Linka Glatter. It originally aired on the AMC channel in the United States on September 20, 2009.

The employees of Sterling Cooper prepare for an upcoming visit from the British owners of the company. Joan discovers some deeply unsettling news as she prepares for her last day in the office. During the visit, a lawnmower accident changes the life and career of one man forever. Meanwhile, Sally is having trouble adjusting to life with Baby Gene and without her grandfather.

"Guy Walks Into an Advertising Agency" is considered by some as one of the best episodes of Mad Men. It was recognized with nominations and wins from industry awards. The director of the episode, Lesli Linka Glatter, won a 2009 Directors Guild Awards for her work on the episode. The episode was also nominated for writing and directing at the 62nd Primetime Emmy Awards.

The name of this episode mirrors the name of an episode of The Sopranos, "Guy Walks into a Psychiatrist's Office...", a series on which Mad Men creator, Matthew Weiner, was a writer.

== Plot ==
Mr. Hooker announces, flanked by the partners, to the Sterling Cooper employees that the office will soon receive a visit from their British owners, Putnam, Powell & Lowe. The staff are dismayed, as they were supposed to be closed for the July 4th holiday, and the visit will overlap with Joan's last day. After the announcement, Ken Cosgrove enters riding a John Deere lawnmower and reveals he's won their business.

Bert speculates that the British are interested in promoting Don and bringing him back to London, noting PPL's fascination with Don. Bert also insists Don and Roger get a shave together to diffuse the lingering tension between them over Roger's marriage to Jane and his selling the company. At the barber's shop, the two agree to put their disagreements behind them.

Joan prepares a celebratory dinner for Greg, anticipating his promotion to Chief Resident, but he comes home late and drunk. He reveals he didn't get the promotion and tells Joan she can't leave her job. When she tells him it's not possible, he tells her to get another one.

The PPL partners, St. John Powell (Charles Shaughnessy) and Harold Ford (Neil Dickson) arrive with charming, handsome account man Guy MacKendrick (Jamie Thomas King). They tour the office and meet with the Sterling Cooper partners. Guy reveals he is the source of PPL's fascination with Don, dashing the idea that Don could be brought to London. Powell and Ford then meet privately with Lane and compliment him on his success at Sterling Cooper, then abruptly tell him they're now sending him to Bombay to do similar work. Lane is visibly frustrated, having only just settled in New York.

Guy holds a meeting with the Sterling Cooper employees to announce that he will replace Lane as Chief Operating Manager, positioned above Bert and Don. Bert points out that Roger has been left off the chart entirely. The executives leave the Sterling Cooper employees feeling extremely disgruntled, except for Harry, who doesn't realize he's the only one who got a promotion.

At the Draper house, Sally is having trouble adjusting to the presence of Baby Gene, refusing to go near him or enter his room. Betty believes she is jealous of the attention the baby is getting. She tries to rectify the situation by giving Sally a Barbie doll and claiming it is a gift from Baby Gene. However, Sally remains distressed by his presence and throws the doll away.

At Sterling Cooper, a party is held to celebrate the Putnam, Powell, and Lowe visit as well as Joan's last day. When Guy makes a speech thanking Joan for her ten years of work and wishing her all the best in her "new life," she becomes emotional.

Don receives a request for a meeting with Conrad Hilton, a hotel owner, and leaves the party to speak with him. He realizes that Conrad Hilton is Connie, a man he met previously. Connie has Don evaluate some Hilton ads, and Don impresses him, then tells him he wants an opportunity to win his business.

At Sterling Cooper, Peggy sincerely congratulates Joan on her seeming happiness, while Smitty begins driving the John Deere lawnmower around the office. Lois then climbs aboard and tries to drive the lawnmower, but accidentally runs over Guy's foot, spraying blood on her co-workers and mangling Guy. Joan quickly springs into action, applying a tourniquet and getting Guy medical help.

Don arrives at the hospital and hears the news from Joan. They share a laugh over the grim events and he assures her she will be missed. Lane, Powell and Ford arrive and announce that Guy has lost his foot, then mourn over his career, lamenting that he cannot work without a foot, as he can no longer play golf. They announce Lane will remain in New York for the time being, and after they leave, Lane expresses discontent with his position.

Don returns home and finds Sally's doll in the bushes. He returns it to her room, causing her to wake up screaming at its reappearance. Betty is annoyed and dismisses Sally's emotional display. Sally tells Don that she is frightened because she believes Baby Gene is the ghost of Grandpa Gene. Don implores Betty to change the name, because of both Sally's discomfort and his poor relationship with her father, but Betty refuses and says coldly that Sally will get over it. Don then comforts Sally, and tells her that her baby brother is a brand new person, and that's a wonderful thing.

== Reception ==
=== Critical reception ===
The episode received critical acclaim from television journalists and critics. Alan Sepinwall, writing for New Jersey's The Star-Ledger, called it "one of the best Mad Men episodes ever" and the "highlight of Season 3 to date". Sepinwall also opined that it was one of the series' funniest episodes yet, while also working as a "dramatic marvel" and having considerable shock value through the lawn mower accident. Maureen Ryan of the Chicago Tribune exalted the hour as "jaw-dropping awesomeness" and expected Emmy wins for the writers and director, while praising both Christina Hendricks and Jon Hamm's performances. She directed special praise for Lesli Linka Glatter, saying that "the way she staged the 'fete' at SC, the injury of Guy, and especially that scene in Kinsey's office was just right. The lawnmower was threaded through the episode perfectly, and once we saw it emerge at the party, we thought typical SC party high jinks were, er, afoot. But suddenly, there's that arc of blood and that spatter across several partygoers. It was truly one of Mad Men's Most. Shocking. Moments."

Time magazine writer James Poniewozik said the episode was a "sufficiently stunningly bloody episode to make up for several episodes of smoke exhalations and brooding looks." Poniewozik, however, criticized the "dropped-like-a-brick mention of Vietnam in the office conversation. It's plausible that people were starting to talk about Vietnam in 1963, but there are better ways than by kicking off a dialogue, 'My dad keeps talking about Vietnam'." Tim Goodman of the San Francisco Chronicle wasn't sure if it was a "pivotal episode of Mad Men", but that "if this episode isn't bound to be a classic, who cares – Mad Men certainly is."

=== Ratings ===
On its original American broadcast on September 20, 2009, on AMC, the episode was viewed by 1.57 million people.

=== Accolades ===
At the 62nd Directors Guild of America Awards, episode director Lesli Linka Glatter won the Directors Guild of America Award for Outstanding Directing – Drama Series. The episode was also nominated for the Writers Guild of America Award for Television: Episodic Drama at the 62nd Writers Guild of America Awards.

For the 62nd Primetime Emmy Awards, the episode received two nominations – Outstanding Writing for a Drama Series (Robin Veith and Matthew Weiner) and Outstanding Directing for a Drama Series (Lesli Linka Glatter).
