= Cathryn Humphris =

American television writer

- Occupation: Television writer
- Writing career
- Notable work: Mad Men

Cathryn Humphris is an American television writer. She has worked on the AMC drama Mad Men and has won a Writers Guild of America (WGA) Award.

== Biography ==
Humphris worked as a production assistant and a writer's assistant on Once and Again in 1999. She began writing for television for the series Supernatural in 2006. She co-wrote the first-season episode "Dead Man's Blood" with co-executive producer John Shiban. She returned as a writer for the second season and wrote the episodes "The Usual Suspects" and "Born Under a Bad Sign". She continued to write for the third season and wrote the episode "Bedtime Stories" and wrote the teleplay and co-wrote the story (with Sera Gamble) for the episode "Dream a Little Dream of Me". She became a story editor for the fourth season in 2008 and wrote the episodes "Metamorphosis" and "Sex and Violence".

Humphris joined the crew of AMC drama Mad Men as an executive story editor and writer for the third season in 2009. She co-wrote the episode "Love Among the Ruins" with series creator and show runner Matthew Weiner and co-wrote the episode "The Gypsy and the Hobo" with consulting producer Marti Noxon. Humphris and the writing staff won the Writers Guild of America (WGA) Award for Best Drama Series at the February 2010 ceremony for their work on the third season. Other series she would work on after included Under the Dome, NCIS: New Orleans and The Hot Zone.
