= Chris Rogers =

Chris Rogers may refer to:

- Chris Rogers (American football) (born 1977), American football player
- Chris Rogers (cricketer) (born 1977), Australian cricketer
- Chris Rogers (jockey) (1924–1976), thoroughbred horse racing jockey
- Chris Rogers (journalist) (born 1975), British newscaster
- Chris Rogers (mathematician) (born 1954), mathematician
- Chris Rogers (politician) (born 1987), American politician
- Chris Rogers (rugby union) (born 1956), South African rugby union player
- Christopher C. Rogers, American television producer

== See also ==
- Chris Rodgers (born 1976), English golfer
- Christopher Rodgers (disambiguation)
