= The Fog (Mad Men) =

- Mad Men episode
- Episode no.: Season 3 Episode 5
- Directed by: Phil Abraham
- Written by: Kater Gordon
- Original air date: September 13, 2009
- Running time: 48 minutes

Guest appearances
- Jared Harris as Lane Pryce; Ryan Cutrona as Eugene "Gene" Hofstadt; Kiernan Shipka as Sally Draper; Mark Moses as Herman "Duck" Phillips; Abigail Spencer as Suzanne Farrell; Matt Bushell as Dennis Hobart; Anne Dudek as Francine Hanson; Jayne Taini as Elaine; Michael Canavan as Bob Adamson; Yeardley Smith as Mary; La Monde Byrd as Hollis; Peter Breitmayer as Raymond Garvey

Episode chronology
← Previous "The Arrangements"	Next → "Guy Walks Into an Advertising Agency"
- Mad Men season 3

"The Fog" is the fifth episode of the third season of the American television drama series Mad Men. The episode was written by Kater Gordon and directed by Phil Abraham. It was originally broadcast on September 13, 2009, on AMC. The employees of Sterling Cooper continue to contend with Lane's efforts to reduce spending. Pete Campbell encounters resistance when pitching a new marketing proposal to a client. Betty and Don welcome their third child into the world.

== Plot ==
Don and Betty meet with Sally's teacher, Suzanne Farrell, to discuss Sally's recent acting out. When Betty admits that her father has just died, and Sally was very close with him, she is overcome with emotion and leaves.

At Sterling Cooper, Pete continues to work harder than ever to compete with Ken's success as co-head of accounts. Pete discovers that Admiral, a television company whose sales have plateaued, are selling exceptionally well among African-American customers. He devises a plan for Admiral to buy up cheaper ad space in African-American publications to target them as a demographic, but the representatives from Admiral are deeply opposed to the idea. Roger, Bert and Lane scold Pete for angering the Admiral executives, but resignedly admit that Pete had the right idea, but the wrong client.

Miss Farrell calls the Draper house late at night, supposedly to apologize for upsetting Betty, but she appears smitten with Don. Betty goes into labor and Don takes her to the hospital, where she is given heavy pain medication and hallucinates encounters with both of her parents as well as the recently assassinated civil rights leader Medgar Evers. In the waiting room, Don bonds over a liquor bottle with another expectant father, Dennis Hobart, who is deeply concerned for his wife and is afraid of her dying in childbirth and being unable to love his baby.

When Betty wakes, she finds she has given birth to a son, who she names Gene in honor of her father, though Don is clearly uncomfortable with this. He later passes Dennis in the hall, who pretends not to know him.

Duck invites Peggy and Pete to lunch as part of his efforts to recruit them, and reveals he knows they had an affair and believes that Pete helped Peggy's career as a result. They deny it and Pete, offended, storms out. Peggy is more hesitant, but leaves as well.

Don returns to the office and Peggy meets with him about getting a raise, noting that she does the same work as Paul Kinsey and usually it's of higher quality. Don brushes Peggy off, reminding her about Lane's strict cost-cutting measures, and Peggy asks, "What if this is my time?"

At the Draper house, Betty is woken by her crying baby and reluctantly gets out of bed to care for him.

== Production ==
“The Fog” was written by Kater Gordon and directed by Phil Abraham. It aired September 13, 2009. All of the office scenes at Sterling Cooper were filmed at the Los Angeles Center Studios (LACS.) The house used for the exterior of the Draper residence can be found at 675 Arden Road Pasadena, California. Like the offices of Sterling Cooper, the scenes involving the interior of the household were filmed at LACS. Like many episodes of Mad Men, "The Fog" employs the single-camera mode of production. This gives the audience the sense of being a direct witness to the action and lends itself well to the style of the narrative. Additionally, many scenes are filmed from below eye level, giving the audience a view of the ceiling and surrounding environment. In “The Fog” this can clearly be seen during the birth of Gene.

== First appearances ==
- Eugene "Gene" Draper: Don and Betty's third child and second son, Henry's stepson later on and Sally and Bobby's younger sibling. He is named after his grandpa with the same name who died in the previous episode as a tribute to him.

== Critical reception ==
Keith Phipps of The A.V. Club gave “The Fog” an A−. He talked about the overall title of this episode and how it fit perfectly with all the scenes stating, “I wouldn't have chosen “The Fog” from all the possible titles, and yet it fits perfectly.” He also stated, “...all the characters seem in a haze this week, stuck between where they are and where they want to be.” Alan Sepinwall, another critic, went into detail about the scenes of this episode says “...it almost feels like the first four episodes were just an extended prologue, and the story of season three genuinely begins here.”
