= Christopher Rodgers =

Christopher Rodgers may refer to:

- Christopher Raymond Perry Rodgers (1819–1892), officer in the United States Navy
- Chris Rodgers (born 1976), English golfer

== See also ==
- Chris Rogers (disambiguation)
