= My Old Kentucky Home (Mad Men) =

- Mad Men episode
- Episode no.: Season 3 Episode 3
- Directed by: Jennifer Getzinger
- Written by: Dahvi Waller; Matthew Weiner
- Original air date: August 30, 2009

Guest appearances
- Kiernan Shipka as Sally Draper; Alison Brie as Trudy Campbell; Ryan Cutrona as Eugene "Gene" Hofstadt; Peyton List as Jane Sterling; Samuel Page as Greg Harris; Chelcie Ross as Connie Hilton; Christopher Stanley as Henry Francis; Patrick Cavanaugh as Smitty Smith; Laura Regan as Jennifer Crane; Miles Fisher as Jeffrey Graves; Jud Taylor as Honey Stolich; Judy Kain as Olive Healy; Pamela Roylance as Irene Ettinger; Tim Snay as Ronald Ettinger

Episode chronology
← Previous "Love Among the Ruins"	Next → "The Arrangements"
- Mad Men season 3

"My Old Kentucky Home" is the third episode of the third season of the American television drama series Mad Men. It was written by Dahvi Waller and Matthew Weiner and directed by Jennifer Getzinger. The episode originally aired on the AMC channel in the United States on August 30, 2009.

== Plot ==
Pete Campbell and Ken Cosgrove inform Peggy Olson, Paul Kinsey, and Smitty that they must work through the weekend to generate new ideas for the Bacardi rum account. Facing writer's block, Kinsey procures marijuana for himself and Smitty; to their surprise, Peggy smokes as well. While the men waste time, Peggy finds inspiration while high, and realizes what a good place she is in, personally and professionally.

Joan and her husband Greg (Samuel Page) throw a dinner party for Greg's boss, the chief of surgery, and two of his fellow doctors and their wives. Greg argues with Joan about the table setting before their guests arrive. Over drinks, Greg's boss and colleagues reveal that Greg lost a patient recently, calling into question his ability and future promotion prospects. To change the subject, Greg has Joan play the accordion and sing for their guests. Joan easily charms them, but is clearly troubled by what she has learned.

Roger Sterling and Jane Sterling (Peyton List) throw a Derby Party at a Country Club. In blackface Roger sings "My Old Kentucky Home" to Jane for their guests, amusing everyone but Don and Pete, who watch the spectacle uncomfortably. Don leaves and wanders into an unattended bar where he meets a man named Connie, who is also looking for a drink while avoiding a wedding reception. As Don makes drinks for the two of them, they trade stories about their modest beginnings.

As Betty is waiting for Trudy Campbell at the restroom, a man approaches her and asks her about her pregnancy, requesting to touch her stomach. Later, the man is introduced to Don and Betty as Henry Francis (Christopher Stanley), an aide to Governor Rockefeller. Jane and Roger's guests begin dancing, and Pete and Trudy show off their elaborate Charleston abilities. A drunken Jane gushes over Betty, then tells her that she knew she and Don would get back together. Betty storms off, and Jane begins pleading with Don, asking why he doesn't like her. Roger arrives, suspicious, then confronts Don, who tells Roger no one is jealous of his supposed happiness and that everyone thinks he's a fool. The episode ends with Don searching for Betty, finding her and the two embracing each other in reconciliation.

== First appearances ==
- Conrad "Connie" Hilton: A hotel owner and client of Sterling-Cooper who is close to Don and a new father figure for him.
- Henry Francis: A Republican political adviser to Nelson Rockefeller.

== Reception ==
The episode had a viewership of 1.608 million, which revealed growth in viewership compared to the previous season's third episode. The episode was the most watched program of the week. The demographic was between the ages of 18 and 49.

“My Old Kentucky Home” was critically acclaimed by many. Keith Phipps of The A.V. Club gave the episode an “A−”. He mentioned he was at a loss of words and in shock for several of the scenes. He especially pointed to the scene where Roger performs in blackface, as well as when Betty's stomach is touched by Henry Francis, which left Phipps thinking that Henry would appear in future episodes.

TV critic Alan Sepinwall responded with, “‘My Old Kentucky Home' is one of those Mad Men episodes where very little seems to happen in terms of story, but where the atmosphere and character work are both so rich that plot becomes irrelevant.” Sepinwall continued by saying he too was shocked with a few scenes, and also had hopes for Carla to be more involved in the season, since Carla has a unique perspective of the family.

In 2015, as part of New York City’s ongoing tribute to Mad Men at Alice Tully Hall at Lincoln Center, the show's creator Matthew Weiner explained the discomfort surrounding the writing, and then shooting, of the scene involving Roger in blackface. Weiner stated, “There was a lot of controversy in the writers’ room. A lot of the writers were like, ‘you can’t do this.’ I was like, ‘Well, I think that season takes place in 1963 and blackface was not removed from the Philadelphia Police Parade until 1968 or something.’ That episode is about white people and what they’re like when they’re alone. We have a very diverse crew, and everyone understood what was happening, that it was a period piece, and it was not pleasurable for anyone. It was so well established that this was a part of the framework of that time, and it was so clear that we were criticizing it, but we had to live through doing it to criticize it.” In 2020, faced with calls to edit out the scene, a content warning was added to the episode on streaming platforms. As of 2024, the episode has been removed from some streaming platforms.

== Production ==
Series creator and executive producer Matthew Weiner wrote “My Old Kentucky Home” with Dahvi Waller. In an interview Weiner did with AMC, he revealed his vision and thoughts about important moments from the episode. He mentioned how the episode was shown in three parties; the different ages, classes, as well as who belongs where.

In Joan and Greg's party, they are seen for the first time since the incident that occurred in season two, showing that not only has she not left him, but is going to host a party for Greg. While the guests are over, it is mentioned that Greg has lost a patient, which Joan is unaware of. Instead of speaking about it further, Greg has Joan perform to win his guests over. Weiner wanted to emphasize the fact that Greg having Joan perform could be seen as a loving act, but it could also be interpreted as controlling. Weiner stated, “And the fact that he is keeping this appearance up to help himself, to cover for his own inadequacies, is very painful.” When the show's writers asked Christina Hendricks whether she could play the piano she told them of her accordion skill, which they incorporated into the story.

Weiner also wanted to highlight the fact that Don and Roger have different views on life. Don is not very understanding about Roger's choices, and seems to feel out of place at Roger's party.

Regarding Don and Betty's relationship, Weiner wanted to highlight their marital status, and how even by the very end of the episode, after Betty has gotten hit on and Don noticing how in love Roger and Jane are, Betty and Don kiss. Although they kiss, they seem to be both kissing other people. Weiner wanted to reveal how Betty and Don want something else in this episode.
