= Christopher Columbus Rogers =

Murdered American sheriff

Christopher Columbus Rogers (c. 1846–1888) was a controversial and colorful Texan marshal and gunfighter. Rogers, often called "Chris" or just "C.C.", was born in Anderson County, Texas to William Rogers, then the sheriff of the county. At the age of 15, the United States Civil War having broken out, Rogers joined the Confederate States Army, and was tasked with guarding prisoners of war. When the war ended, Rogers began working as a printer at the Trinity Advocate newspaper in Palestine, Texas.

By this time, Rogers had developed a reputation of being violently opposed to Reconstruction, and in quick succession he assaulted John H. Morrison, an agent of the Freedmen's Bureau, and murdered Dan Cary, Palestine's marshal. After killing Cary, Rogers fled to nearby Tyler, Texas, where he opened up a saloon. While in Tyler, Rogers killed a rival saloonkeeper named Mose Remington during a gunfight; Rogers was later acquitted as acting in self-defense.

During the spring of 1873, the town of Palestine decided to elect a new marshal to help deal with the spike of violence associated with its relatively new position as a railroad town. Rogers ran unopposed and was elected to the position, which he held until his death. During his tenure as marshal, Rogers is believed to have killed nine men, bringing his total to around 12.

In 1887, Rogers attempted to arrest his friend Tom O'Donnell for a misdemeanor offense, but the two ended up in a gun battle that left O'Donnell dead. Rogers, whose violence and history had already left some in the town unsure about his suitability as a lawman, was suspended while the city investigated the shootout. While on suspension, Rogers was stabbed to death by a man named Bill Young as he sat unarmed in a local saloon enjoying a beer while talking to Young. Rogers had called Young a liar, starting the argument. Young had been upset about a recent argument with Rogers over what had happened to O'Donnell.

Reference-Descendant of the Rogers family.
