= Dahvi Waller =

Canadian screenwriter and television producer

- Born: Montreal, Quebec, Canada
- Education: Princeton University
- Occupations: Screenwriter; Television producer
- Years active: 2005–present

Dahvi Waller is a Canadian screenwriter and television producer. The recipient of a Primetime Emmy Award and three Writers Guild of America Awards, she is best known for her work on the television series Mad Men and the television miniseries Mrs. America.

== Life and career ==
Born in Montreal, Quebec, the daughter of Harold Myron Waller, a professor of political science at McGill University, and Diane Goodman, she received a Bachelor of Arts degree in history from Princeton University.

From 2003 to 2004, Waller began working as one of the directors for the reality TV show Switched Up!, which aired on ABC.

In 2005, Waller joined the writing staff of the drama series Commander in Chief which aired for one 18 episode season from 2005 to 2006. She is credited for writing one episode with Anya Epstein.

From 2006 to 2008, she joined the crew of Desperate Housewives as a staff writer, and for the third season of the show she joined Josh Senter and Jenna Bans on the show's team of story editors. She has writing credits on six episodes of the show.

She then served as a writer and co-producer on the ABC comedy–drama Eli Stone from 2008-2009 with two writing credits alongside Wendy Mericle.

Waller joined the AMC drama series Mad Men in 2009 as a co-producer for the show's third season and was a producer for the series' fourth season. In addition to her role as a producer, she also wrote 2 episodes of the Emmy winning drama alongside show runner and creator Matthew Weiner and one episode alongside Weiner and writer Kater Gordon.

Waller and the show's writing staff won the Writers Guild of America (WGA) Award for Best Drama Series for their work on Mad Men in 2010 and 2011.

She shared the Primetime Emmy Award for Outstanding Drama Series in 2011 with Mad Men's production team.

Waller was also among those nominated at the Producers Guild of America Awards in 2011 for her work on Mad Men.

Waller has worked as a supervising producer and co-executive producer on the AMC Original Series Halt and Catch Fire in 2014 and 2015. In 2020, she created the FX-on-Hulu miniseries Mrs. America, which had its series premiere on April 15.

She has written for the stage, with her one act play Between Movements debuting in 2012 as part of an initiative called Unscreened in conjunction with the Elephant Stages-Lillian Theatre in Los Angeles, California.

== Works ==
=== Writing credits ===
Commander in Chief
Title	Year	Credit	Notes
"First...Do No Harm"	2005	Writer, with Anya Epstein	

Desperate Housewives
Title	Year	Credit	Notes
"Thank You So Much"	2006	Writer	
"Sweetheart, I Have to Confess"	2006	Writer, with Josh Senter	
"Beautiful Girls"	2006	Writer, with Susan Nirah Jaffee	
"God, That's Good"	2007	Writer, with Josh Senter	
"Now I Know, Don't Be Scared"	2007	Writer, with Susan Nirah Jaffee	
"Opening Doors"	2008	Writer, with Jordon Nardino	

Eli Stone
Title	Year	Credit	Notes
"The Humanitarian"	2008	Writer, with Wendy Mericle	
"Two Ministers"	2008	Writer, with Wendy Mericle	

Mad Men
Title	Year	Credit	Notes
"My Old Kentucky Home"	2009	Writer, with Matthew Weiner	
"Wee Small Hours"	2009	Writer, with Matthew Weiner	
"The Beautiful Girls"	2010	Writer, with Matthew Weiner	

Halt and Catch Fire
Title	Year	Credit	Notes
Play With Friends	2015	Writer, with Christopher Cantwell and Christopher C. Rogers	
The 214's	2014	Writer, with Christopher Cantwell, Christopher C. Rogers, Zack Whedon and Jamie Pachino	
Adventure	2014	Writer, with Christopher Cantwell, Christopher C. Rogers and Jamie Pachino	

American Odyssey
Title	Year	Credit	Notes
Drop King	2015	Writer, with Adam Armus, Nora K Foster and Peter Horton	

Mrs. America
Title	Year	Credit	Notes
Mrs. America	2020	Creator	Miniseries

Klara and the Sun
Title	Year	Credit	Notes
Klara and the Sun	2026	Writer	Film

=== Plays ===
- Between Movements (2012)
