= Search and Ten of Swords =

"Search" and "Ten of Swords"
- Halt and Catch Fire episodes
- Episode nos.: Season 4 Episodes 9/10
- Directed by: Daisy von Scherler Mayer ("Search"); Karyn Kusama ("Ten of Swords")
- Written by: Mark Lafferty ("Search"); Christopher Cantwell and Christopher C. Rogers ("Ten of Swords")
- Original air date: October 14, 2017
- Running time: 47 minutes ("Search"); 52 minutes ("Ten of Swords")

Guest appearances
- "Search": Annabeth Gish as Diane Gould; Molly Ephraim as Alexa Vonn; Matt Malloy as Dr. Lebec; Kathryn Newton as Joanie Clark; Susanna Skaggs as Haley Clark; Charlie Bodin as Trip Kisker III; Frank Hoyt Taylor as Gilson; "Ten of Swords": David Wilson Barnes as Dale Butler; Molly Ephraim as Alexa Vonn; Kathryn Newton as Joanie Clark; Susanna Skaggs as Haley Clark; Charlie Bodin as Trip Kisker III; Frank Hoyt Taylor as Gilson; Carol Kane as Denise; Annabeth Gish as Diane Gould

Episode chronology
← Previous "Goodwill"	Next → —

"Search" and "Ten of Swords" are two episodes of the American television series Halt and Catch Fire that serve as the series finale. They are the ninth and tenth episodes of the fourth season, and the 39th and 40th episodes overall. They originally aired back-to-back on AMC on October 14, 2017. "Search" was written by Mark Lafferty and directed by Daisy von Scherler Mayer. "Ten of Swords" was written by co-creators and showrunners Christopher Cantwell and Christopher C. Rogers, and was directed by Karyn Kusama.

In the episodes, months after the death of Gordon Clark (Scoot McNairy), his friends, collaborators, and family ponder the futures of their personal and professional lives. Joe MacMillan (Lee Pace) and Cameron Howe (Mackenzie Davis) prepare for the relaunch of Comet's website as a web portal, but an unforeseen competitor threatens his company and their relationship. Donna Emerson (Kerry Bishé) must decide whether to accept the vacant managing partner position at her venture capital firm. Meanwhile, as she and Cameron continue to reconcile as friends, they contemplate the possibility of working together again.

"Search" and "Ten of Swords" were watched by 394,000 viewers during their original broadcast. The episodes were acclaimed by critics, who praised the closure reached for the main characters, the emotional scenes between Donna and Cameron, and the uplifting yet ambiguous ending. Several critics ranked the finale of Halt and Catch Fire among the best in TV history.

== Plot ==
=== "Search" ===
At the startup company Comet, several months after the death of his business partner Gordon Clark (Scoot McNairy), Joe MacMillan (Lee Pace) prepares for the relaunch of their website as a web portal, for which his girlfriend Cameron Howe (Mackenzie Davis) led the software development. Joe screens a planned television commercial for the company employees that will accompany the relaunch, and he becomes emotional when seeing footage of Gordon. Later, Joe presents Cameron with a Centipede arcade cabinet, hoping to persuade her to help with one more task: optimize Comet's performance before the web browser Netscape Navigator is released, in hopes of becoming Netscape's default search engine. Cameron reluctantly agrees to stay on longer to help.

Departing for Bangkok, Joanie Clark (Kathryn Newton) bids her mother Donna Emerson (Kerry Bishé) and sister Haley (Susanna Skaggs) farewell at the airport. Diane Gould (Annabeth Gish) stops by Donna's house to tell her she must decide whether or not to succeed Diane as managing partner at their venture capital firm AGGEK. Donna remains unsure what to do. After receiving a clean bill of health, John Bosworth (Toby Huss) tells his wife Diane that he is ready to travel the world together.

Donna and Haley have dinner with Joe and Cameron, continuing Donna's and Cameron's reconcilement as friends. Donna expresses interest in being more involved with the creative side of projects. After Joe shows Haley the commercial, she lashes out at him for including footage of her deceased father and for profiting from Comet, which was founded from her idea; Joe decides not to air the commercial. Haley works up the courage to ask a fast food waitress out on a date but is rejected. Donna decides to accept the managing partner position.

While Joe and Cameron review a beta version of Netscape Navigator that her financier Alexa Vonn (Molly Ephraim) had sent her, they find a hyperlink to Yahoo!, an upstart web portal, is prominently placed on the browser's toolbar. Joe realizes that Yahoo! has struck a deal to become Netscape's default search provider and that Comet is doomed. After one last night together, Joe and Cameron break up. When Donna is announced as the new managing partner at AGGEK, Trip Kisker III (Charlie Bodin) informs her that Yahoo!'s rise will mean the end of Comet, and that AGGEK will explore selling Rover's search algorithm so it can revert to its original purpose, indexing medical records. Donna laughs incredulously while repeating the Yahoo! name. Cameron decides to accompany Alexa on an overseas trip to a technology conference.

=== "Ten of Swords" ===
Joanie calls Donna from Bangkok and tells her mother a story of her travels. Realizing Comet cannot compete with Yahoo!, Joe sells the company. He visits a tarot card reader, Denise (Carol Kane), hoping to understand what the future holds. As he leaves, he is nearly hit by a car before encountering a former colleague from IBM, Dale Butler (David Wilson Barnes), who tells Joe he is excited to see what he does next. Donna renames AGGEK to "Symphonic Ventures" and revamps their work culture to be more relaxed and inclusive. After an unsuccessful business trip, Cameron ends her professional relationship with Alexa. Planning to leave California, Cameron packs up her Airstream trailer; Bosworth visits her to offer words of encouragement. She stops at Joe's apartment to drop off his belongings but finds that he has already moved out.

Saying her goodbyes, Cameron stops by Donna's house, where Donna is preparing to host a cocktail party for women in the tech industry. When Haley's computer hard drive crashes, Cameron stays and tries to help Donna recover a school project from it. Cameron proposes that she and Donna work together again, which catches Donna by surprise. Later that evening at the party, Donna gives a speech reflecting on her experiences as a female in the tech industry, during which she refers to Cameron as "my last and best partner". The speech culminates with Cameron accidentally falling in the pool. The two later visit the former office of Mutiny and Comet, and envision what it would be like to work together again at a hypothetical company named "Phoenix"; dreaming up the history of the venture, the two decide it would ultimately fail but that their friendship would endure this time. Haley listens to Gordon's self-affirmation tapes in her bedroom. The following morning, before Cameron's planned cross-country road trip, she has breakfast with Donna at a diner. While paying the check, Donna has an epiphany; rushing out of the diner, she tells Cameron, "I have an idea."

Joe returns home to Armonk, New York, to become a humanities teacher at a school. Addressing his students with the same words he spoke to Cameron's college class in the series pilot, he says, "Let me start by asking a question."

== Production ==
Schedule of production deadlines for episodes
	"Search"	"Ten of Swords"
Story beats	April 21, 2017	May 5, 2017
Outline	May 8, 2017	May 22, 2017
Revised outline	May 15, 2017	May 30, 2017
Rough draft	May 29, 2017	June 13, 2017
1st draft	June 5, 2017	June 20, 2017
2nd draft	June 12, 2017	June 27, 2017
Preparations	June 21, 2017	July 5, 2017
Filming starts	June 30, 2017	July 14, 2017

=== Writing ===
For the scene in "Ten of Swords" in which Donna hosts a cocktail party at her house for women in the tech industry, co-creators and showrunners Christopher Cantwell and Christopher C. Rogers wrote a two-page monologue for the character to discuss her experiences in the industry as a woman. Rogers called it the most difficult part of creating the finale, as they did not want to "overtly moralize". He said that throughout the series, they "really tried to live [their] principles... versus advertising them", but that he was still afraid her speech would come across as preachy. However, the duo felt they had earned the opportunity to make "textual what should be subtextual" because of Donna's journey from housewife in the first season to ambitious businesswoman heading a venture capital firm in the final season. Rogers said, "The knowledge of that journey and the bumps on the road afford her the ability to speak about it in a personal way."

Cantwell said the intent of the Phoenix scene was for Donna and Cameron to recognize a pattern in their behaviors: the excitement in pursuing a new idea and coalescing around it but ultimately harming their interpersonal relationships in the process. By acknowledging how their hypothetical venture could have failed, the characters gain what Cantwell called "a new foundation to stand on, as opposed to where they were before that". The writers briefly entertained the idea of writing a conclusion that depicted the characters' fates in the present day, but they decided not to due to logistics with aging makeup and because they felt it would be disingenuous to the show since a vital component of its story was the characters "not knowing what's coming around the corner".

The original scripted ending called for Joe to return to IBM, but Cantwell deemed it "much darker and melancholic" and it was scrapped.

=== Casting ===
David Wilson Barnes reprised the character of Dale Butler for "Ten of Swords"; he previously appeared in the first two episodes of the series before the character was written out when the story went in a different direction.

Carol Kane portrayed the fortune teller Denise. Her appearance was the result of the producers requesting the casting directors find "someone like Carol Kane" for the character, to which they replied, "How about Carol Kane?"

=== Filming ===
At the end of "Search", Donna laughs incredulously as she repeats the website name "Yahoo!". For the scene, AMC's business affairs department prohibited the producers from having Donna yodel; the Yahoo! name had been yodeled as part of the company's television marketing in the 1990s.

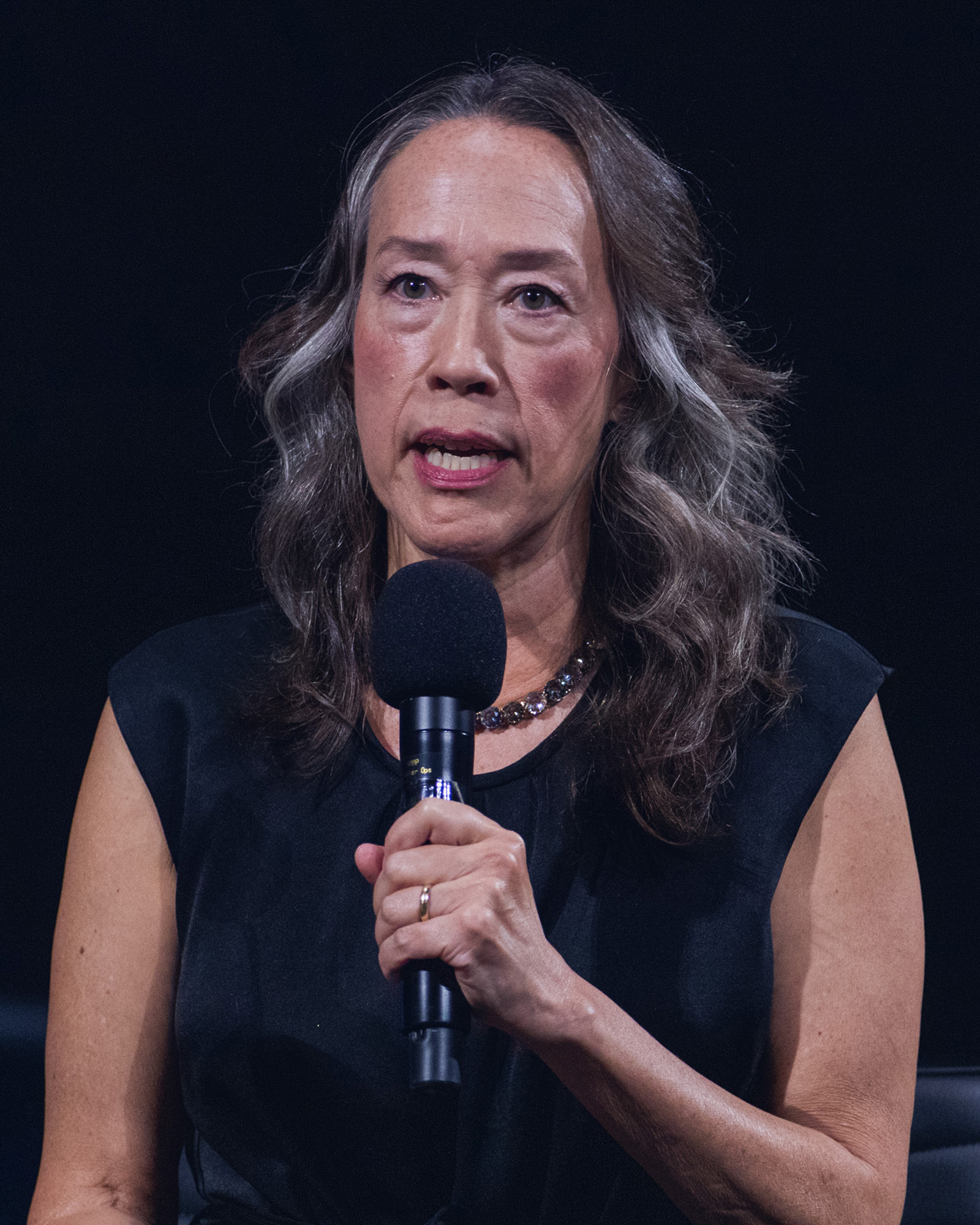
Karyn Kusama, director of "Ten of Swords"

"Ten of Swords" was directed by Karyn Kusama. Having directed an episode in each of the three prior seasons, Kusama was asked by executive producer Melissa Bernstein to return for a fourth-season episode; Bernstein said she had "been begging Karyn to direct all season". Kusama initially faced scheduling conflicts while working on the film Destroyer, but according to Bernstein: "Eventually, I think she just folded to wanting to be a part of bringing this series to a close. It just felt right."

Production on the episode, and thus the series, wrapped in late July 2017.

==== Cocktail party scene ====
The cocktail party scene at Donna's house was filmed at a mid-century modern-style home in northeastern Atlanta that was scouted by Kusama, director of photography Evans Brown, and production designer Ola Maslik. It was chosen for its minimalist architecture that could be easily decorated to reflect Donna's upscale tastes and the period setting. The staff also thought it would be easier to shoot the swimming pool on location than to replicate it on a sound stage. Due to a slope in the lawn, Maslik and set designer Lance Totten built a wooden platform on top of it and covered it with sod, giving the lawn a flat appearance. At the risk of it collapsing, all non-essential personnel were barred from standing on it.

Since the cocktail party was set during dusk, the crew were hoping for overcast conditions for optimal lighting. Instead, it was a bright day with almost no cloud cover, and temperatures in Atlanta reached 94 °F (34 °C), a high for that month; Brown called the combination of conditions "the worst nightmare". Shooting began at 6:55 p.m. and lasted four hours; with only an hour of natural dusk, the crew had to simulate it for three hours of the shoot. To filter the sunlight, key grip Bill Merrill floated a large helium-inflated, mattress-shaped balloon called a "grip cloud" above the yard, while charcoal "solids" were set up on the west side of the yard to reduce lighting. The crew also adjusted the balance of ambient outdoor lighting with interior lighting coming from the house; increasing the interior lighting gave the exterior a darker appearance on camera.

The crew were challenged once the sun had set, as it became more difficult to add light to the darkening setting than it had been reducing light when it was brighter. Since close-ups are easier to color grade in post-production than wide shots, the crew waited to film Bishé's coverage until the end of the shoot. For that segment, gaffer Rick Crank used a 120-foot-tall condor to light the treeline behind her. Bishé began filming her coverage at 9:09 p.m., by which point the only people on set were the cameramen, Kusama, Rogers, and the homeowner. Bishé said that when she was surrounded by people earlier in the shoot, it was easy to recite her character's speech multiple times. For her coverage, though, she found it more difficult and wished that some of the extras had been retained; she joked: "I was trying to look at a flowerpot here, and then there's a grip scratching his butt over there, and I'm like, Oy. This was so meaningful earlier."

About 20 feet of tracks were laid out on the west side of the lawn to accommodate a 15-foot SuperTechnoCrane, which was suspended over the pool for sweeping shots. For Cameron's fall into the pool at the end of the scene, the crew did a test run with a body double before filming Davis, who only required one take.

==== Diner scene ====
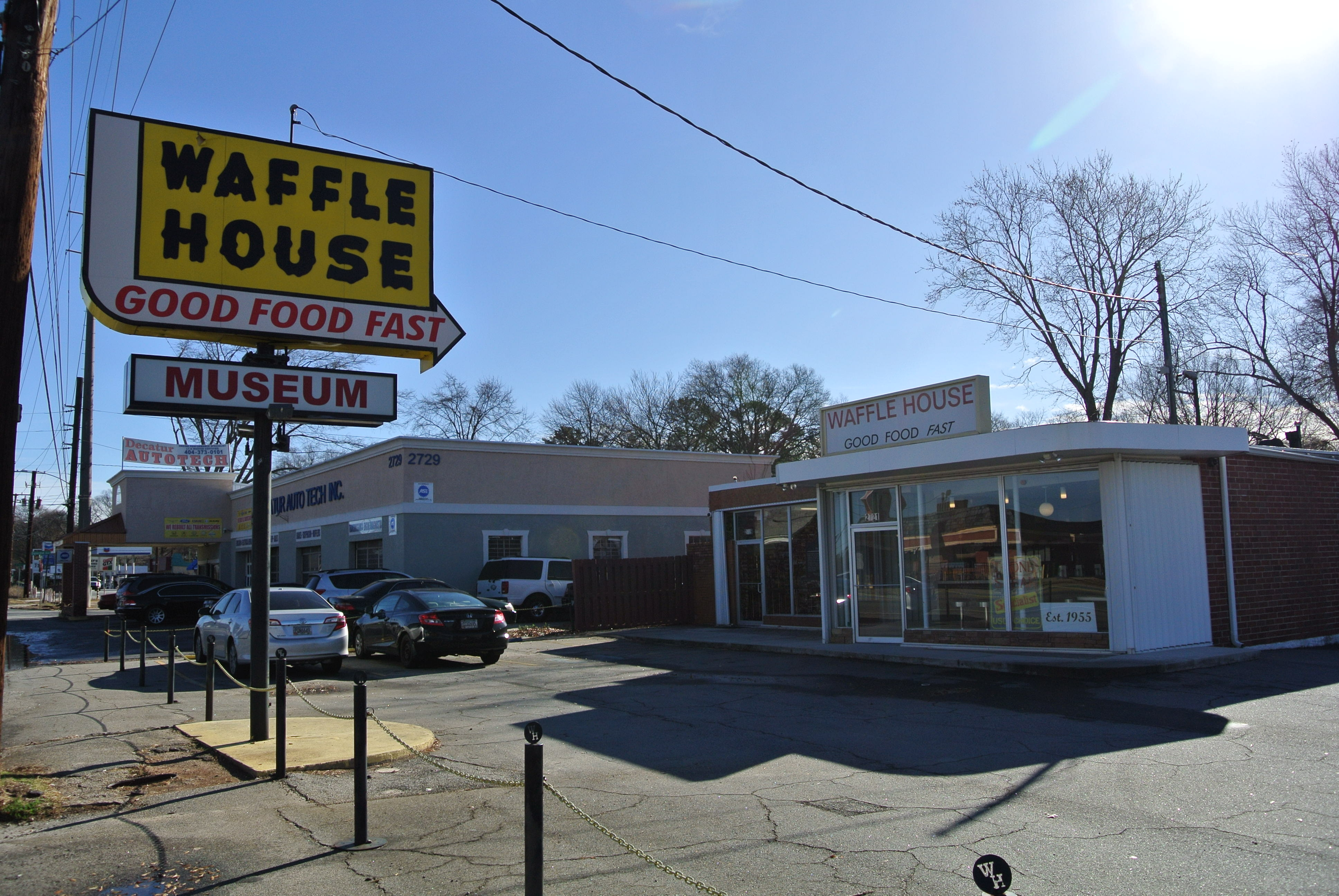
The diner scene featuring Donna and Cameron was filmed at the Waffle House Museum in Avondale Estates, Georgia.

Donna's and Cameron's diner scene featured in the closing moments of the series finale was filmed at the Waffle House Museum. Donna's idea at the end of the scene is never revealed, but the producers ensured that each camera shot in the diner showed an analog aspect of life for which there would be a future digital innovation. Some of the shots included a person reading a newspaper, a jukebox, a waitress taking an order, and a cash register. Regarding Donna's inspiration, Kusama told Bishé: "It's everything. It's not one idea. It's all of the ideas." Bishé recited the line "I have an idea" several different ways during filming, and said that her favorite variation was an apologetic one to Cameron."

=== Production design ===
Donna's house needed to convey an elevated status to reflect the character's emergence as a businesswoman. For the production design, Maslik chose a 1990s color palette of dusky rose and emerald green, the latter being used in the kitchen backsplash, blinds, furniture, and tablecloths. For the cocktail party scene, the yard was decorated with paper lanterns, bouquets of off-white peonies, and lights floating in the pool to impart a "serene sense of luxury". For the party, Donna's costume design, makeup, and hair design were conceived as complements to the dusky rose color used in her home decor. Costume designer Jennifer Bryan selected a deep coral "chic silk-wrap dress" for the character, while head of makeup Donna Premick used earth tones of rust and burnt oranges in the makeup to complement the dress color. Hair designer Joani Yarbrough collaborated with Bishé to develop Donna's hairstyle, and they decided to lighten it from a deep red to a light copper.

=== Music ===
The closing sequence of "Ten of Swords" is soundtracked by the song "Solsbury Hill" by Peter Gabriel. Originally, "Take Me Home" by Phil Collins was written into the script, but due to the high cost of licensing it, the producers opted for a different song; Rogers advocated for a track by the Clash for a while. While cutting the final sequence, Kusama and editor Rob Komatsu consulted playlists that the music supervisors had prepared for the fourth season, and decided to try out "Solsbury Hill". Cantwell said the song "electrified the final sequence of the show in such an amazing way that we loved it as soon as we saw it".

Rationalizing the song choice, music supervisor Thomas Golubić said, "it allowed us to land on Joe in a way that gave us a sense of like—of course he's a teacher. Like, of course he's trying to find the next generation that will move those things forward. And there's a nostalgia with 'Solsbury Hill'." Analyzing the final scene, Miles Surrey of The Ringer said that the use of the song and "The new academic setting... underscores that Joe is finally ready to let go of the past and embrace the next chapter of his life."

The music featured in "Search" is:

- "Fanfare for the Common Man" – Aaron Copland
- "Seether" – Veruca Salt
- "Sittin' and Thinkin'" – Charlie Rich
- "Hey Paula" – Paul & Paula

The music featured in "Ten of Swords" is:

- "Toon Explosion" – Music Collective
- "New Madrid" – Uncle Tupelo
- "Beercan" – Beck
- "Harvest Moon" – Neil Young
- "Solsbury Hill" – Peter Gabriel

== Reception ==
=== Ratings ===
The original broadcast of the two episodes was watched by 394,000 viewers and received a 0.12 rating in the 18–49 age demographic, according to Nielsen data. This represented a 0.04 rating increase from the previous week's episode.

=== Critical reaction ===
The series finale was acclaimed by critics. In a five-star review, Kathryn VanArendonk of Vulture called the Phoenix scene "one of the most beautiful things I've seen in a long, long time" and said, "the vision of the two women at the end of this series, committed to each other and the desire to make something together, is the most optimistic thing I can imagine for right now." Dennis Perkins of The A.V. Club rated the two episodes an "A" collectively, saying, "The series has become such a deeply human thing itself over the years that every development in 'Search' lands with an inevitable and affecting grace." Perkins called the scene in "Ten of Swords" in which Bosworth reassures Cameron a "breathtakingly warm interlude" and said the second half of the episode features "a series of huge swings, and creators and episode writers Chris Cantwell and Chris Rogers connect on all of them". James Poniewozik of The New York Times said the Phoenix sequence was a "remarkably staged scene, unusually theater-like for a series that operates in the language of cinematic realism". He praised the decision to leave Donna's idea ambiguous, saying: "The point is the inspiration, the work, the act of creation. The idea will be whatever it is. It'll probably end up a failure. It'll be great." Alison Herman of The Ringer said: "Rather than offer a happily-ever-after guarantee, what Halt and Catch Fire instead offers is a benevolent, open-ended sense of confident ambiguity... We sense that Donna and Cameron can endure, even if their latest business venture doesn't, and we sense that Joe has finally found some measure of inner peace." Ben Travers of IndieWire gave the episode an "A", praising a line from Donna's speech at the party ("The one constant is you. It's us. The project gets us to the people.") by saying: "What an incredible line to deliver for a series that's become such an honest, meditative look at people more than their product. Moreover, the episode itself earns the sentiment." Matt Brennan of Paste rated the finale a 9.5/10, and called the final four installments of the show a "gorgeous, stirring series of episodes" that "appear as if lifted to another plane". He called the Phoenix scene "so quiet, so simple, so delicately drawn and deeply felt, that it demands no description", while judging the cocktail party scene to be "the sequence for which [he will] remember Davis and Bishé's remarkable two-step, written with such sincere affection it deserves to be quoted at length".

Daniel Fienberg of The Hollywood Reporter said, "The doubling of the concluding episodes paid off", and that the second one "was almost non-stop tears for [him]". He opined that "this was exactly how the show should have concluded". J.M. Suarez of PopMatters rated the finale a 9/10 and said that the show "culminat[ing] in one of the best series finalés in years is a testament to the thoughtful work of its creators". She called the cocktail party scene one of the series's "most brilliant sequences", and praised the Phoenix scene as "incredibly moving" because "Bishé and Davis beautifully exemplify the range of emotions it inspires". Suarez concluded by saying that the show's "place in television history is secure; this is a series that'll continue to be discovered, and inspire others". Sean T. Collins, writing for Decider, called Halt and Catch Fire one of the best series of all time, saying, "Judging from the reaction to its two-part series finale this weekend, that's uncontroversial now". He praised Donna's speech as "heartbreakingly relevant" and the Phoenix scene as a "tremendous imaginative leap" that was one of the show's most memorable scenes. Alan Sepinwall of Uproxx called the finale "a masterful conclusion demonstrating the full range of the powers everyone on both sides of the camera" had. He lauded the decision to build the finale around the idea of two friends wanting to work together again without showing the viewer their idea. Sepinwall said that the diner sequence was a "gorgeous climactic scene" but that it should have been the actual ending to the episode instead of Joe's scene, noting "just about everything else in these two episodes was perfect". Chancellor Agard of Entertainment Weekly rated the episodes an "A" collectively, calling them "beautifully satisfying episodes that perfectly sum up the show's central themes while also bringing the characters to their poignant end points".

=== Accolades ===
Entertainment Weekly ranked "Ten of Swords" the ninth-best TV episode of 2017, while Decider included it on its list of the year's best episodes. Vulture ranked the episode's use of "Solsbury Hill" the third-best musical moment on TV in 2017. The A.V. Club included the finale's "Phoenix" scene on its list of the best TV scenes of the year, and Film School Rejects ranked the diner scene eighth on its list of the year's best TV scenes.

=== Legacy ===
Several publications ranked Halt and Catch Fire's finale among the best TV series finales. Hank Stuever of The Washington Post ranked it 11th-best on his list of finales since 2005, saying, "the show ended in a way that was both melancholy and hopeful" and that "the final note is one of quiet optimism". Danielle Turchiano of Variety included "Ten of Swords" on her list, writing, "While it has gone unwritten as to whether they are happier and healthier characters outside of that uber-competitive world, it was nice to see them end on a high note, especially when Donna... called out the true heart and soul of the show, her partnership with Cameron". IndieWire ranked it 6th on its list of the best finales of the 21st century, saying: "'Ten of Swords' kept its focus on what made the series great: the people and their dreams. It hinted at what they could do without forcing concrete conclusions, as the writers recognized that dreaming is the fun part" for the protagonists. TVLine ranked it the 10th-best series finale in TV history, saying that Joe stepping aside "was exactly what was needed to bring the series full circle", while highlighting the renewal of Cameron's and Donna's partnership, which the website considered "the very best part of the show".

The Ringer ranked "Ten of Swords" at number 27 on a list of the 40 best TV finales of the 21st century; Miles Surrey said that Donna's and Cameron's final scene was "a lovely end for both characters on the show: ambiguous and optimistic in equal measure". TheWrap included Halt and Catch Fire on a list of 21 series whose finales "stuck the landing", writing that the ending with Cameron and Donna was fitting and "the absolute perfect grace note". Carrie Wittmer, writing for Business Insider, included the series finale on her list of the best of all time, saying that it "emphasizes [the characters'] humanity in moments that reflect the show's first two seasons, when the characters were fighting to be the first and the best in the tech world without losing themselves". Mental Floss's book The Curious Viewer, edited by Jennifer M. Wood, included "Ten of Swords" among its collection of the best TV series finales of all time, writing that the episode "sends the show's trinity of remaining major characters in promising new directions, even as they all come to terms with the fact that they can never again recapture what they once had". Andrew Trahan of Best Life ranked it 14th on his list of the best series finales, calling Donna's delivery of "I have an idea" to Cameron "one of the all-time greatest finale lines".

Film School Rejects ranked "Ten of Swords" the 23rd-best TV episode of the 2010s.
