= Christopher C. Rogers =

American television creator

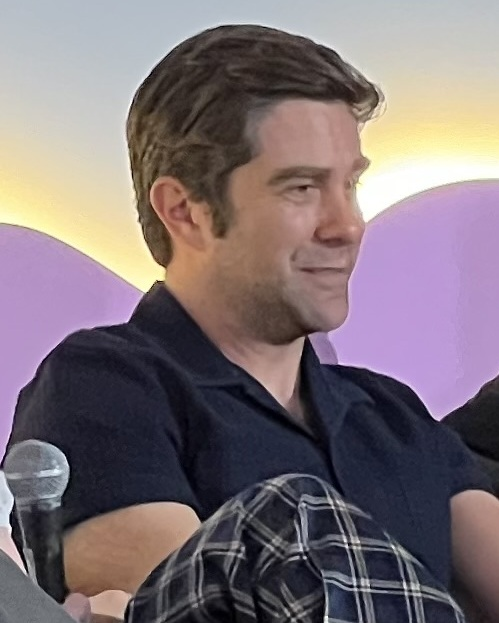
- Rogers at the 10th anniversary panel for Halt and Catch Fire
- Born: Winchester, Virginia
- Education: University of Mary Washington; University of California, Los Angeles
- Occupations: Screenwriter and producer
- Children: 2

Christopher C. Rogers is an American film and television writer and producer. He began his career in magazines at The Atlantic in Washington D.C., before relocating to Los Angeles to work for Condé Nast Magazines.

Along with his writing partner, Christopher Cantwell, Rogers created and executive produced the critically acclaimed AMC series Halt and Catch Fire. It aired in the United States from June 1, 2014, to October 14, 2017, spanning four seasons and 40 episodes. In 2021, the series was named as one of the best 100 shows of 21st century by the BBC. Halt and Catch Fire appeared on several rankings of 21st century television series. Thrillist called it the best TV series to air all of its episodes in the 2010s; writer Esther Zuckerman said: "perhaps more than any other show that began during this decade, Halt and Catch Fire captured the agony of trying to navigate a world where it's easier and easier to hide behind a computer screen. In documenting the beginning of the boom that brought us to where we are, [Cantwell and Rogers] created characters who reflected universal anxieties through their longing."

He is co-author of The Knoll, which placed on The Black List and, in partnership with Cantwell, has been named one of Variety's "10 TV Scribes to Watch". He is a graduate of the WGA Showrunner Training Program. He was represented by Chris Huvane at Management 360 until 2022.

He served as co-showrunner and an executive producer of Amazon's TV series Paper Girls, an adaptation of Brian K. Vaughan's graphic novel of the same name. It stars Sofia Rosinsky, Camryn Jones, Riley Lai Nelet, and Fina Strazza.

== Writing credits ==
- "I/O" (Season 1, Episode 1)
- "FUD" (Season 1, Episode 2)
- "1984" (Season 1, Episode 10)
- "SETI" (Season 2, Episode 1)
- "Working for the Clampdown" (Season 2, Episode 7)
- "Heaven Is a Place" (Season 2, Episode 10)
- "Valley of the Heart's Delight" (Season 3, Episode 1)
- "NeXT" (Season 3, Episode 10)
- "So It Goes" (Season 4, Episode 1)
- "Ten of Swords" (Season 4, Episode 10)
- "Weird Al Is Dead" (Season 1, Episode 2)
- "Matinee" (Season 1, Episode 6)
- "Some Kind of Burping Trash Hole" Season 1, Episode 7)
- "Watch Face" (Season 2, Episode 3)
- "What Else Can You Do?" Season 2, Episode 7)

== Personal life ==
Chris was born in Winchester, Virginia, and attended John Handley High School. He graduated from University of Mary Washington. He is married, with two daughters and resides in Silverlake.
