= American Airlines Flight 1 =

American Airways Flight 1 may refer to one of the following airline incidents:

Listed chronologically

- American Airlines Flight 1 (1936), a Douglas DC-2 that crashed near Goodwin, Arkansas, on 14 January 1936
- American Airlines Flight 1 (1941), a Douglas DC-3 that crashed near Lawrence Station, Ontario, on 30 October 1941
- American Airlines Flight 1 (1962), a Boeing 707 that crashed after a rudder failure just out of New York on 1 March 1962

== See also ==
- Flight 1 (disambiguation)
- List of American Airlines accidents and incidents
