= China Aviation Museum =

National aviation museum in Beijing, China

Coordinates: 40°10′59.4″N 116°21′24.3″E

Chinese Aviation Museum
- 中国航空博物馆
- Established: 1989
- Location: Datangshan, Beijing, China
- Type: Aviation museum
- Website: zghkbwg.mil.cn chn-am.com (former)

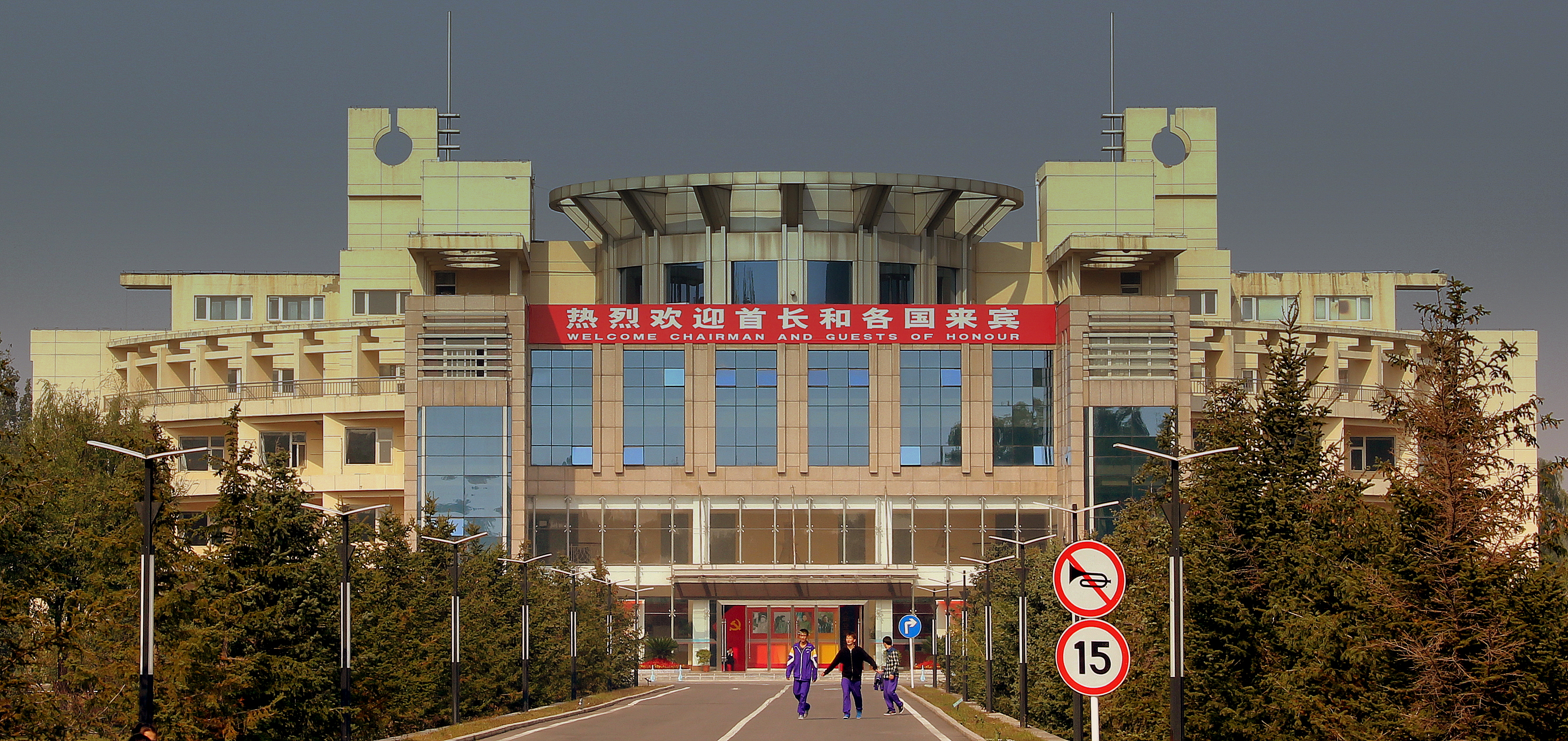
The main building of Chinese Aviation Museum

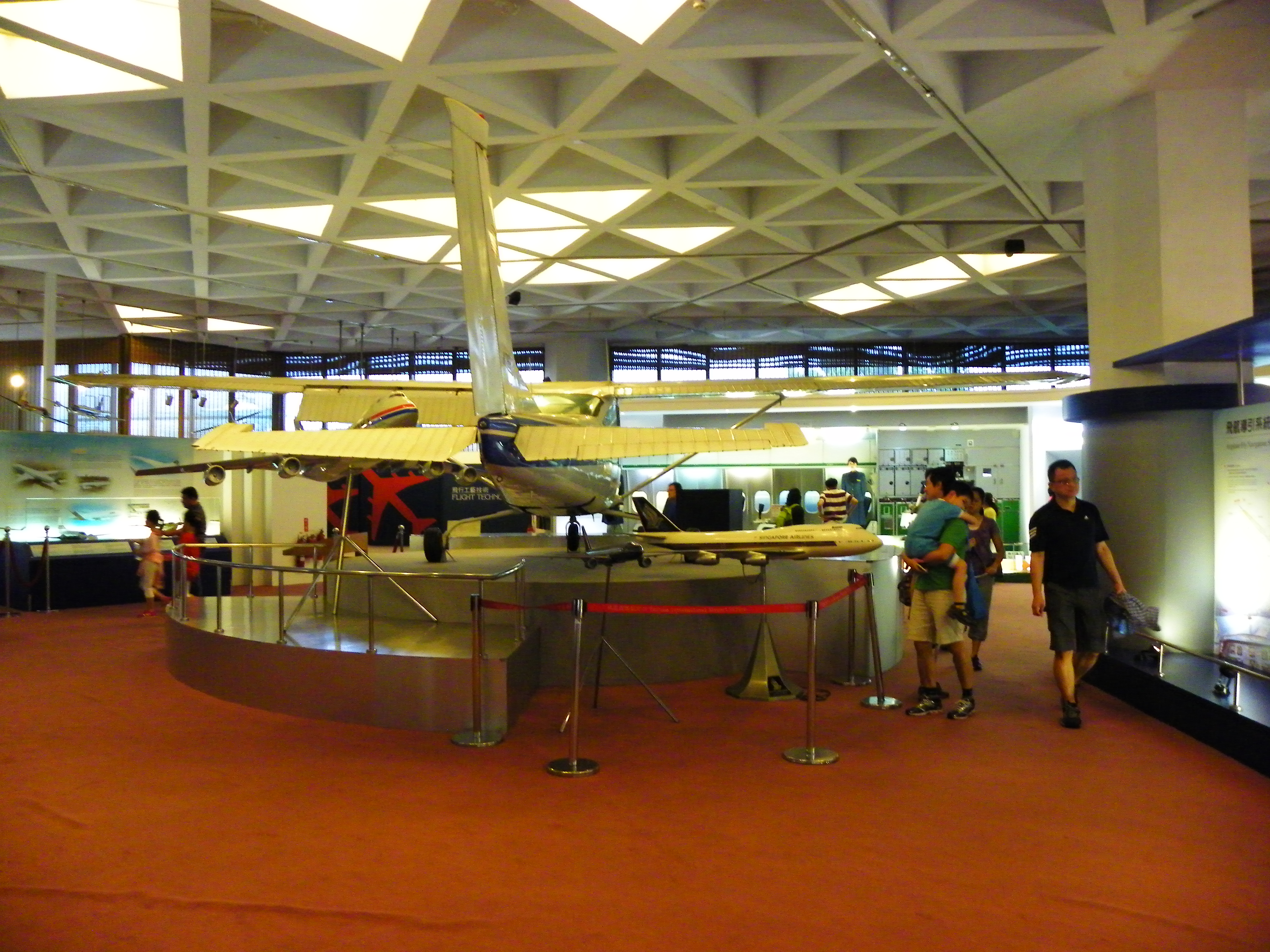
Visitors in civil aviation area, 1st floor of Chinese Aviation Museum

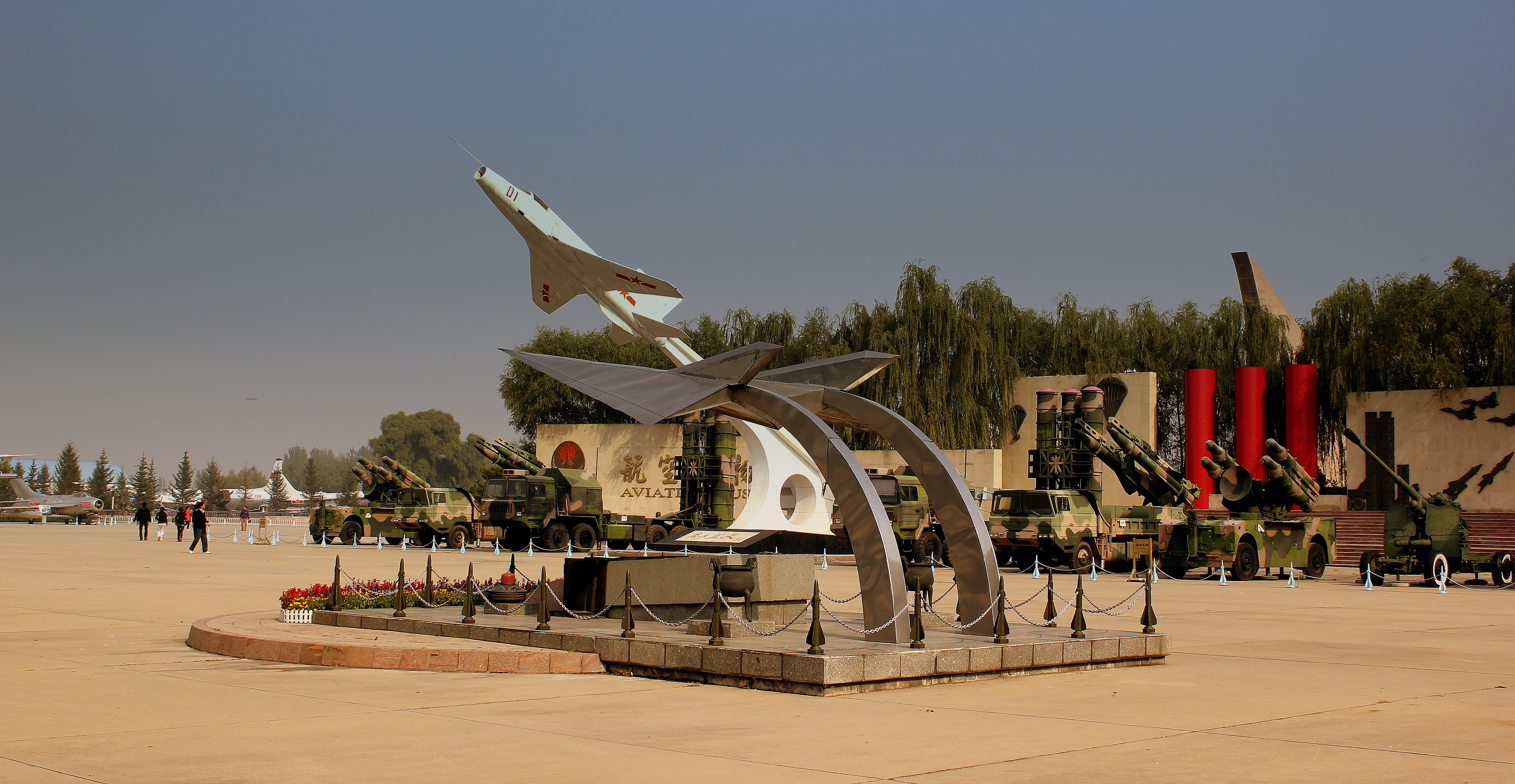
Rocket artillery at outdoor area

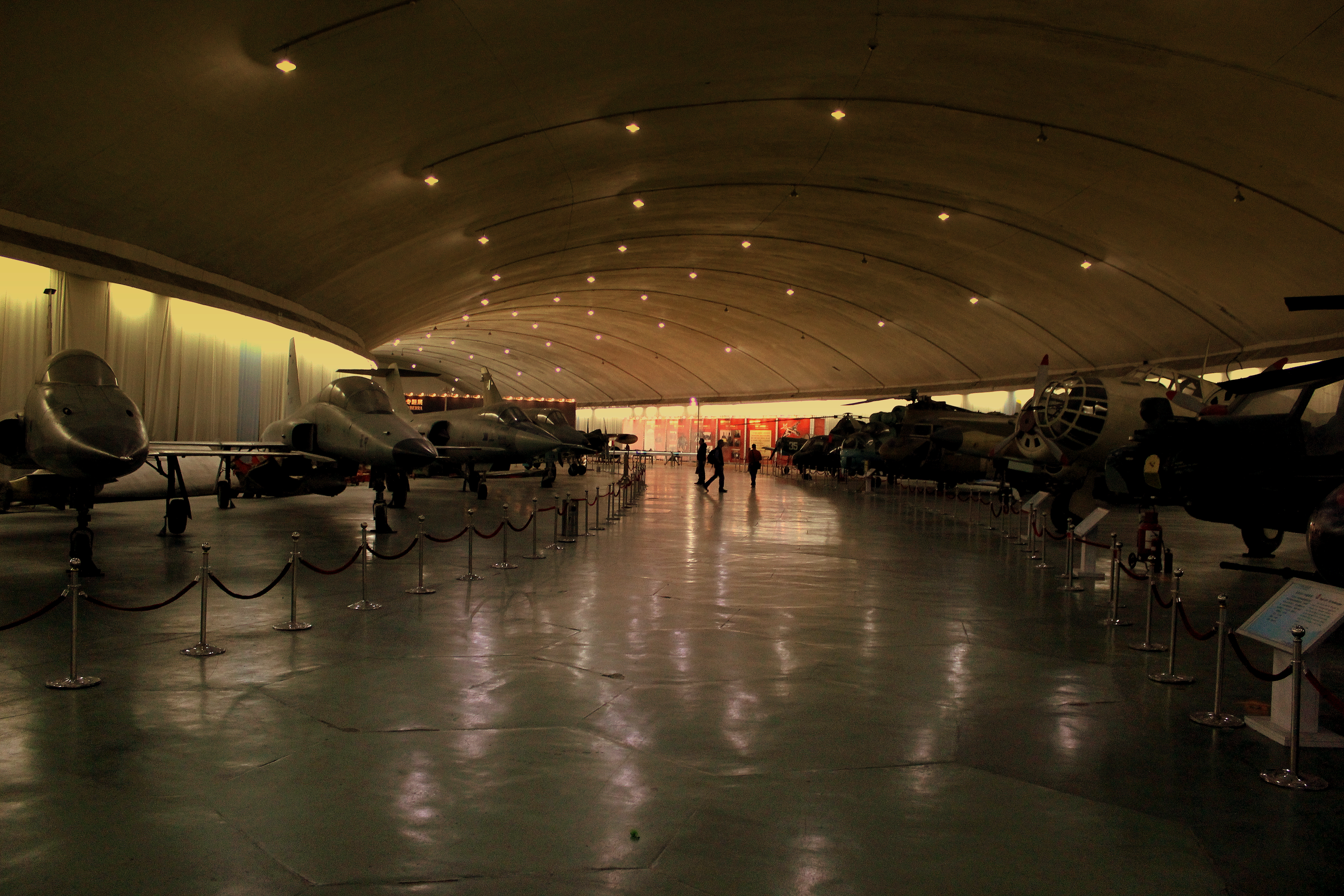
The underground bunker system

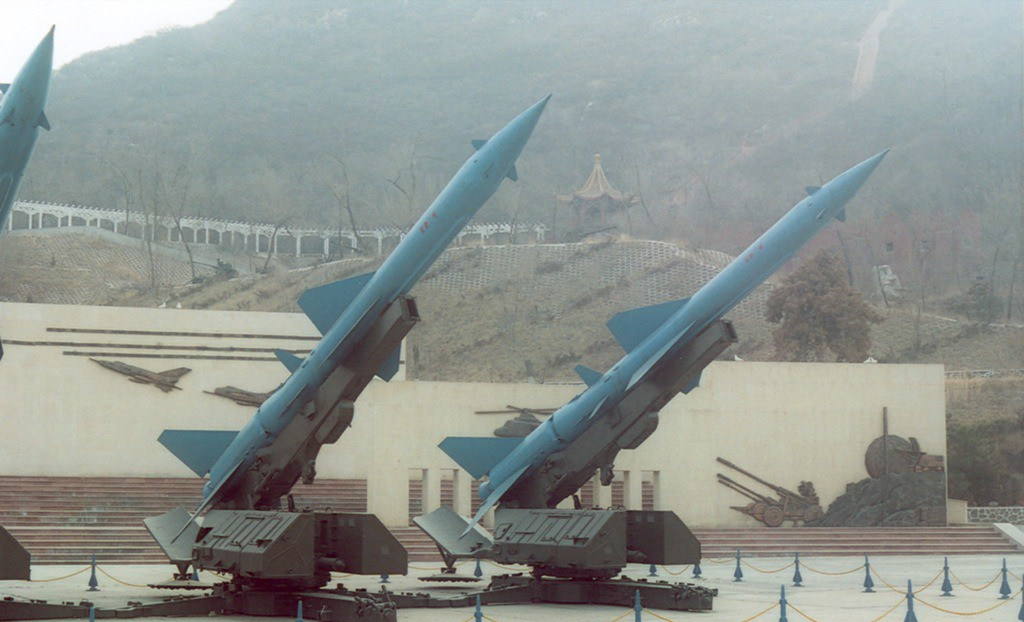
Chinese-built S-75 Dvina missiles, with the Chinese designation HQ-2 are displayed at the museum.

The China Aviation Museum (Chinese: 中国航空博物馆; pinyin: Zhōngguó Hángkōng Bówùguǎn) is an aviation museum located in Beijing, China. It is affiliated with the People's Liberation Army Air Force and co-sponsored by the Aviation Industry Corporation of China. The museum is a national first-class museum accredited by the National Cultural Heritage Administration.

The China Aviation Museum was first opened to the public on 11 November 1989, to celebrate the 40th anniversary of the founding of the People's Liberation Army Air Force. Part of the museum is located inside a cave in the side of Datangshan Mountain. The cavern was originally part of the tunnels and underground bunker system of Shahezhen Airbase, and is 586 metres (1,923 feet) long by 11 metres (36 feet) high by 40 metres (130 feet) wide.

== Collection ==
There are more than 200 aircraft on display, with an emphasis on the Korean War and the Cold War. The collection includes many unique machines, including a 1903 Wright Flyer replica.

Aircraft on display include:

- Aérospatiale Alouette III helicopter
- Bell UH-1H Huey helicopter
- de Havilland Canada DHC-2 Beaver
- de Havilland Mosquito
- Douglas DC-8-21 (N220RB) once used by ORBIS International for eye surgery from 1982 to 1994
- Fairchild PT-19
- Harbin Z-5
- Harbin/CHDRI Z-6
- Hawker Siddeley Trident
- Ilyushin Il-18V four-engine turbo-prop transport that was Mao Zedong's personal VIP aircraft
- Ilyushin Il-2 Shturmovik
- Lavochkin La-11
- Lenin biplane
- Lisunov Li-2
- Lockheed D-21 Mach 3+ reconnaissance drone
- Lockheed F-104 Ex Italian Air Force
- Martin RB-57D Canberra
- MiG-9
- MiG-17 fighter (Cut-away)
- MiG-23 Ex Egypt Air Force
- Mil Mi-4
- Mil Mi-8
- Mil Mi-24
- Nanchang A-5
- Nanchang CJ-5
- Nanchang CJ-6
- Nanchang J-12
- Nanjing Aviation College AD200 canard ultralight two seater student project sport aircraft
- North American P-51 Mustang
- North American F-86 Ex Pakistan Air Force
- Northrop F-5E
- Northrop F-5F
- Shenyang F-5
- Shenyang F-6
- Shenyang F-7
- Tachikawa Ki-55
- Tupolev Tu-2
- Tupolev Tu-124
- Vickers Viscount
- Yakovlev Yak-11
- Yakovlev Yak-17UTI
- Many bombs, guns and radar systems

== See also ==
- List of aerospace museums
