= Flight 901A =

Flight 901A may refer to one of two airline flights which crashed, both with fatal results:

- Paradise Airlines Flight 901A, crashed on the city of Lake Tahoe, California, United States, March 1, 1964, killing all 85 occupants.
- Vieques Air Link Flight 901A, crashed into the Atlantic Ocean off Vieques, Puerto Rico, August 2, 1984, killing all 9 occupants.

== See also ==
- Flight 901 (disambiguation)
- Flight 191 (disambiguation)
- Flight 1 / 001 (disambiguation)
- Flight 101 (disambiguation)
