= Flight 1 =

Flight 1 or Flight 001 may refer to one of the following airline incidents, listed chronologically:

- American Airlines Flight 1 (1936), a Douglas DC-2 that crashed near Goodwin, Arkansas, on 14 January 1936
- TWA Flight 1, a Douglas DC-2 that crashed in Pennsylvania on 7 April 1936
- Northwest Airlines Flight 1, a Lockheed Super Electra that suffered a fire on board and crashed in Montana on 13 January 1939
- American Airlines Flight 1 (1941), a Douglas DC-3 that crashed near Lawrence Station, Ontario, on 30 October 1941
- Transair Sweden Flight 001, crashed near Ndola, Northern Rhodesia (present-day Zambia), on 18 September 1961
- American Airlines Flight 1 (1962), a Boeing 707 that crashed after a rudder failure just out of New York on 1 March 1962
- ČSA Flight 001, crashed in Czechoslovakia on 28 July 1976
- Loftleiðir Flight 001, crashed on approach to Colombo, Sri Lanka, on 15 November 1978
- Qantas Flight 1, a Boeing 747 that overran a runway in Bangkok on 23 September 1999
- Zeusch Aviation Flight 1, a Beechcraft Super King Air that crashed after takeoff at London Southend Airport on 13 July 2025

== Other uses ==
- "Flight 1" (Mad Men), a 2008 episode of the television show Mad Men, centering in part on the above noted 1962 American Airlines crash
- SpaceX COTS Demo Flight 1, a test flight on 8 December 2010
- Starship flight test 1, the unsuccessful maiden flight of SpaceX Starship and Super Heavy on April 20, 2023

== See also ==
- List of flight number 1 by airline
