= Aeroflot Flight 101 =

Aeroflot Flight 101 may refer to two aviation accidents:

- Aeroflot Flight 101/X-20, an Ilyushin Il-18 crash in 1965
- Aeroflot Flight 101/435, an Antonov An-24 hijacking incident in 1985
