= AA1 =

Aa-1 or AA1 may refer to:

- USS T-1 (SS-52), a US Navy submarine also known as USS AA-1
- K-5 (missile), an early Soviet air-to-air missile, NATO reporting name AA-1 'Alkali'
- Grumman American AA-1, a light aircraft
- PRR AA1, a Pennsylvania Railroad electric locomotive
- Phoenix Wright: Ace Attorney, a video game
- Acer Aspire One, a netbook computer
- American Airlines Flight 1 (disambiguation), various flights
- Aa1, the second highest credit rating given by Moody's Investors Service
- Bavarian AA I, a steam locomotive
- 1997 AA1, the alternate name for 8735 Yoshiosakai, an outer main-belt asteroid
- Hieroglyph that represents a sieve or placenta: 𓐍 (Gardiner's designated symbol AA1)
