= Flight 101 =

Flight 101 is an airline flight number that refers to multiple aviation accidents and incidents. This includes:

Listed chronologically

- National Airlines Flight 101, a Douglas DC-6 which crashed in New Jersey on 11 February 1952
- Aeroflot Flight 101/X-20, an Ilyushin Il-18 which crashed near Alma-Ata Airport on 3 January 1965
- Air India Flight 101, a Boeing 707 which accidentally flew into Mont Blanc in France on 24 January 1966
- TABSO Flight 101, an Ilyushin Il-18 which crashed near Bratislava in Slovakia on 24 November 1966
- Aeroflot Flight 101/435, an Antonov An-24 which was hijacked by the co-pilot on 19 December 1985
- Fine Air Flight 101, a McDonnell Douglas DC-8 which crashed after take-off from Miami on 7 August 1997
- Flightline Flight 101, a Swearingen Metroliner which crashed on 10 October 2001
- Chalk's Ocean Airways Flight 101, a Grumman G-73 Mallard which crashed in Miami on 19 December 2005
- Yeti Airlines Flight 101, a DHC-6 Twin Otter that Crashed on final approach on 8 October 2008
- Polish Air Force Flight 101, a Tupolev Tu-154 which crashed on approach on 10 April 2010
- Agni Air Flight 101, a Dornier 228 which crashed after take-off from Kathmandu on 24 August 2010

== See also ==
- The Secret Agent on Flight 101, a 1967 volume of The Hardy Boys Mystery Stories
- STS-101, a successful Space Shuttle mission in May 2000
