= Flight 20 =

Flight 20 may refer to:

- Capital Airlines Flight 20, crashed on 18 January 1960
- Aeroflot Flight 20/101, crashed on 4 January 1965
- Taquan Air Flight 20, crashed on 20 May 2019
