= Flight 435 =

Flight 435 may refer to:

- Invicta International Airlines Flight 435, crashed on 10 April 1973
- Aeroflot Flight 435, crashed on 19 December 1985
