= American Airlines Flight 1 (1962) =

Crash in New York City with no survivors

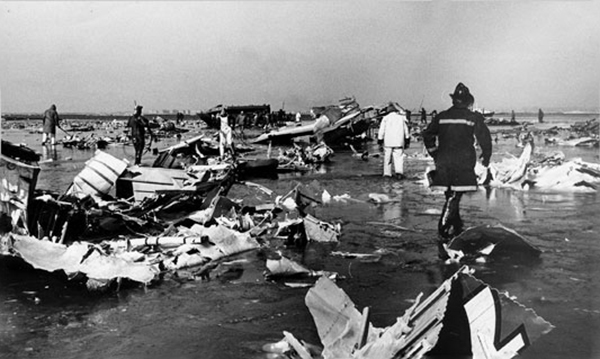
- Wreckage of the aircraft in Jamaica Bay

Accident
- Date: March 1, 1962
- Summary: Improper maintenance, manufacturing defect leading to mechanical failure
- Site: Jamaica Bay, New York, U.S.; 40°37′4″N 73°50′13″W

Aircraft
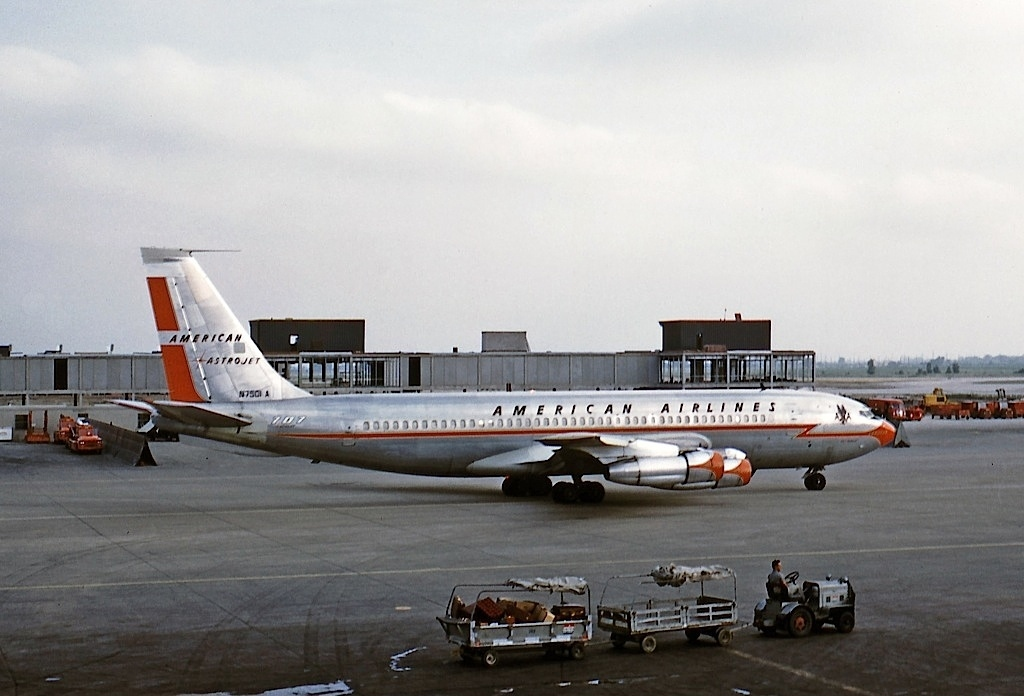
- An American Airlines Boeing 707-123B, similar to one involved in the accident
- Aircraft type: Boeing 707-123B
- Aircraft name: District of Columbia
- Operator: American Airlines
- IATA flight No.: AA1
- ICAO flight No.: AAL1
- Call sign: AMERICAN 1
- Registration: N7506A
- Flight origin: New York International Airport
- Destination: Los Angeles International Airport
- Occupants: 95
- Passengers: 87
- Crew: 8
- Fatalities: 95
- Survivors: 0

American Airlines Flight 1 was a regularly scheduled passenger flight from New York International (Idlewild) Airport (now John F. Kennedy International Airport) in New York City to Los Angeles International Airport in Los Angeles. During takeoff on March 1, 1962, the Boeing 707 rolled over and crashed into Jamaica Bay in New York City two minutes after taking off, killing all 87 passengers and eight crew members aboard. A Civil Aeronautics Board investigation determined that a manufacturing defect in the autopilot system led to an uncommanded rudder control system input, causing the accident. A number of notable people died in the crash. It was the fifth fatal Boeing 707 accident, and at the time, the deadliest. It was the third of three fatal crashes during an operation of American Airlines Flight 1, and the third fatal crash involving one of American's 707s in the New York area within a three-year period after Flight 514 and Flight 1502, all of which yielded no survivors.

== Flight and crash ==
The aircraft was a Boeing 707-123B, registered as N7506A. It was the 12th Boeing 707 manufactured and was delivered to American Airlines on February 12, 1959. At the time of the crash, it had accumulated 8,147 flight hours. Its last periodic inspection had occurred on January 18, 1962, at 7,922 hours. The flight crew consisted of Captain James Heist (56), First Officer Michael Barna Jr. (35), Second Officer Robert Pecor (32), and Flight Engineer Robert Cain (32). Captain Heist was a highly experienced pilot, having accumulated 18,300 flight hours, of which 1,600 were in the 707. First Officer Barna had accumulated 4,800 flight hours, of which 900 were in the 707. Second Officer Pecor had accumulated 3,400 flight hours, of which 1,716 were in the 707. Flight Engineer Cain had accumulated 7,500 flight hours, of which 2,000 were in the 707.

The aircraft received instructions to taxi to Runway 31L at 09:54 EST, and clearance to proceed to Los Angeles nonstop under instrument flight rules (IFR) at 10:02. The aircraft became airborne at 10:07. Following American Airlines procedures and departure control instructions, the aircraft initiated a left turn to a heading of 290°. In the course of the turn, at 1,600 feet (490 m), the aircraft banked too sharply, rolled past 90°, and began an upside-down, nose-first descent in a nearly vertical dive.

The Boeing 707 crashed into Pumpkin Patch Channel, Jamaica Bay, at 10:08:49, while angled at 78° and on a magnetic heading of 300°. Passengers aboard a Mohawk Airlines plane bound for Albany that took off immediately after the Boeing watched the plane plunge into the bay. The jet exploded upon impact, a tall splash of brackish water and black smoke erupted from the site, and the scattered debris and fuel caught fire. Long Island residents described hearing explosions that shook the foundations of nearby houses, although no one on the ground is known to have witnessed the airliner hitting the swamp. However, a few men at Naval Air Station New York/Floyd Bennett Field saw the massive column of water rising above the hangars, and one guard—at his post on the Cross Bay Bridge—saw the aircraft roll over.

The aircraft crashed into a remote area of marshland on Jamaica Bay used as a wildlife sanctuary. Upwards of 300 policemen and fire fighters, including 125 detectives attending a narcotics seminar at the police academy, as well as United States Coast Guard helicopters, were mobilized to the crash site within 30 minutes of the crash for rescue operations, only to find no survivors. The three-alarm fire was under control by 10:50, when only wreckage remained. Low tides aided search personnel in their attempts to recover bodies from the downed aircraft. Only a few bodies remained intact.

== Victims ==
All 95 passengers and crew were killed on impact. Passengers who were killed on board the flight include:

- Admiral Richard Lansing Conolly, USN (retired), president of Long Island University and two-time Deputy Chief of Naval Operations, and his wife Helen
- George T. Felbeck, retired president of Union Carbide and former operations manager of Oak Ridge, Tennessee's uranium enrichment plant, travelling the day after he retired.
- W. Alton Jones, multimillionaire, former president and chairman of Cities Service Company and close personal friend of Dwight D. Eisenhower: Jones was found to be carrying $55,690 in cash, including a rare $10,000 bill.
- Arnold Kirkeby, millionaire realtor and former head of the Kirkeby chain of luxury hotels
- Emelyn Whiton, 1952 Olympic sailing gold medalist (6-m keelboat)

In addition to the loss of life, fifteen of painter Arshile Gorky's paintings and drawings were destroyed in the crash.

== Federal investigation ==
The Civil Aeronautics Board (CAB) received notification of the accident at 10:10 a.m. and immediately sent investigators to Jamaica Bay to conduct an investigation. The flight recorder was found on March 9 and sent to Washington, DC, for analysis. Public hearings were held at the International Hotel in New York on March 20–23, 1962.

Investigators were unable to recover sufficient body tissue to determine whether the crew had been physically incapacitated at the time of the crash. Toxicology reports conclusively ruled out toxic gases, alcohol, and drugs as possible causes for the crash. Milton Helpern, Chief Medical Examiner, decided that having relatives attempt visual identification of the crash victims was inhumane and ordered dental and fingerprint comparisons. In early July, the CAB announced their investigators believed that a cotter pin and a bolt missing from the rudder mechanism might have caused the aircraft to crash. Though considered to be a "mechanic's oversight", the CAB nevertheless wired all operators of 707s to inform them of the potential danger of the assembly.

In January 1963, the CAB released its aircraft accident report stating that the "most likely abnormality" to have caused the crash was a short circuit caused by wires in the automatic piloting system that had been damaged in the manufacturing process. It stated that the probable cause of the accident was "...rudder control system malfunction producing yaw, sideslip, and roll leading to a loss of control from which recovery was not effective" and concluded "that a rudder servo malfunction due to shorted wires is the most likely abnormality to have produced the accident."

CAB inspectors had inspected units at a Bendix Corporation plant in Teterboro, New Jersey, and discovered workers using tweezers to bind up bundles of wires, thereby damaging them. The Bendix Corporation issued denials, stating that the units underwent 61 inspections during manufacturing, in addition to inspections during installation and maintenance work, and insisted that had the insulation on the wires been breached at some point, it would have surely been detected and the unit replaced.

== In popular culture ==
- The crash serves as the central plot element in the 2008 Mad Men episode "Flight 1".
- The accident is mentioned in Chapter 21 of the Dean Koontz novel, From the Corner of His Eye.

== See also ==
- Aviation safety
- American Airlines Flight 1 (1936)
- American Airlines Flight 1 (1941)
