= For Those Who Think Young (Mad Men) =

- Mad Men episode
- Episode no.: Season 2 Episode 1
- Directed by: Tim Hunter
- Written by: Matthew Weiner
- Original air date: July 27, 2008
- Running time: 48 minutes

Guest appearances
- Joel Murray as Freddy Rumsen; Mark Moses as Herman "Duck" Phillips; Gabriel Mann as Arthur; Anne Dudek as Francine Hanson; Alison Brie as Trudy Campbell; Missy Yager as Sarah Beth; Denise Crosby as Gertie; Patrick Cavanaugh as Smitty Smith; Edin Gali as Kurt Smith; Crista Flanagan as Lois Sadler; Seamus Dever as Chuck; Scott MacArthur as Jim; Jennifer Siebel as Juanita; Gerald Downey as Greg Harris; Sarah Drew as Kitty Romano

Episode chronology
← Previous "The Wheel"	Next → "Flight 1"
- Mad Men season 2

"For Those Who Think Young" is the first episode of the second season of the American television drama series Mad Men. It was written by series creator Matthew Weiner and directed by Tim Hunter. The episode originally aired on AMC in the United States on July 27, 2008.

== Plot ==
Set 15 months after the season 1 finale on Valentine's Day 1962, Don learns from his doctor that his blood pressure is high and he must cut back on alcohol and smoking. Peggy returns to work thinner after a three-month sabbatical, Roger comes back to Sterling Cooper, and Betty takes up horseback riding. That day, Don arrives late to a midday meeting: Peggy humiliates his new secretary, Lois, while asking where he is. The team discusses pitching Mohawk Airlines after Duck decides Sterling Cooper should acquire an airline account. Don rejects their ideas and urges them to focus on themes of adventure, escape, and discovery. Meanwhile, Joan struggles to decide where to place a new copy machine.

That night, Don takes Betty to the Savoy Hotel, where they encounter Betty's former roommate Juanita, whom Don suspects is now a call girl. Later, Don is unable to have sex with Betty, and they watch A Tour of the White House with Mrs. John F. Kennedy. Separately, Joan and her boyfriend, as well as a newly married Salvatore Romano also watch the special. Pete consoles Trudy for her dismay at not conceiving and spends the evening alone, eating chocolates bought for her.

Peggy and Salvatore present a sex-focused Mohawk campaign, but Don rejects it and urges them to focus on emotion and individuality, inspired by a Valentine Sally made him. Peggy suggests the tagline, "What did you bring me, Daddy?" Meanwhile, Joan places the new copier in Peggy's office after hearing about her mistreatment of Lois. Meanwhile, Duck urges Roger to hire younger creatives to appeal to younger consumers, worrying Don's team about their jobs. Don eventually hires two young employees. Later, he confronts two men in an elevator for making crude remarks about a woman, and forcefully removes one of their hats.

Betty's car breaks down on her way to pick up Sally from ballet, and she flirts with a mechanic to lower the repair cost of the fan belt so she won't have to tell Don. She then lies to Don about why she was late to pick up Sally. Later, Don quotes a poem from Meditations in an Emergency and mails a copy to an unknown person with the note, "Made me think of you."

== First appearances ==
- Arthur Case: a horserider who has a crush on Betty.
- Sarah Beth Carson: Betty's horseriding friend who has a crush on Arthur.
- Gertie: the owner of the horse stables in which Betty, Sarah Beth and Arthur ride in.
- Kitty Romano: Sal's childhood friend who is now his wife and has suspicions about their marriage and his sexuality.
- Dr. Greg Harris: Joan's boyfriend and a surgeon.
- Smitty Smith: a young copywriter hired by Sterling Cooper.
- Kurt Smith: a young artist hired by Sterling Cooper.

== Reception ==
The episode was received positively by critics at the time. Alan Sepinwall, writing for New Jersey's The Star-Ledger, praised the episode, and the new season of questions it was setting up, saying "Weiner has said that we're going to find out everything in due time; I'm more than willing to wait when the episodes are this strong." Noel Murray, writing for The A.V. Club, was cautiously approving, writing, "If I have one major complaint about this first Season Two episode–aside from my usual complaints that Mad Men can hit its points a little too hard–it's that not much seems to have happened after 15 months. Aside from Betty's transformation into someone less lost and more imperious, the only major hint we get that this is all taking place over a year after the last episode is Don's voice-over quote from an O'Hara poem: 'Now I am quietly waiting for the catastrophe of my personality to become beautiful again.'"
