= Flight 1 (Mad Men) =

- Mad Men episode
- Episode no.: Season 2 Episode 2
- Directed by: Andrew Bernstein
- Written by: Lisa Albert; Matthew Weiner
- Original air date: August 3, 2008
- Running time: 48 minutes

Guest appearances
- Robert Morse as Bert Cooper; Joel Murray as Freddy Rumsen; Mark Moses as Herman "Duck" Phillips; Anne Dudek as Francine Hanson; Myra Turley as Katherine Olson; Audrey Wasilewski as Anita Olson; Crista Flanagan as Lois Sadler; Alison Brie as Trudy Campbell; Kristoffer Polaha as Carlton Hanson; Sarah Drew as Kitty Romano; John Patrick Jordan as Eugene; Rich Hutchman as Bud Campbell; Channing Chase as Dorothy Campbell; Matt Riedy as Henry Wofford; Laura Regan as Jennifer Crane; Vaughn Armstrong as Shel Keneally; Jerry O'Donnell as Gerry Respola; Christopher Carroll as Monsignor Cavanaugh

Episode chronology
← Previous "For Those Who Think Young"	Next → "The Benefactor"
- Mad Men season 2

"Flight 1" is the second episode of the second season of the American television drama series Mad Men. It was written by series creator Matthew Weiner and Lisa Albert, and was directed by Andrew Bernstein. The episode originally aired on AMC in the United States on August 3, 2008.

== Plot ==
Paul hosts a party in Montclair, New Jersey attended by Sterling Cooper employees, who are uncomfortable being around the beatnik, multi-racial guests. Paul introduces Joan to his Black girlfriend, Sheila; Joan makes condescending, racially-charged remarks. Peggy briefly kisses a man she meets, but ultimately goes home alone. The next morning, Don and Roger find employees gathered around news of the 1962 American Airlines Flight 1 crash. Don orders them to restrict publishing their Mohawk Airlines campaign until later, to avoid bad placement.

Pete learns from his brother, Bud, that their father was on the plane. Don tells him to go home, saying "there’s life and there’s work". Later, Bud reveals their father lost the family fortune, which they decide to keep from their mother. That evening, the Drapers host Carlton and Francine. Betty criticizes Bobby for lying about tracing a drawing, while Don defends him. After their guests leave, the couple argue about Carlton's affair (Note: As revealed in "The Wheel") and what it says about happiness and marriage. Elsewhere, Peggy has dinner with her family in Brooklyn, where her mother pressures her to attend Mass and her sister hints at Peggy having psychiatric issues. As she leaves, Peggy hesitantly looks in on her sister's sleeping children. Meanwhile, Roger, Duck, and Cooper eye a potential opportunity with American Airlines due to the crash, but Don opposes dropping Mohawk to pursue it.

Joan and Paul argue over her comments about Sheila, with Joan accusing him of dating Sheila to seem "interesting". Paul retaliates by exposing Joan's age to the office, prompting her to complain to Peggy about blurred personal boundaries. Meanwhile, Duck tries to recruit Pete for the American pitch, but he refuses. Pete is later rebuffed by Don, who is frustrated over potentially dropping Mohawk. Pete then changes his mind and attends the pitch, revealing his father's death to sway American to consider Sterling Cooper. That evening, Don tells Mohawk their account is being dropped, expressing regret: Mohawk doubt his sincerity. Later, Don turns down a waitress's advances. Meanwhile, Peggy stays seated during Communion, and when her sister hands her a baby, it begins to cry.

== First appearances ==
- Jennifer Crane: Harry's wife, a telephone line worker with a blue collar background.
- Sheila: Paul's new black girlfriend.
- Bud Campbell: Pete's older brother, Trudy's brother-in-law and Andrew and Dorothy's son.
- Judy Campbell: Pete and Trudy's sister-in-law, Bud's wife and Andrew and Dorothy's daughter-in-law.
- Gerry Respola: Anita's husband, Katherine's son-in-law and Peggy's brother-in-law.
- Anita Olson Respola: Peggy's older sister, Katherine's other daughter, and Gerry's wife.
- Katherine Olson: Peggy and Anita's mother and Gerry's mother-in-law, who is a strict Catholic.

== Deceased ==
- Andrew Campbell: Pete and Bud's father, Dorothy's husband and Trudy's father-in-law who dies in a plane crash. The character was written off the show because actor Christopher Allport died before filming on the episode began.

== Reception ==
"Flight 1" was watched by 1.3 million viewers.

"Flight 1" was positively reviewed by critics. Eric Goldman of IGN said, "This was a great episode of Mad Men, as some deeply personal issues mixed with the ad game in the worst possible way for the ever-fascinating character of Pete." This episode received a review of "Amazing", and 9/10 stars, with Goldman citing the writers inclusion of historical events to influence its themes and plot.

== Production ==
Series creator Matthew Weiner says "Flight 1" is about how the characters deal with change, saying, "[I's] how you should react to anything and what you were told you should do". Due to Allport's death, Weiner opted against recasting his character. Weiner deliberately made scenes involving Peggy and her sister's children ambiguous.
