= Nanchang J-12 =

Chinese jet fighter prototype

J-12
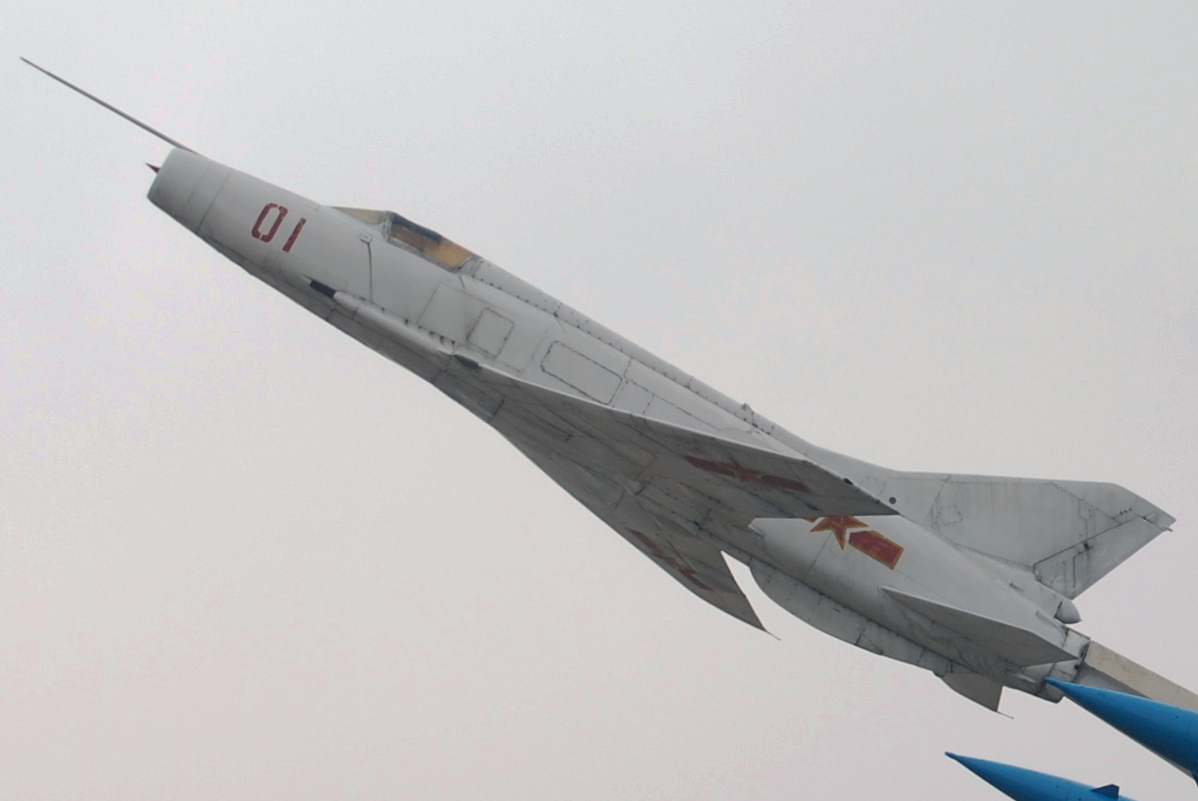
- Nanchang J-12 on display outside of the Chinese Aviation Museum

General information
- Type: Single-seat light fighter / strike fighter
- National origin: People's Republic of China
- Manufacturer: Nanchang Aircraft Factory
- Number built: 5–8 (plus one static test article)

History
- First flight: 26 December 1970

The Nanchang J-12 (Chinese: 歼-12) was a lightweight supersonic fighter built by the People's Republic of China, intended for use by the People's Liberation Army Air Force (PLAAF). Intended to be a modern jet fighter which could take off from short runways and even rural roads, be cheap to service, and be produced quickly in large numbers, it was ultimately determined to be inadequate for modern warfare. Weighing 3,172 kg (6,993 lb) empty, the J-12 is one of the lightest jet fighters ever built. However, neither the J-12 nor the related Shenyang J-13 project entered service.

== Design and development ==
In 1969, the PLAAF issued an order to build a small, inexpensive, STOL (short takeoff and landing) lightweight fighter in order to replace the MiG-19. Two designs were submitted, namely the Shenyang J-11 and the Nanchang J-12. Prototypes of the J-12 were designed by Lu Xiaopeng and built by the Nanchang Aircraft Manufacturing Company (NAMC). The J-12 was a small single-seat jet fighter with low-set, swept wings, swept control surfaces, tubular fuselage, and nose intake with small or absent shock cone. Flight testing of the aircraft began on 26 December 1970. Due to less than satisfactory performance, three additional J-12I prototypes were built with improvements such as simplified control surfaces, a lighter area ruled fuselage, and revised intake.

In 1977 the development of J-12 was abandoned, due to inadequate firepower and engine thrust and also likely due to the introduction of the Chengdu J-7, which offered superior performance and was based on the Soviet MiG-21F. In addition, the concept of aerial guerilla warfare was by this time considered to be untenable.

The J-12 prototypes had accumulated 61 hours in 135 flights by 1977. In 1990s, Lu Xiaopeng proposed upgrading the J-12's fighter design with a reduced Radar cross-section to make the J-12 stealthy, and suggested a modified J-12 fighter to a carrier based fighter for PLA Navy, but none of the proposals were accepted.

== Variants ==
J-12
The initial version of the light fighter with pitot bi-furcated air intake and non-afterburning engine
J-12I
(aka J-12A) Improved J-12 powered by a 8,929 lbf (39.72 kN) Wopen WP-6Z afterburning turbojet

== Specifications (J-12) ==
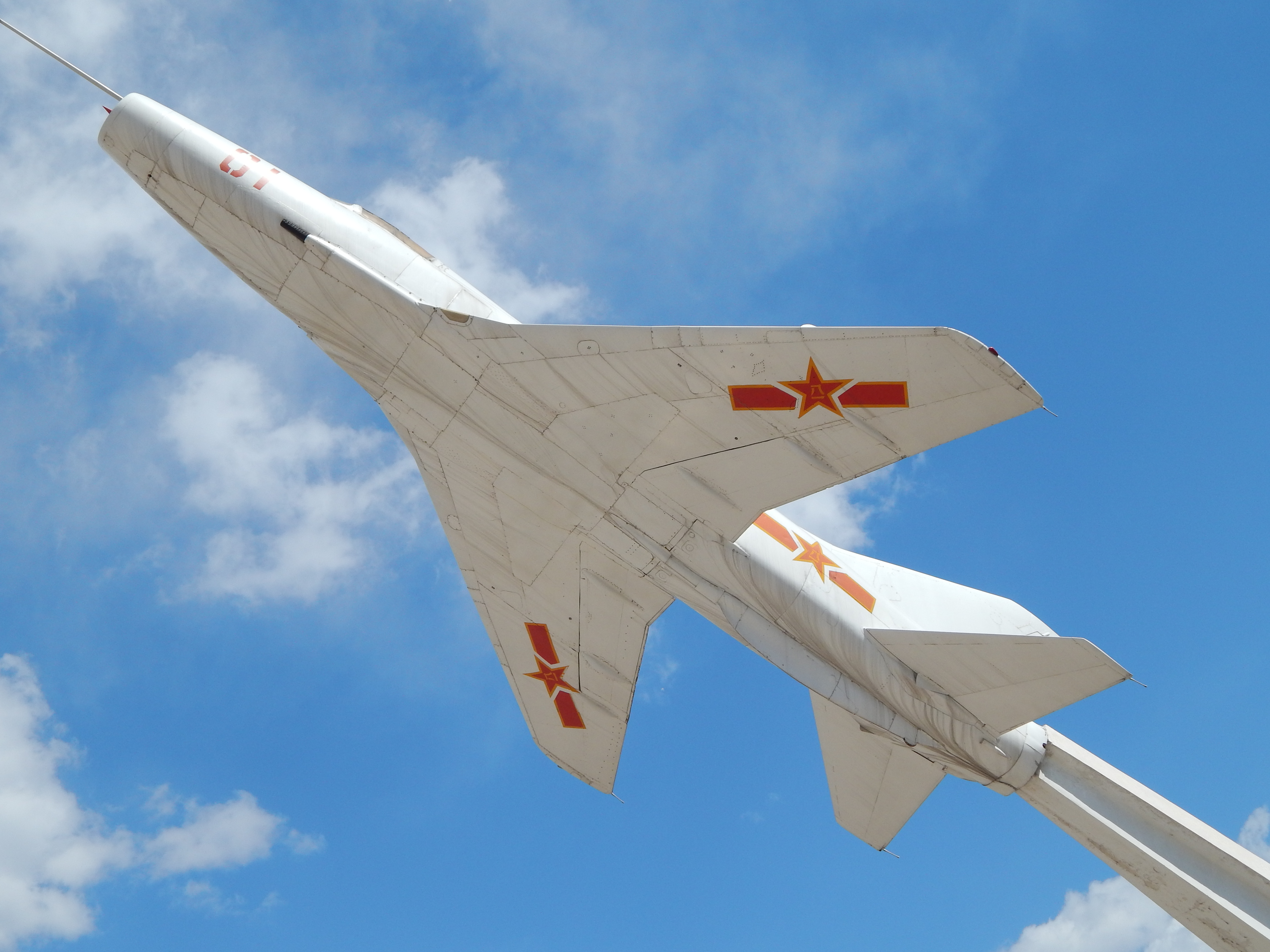
Underside of J-12

Data from Chinese Aircraft:China's aviation industry since 1951

General characteristics

- Crew: 1
- Length: 10.644 m (34 ft 11 in) excluding pitot probe (J-12I - 10.665 m (34.99 ft))
- Wingspan: 7.192 m (23 ft 7 in)
- Height: 3.706 m (12 ft 2 in)
- Wing area: 16.0 m^{2} (172 sq ft)
- Empty weight: 3,172 kg (6,993 lb)
- Max takeoff weight: 5,295 kg (11,673 lb)
- Powerplant: 1 × Wopen WP-6B non-afterburning turbojet, 24.52 kN (5,512 lbf) thrust

Performance

- Maximum speed: 1,472 km/h (915 mph, 795 kn) at 11,000 m (36,000 ft) (J-12I - M1.386)
- Range: 1,167 km (725 mi, 630 nmi) maximum estimated range on internal fuel
- Service ceiling: 16,870 m (55,350 ft) service ceiling. (J-12I - 17,410 m (57,120 ft))
- Rate of climb: 180 m/s (35,000 ft/min) maximum
- Take-off run: 450 m (1,480 ft)

Armament

- Guns: two large calibre cannon in the wing-roots
- Hardpoints: 3 - one under each wing and one on the fuselage centre-line
- Missiles: (J-12I - provision for 2x PL-2 air-air missiles)
