= Harbin/CHDRI Z-6 =

Chinese helicopter

Z-6
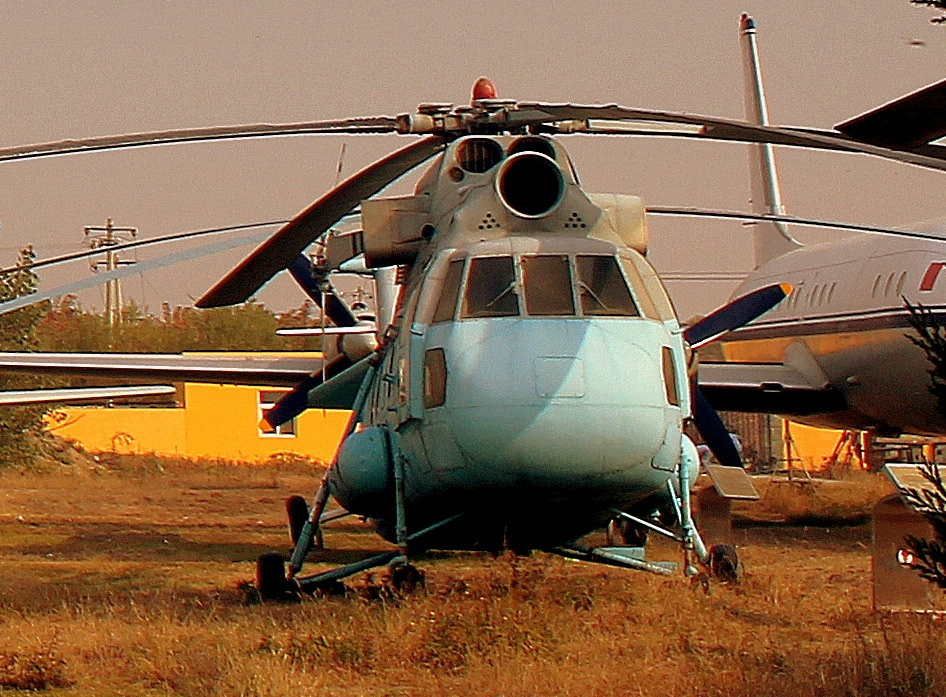
- Harbin Z-6 in Chinese Aviation Museum, Beijing

General information
- Type: Helicopter
- National origin: China
- Manufacturer: Harbin/CHDRI (Zhongguo Zhishengji Sheji Yanjiusuo - Chinese Helicopter Research and development Institute [CHDRI])
- Number built: 11

History
- First flight: 15 December 1969
- Developed from: Harbin Z-5

The Harbin/CHDRI Z-6, (Z - Zhishengji - vertical take-off aircraft), is a Chinese helicopter development based on the Harbin Z-5, itself a licence-built / reverse engineered Mil Mi-4. A limited production run was terminated after performance was found to be inferior to its Z-5 progenitor (sources vary from 6 to 15 completed out of orders for 100).

== Design and development ==
Through the Z-5 project the Chinese obtained valuable knowledge and experience in helicopter design and development. The Z-6 is a turboshaft powered development of the piston engine powered Z-5, the first Chinese designed turboshaft helicopter. The major difference is that the piston engine is replaced by a 1,641 kW (2,200 hp) Dongan WZ-5 turboshaft engine, mounted above the cabin forward of the main gearbox.

Development began in 1966 at the Harbin Aircraft Manufacturing Corporation (HAMC), but two years later development was moved to the newly formed Chinese Helicopter Design Research Institute (CHDRI), with HAMC still responsible for manufacture and assembly of components.

The first prototype (No.6001) was completed in 1967 for use in static testing and official authorisation for the project was given in 1968 and on 15 December 1969 the second Z-6 prototype (No.6002), flew for the first time, piloted by Wang Peimin (王培民). Flight tests proceeded as preparations for production were made in various provinces supplying the assembly line at Hongzhuang Machinery Factory at Changzhou.

Flight tests revealed excessive vibration, insufficient tail rotor thrust, as well as engine and main rotor gearbox overheating. These teething troubles were addressed during the development programme and type approval was given in 1977, despite a fatal crash of a prototype on 7 August 1972 at Princess Ridge (Gongzhuling, 公主岭) in Jilin province, killing all 6 occupants including the pilot, Mr. Fu Guifa (傅贵法). It was discovered that the cause of the accident was due to failure of a transmission component, resulting in engine seizure. Elimination of the seizure problem resulted in 11 design changes as well as those to rectify flight test faults.

Fear of an attack by the USSR, after the Sino-Soviet border conflict, precipitated evacuation of production and development to the Changzhou Airplane Factory and Changhe Aircraft Industries Corporation in 1970. However, the political turmoil in China, namely, Cultural Revolution, took a great toll on the production and only 11 were built before the program was cancelled because the single engine design was deemed unsafe and under-powered.

== Specifications (Z-6) ==
Data from Chinese Aircraft

General characteristics

- Crew: 3
- Capacity: 12 troops or 1,200 kg (2,646 lb)
- Length: 20.962 m (68 ft 9 in) including main and tail rotors
- Height: 5.593 m (18 ft 4 in)
- Max takeoff weight: 7,600 kg (16,755 lb)
- Powerplant: 1 × Dongan WZ-5 turboshaft engine, 1,600 kW (2,200 hp)
- Main rotor diameter: 21 m (68 ft 11 in)

Performance

- Maximum speed: 192 km/h (119 mph, 104 kn)
- Range: 651 km (405 mi, 352 nmi)

== See also ==
Related development

- Harbin Z-5
- Mil Mi-4

Aircraft of comparable role, configuration, and era

- Mil Mi-8

Related lists List of aircraft
