= George T. Felbeck =

American businessman

George Theodore Felbeck
- Born: February 1, 1897; Salina, Kansas, United States
- Died: March 1, 1962 (aged 65); Jamaica Bay, New York City, United States
- Education: B.S.M.E. (1919), M.S.M.E. (1921) – University of Illinois; Ph.D. (1943) – California Institute of Technology
- Occupations: Businessman, chemical and nuclear engineer
- Employer: Union Carbide
- Known for: Vice President of Union Carbide (1944–1962); work on the Manhattan Project
- Spouse: Helen Mildred Kniseley (m. 1919)
- Children: 5

George Theodore Felbeck (February 1, 1897 – March 1, 1962) was an American chemical and nuclear engineer, businessman, and corporate executive. He served as president of Union Carbide from 1944 until his retirement in 1962. During World War II, he was involved in the Manhattan Project at Oak Ridge, Tennessee. Felbeck died in the crash of American Airlines Flight 1, one day after his retirement.

== Biography ==
Felbeck was born in Salina, Kansas, United States to Lewis and Matilda Felbeck. He married Helen Mildred née Kniseley on November 5, 1919.

Felbeck was a graduate of the University of Illinois where he received his B.S.M.E. degree in 1919 and his M.S.M.E. degree in 1921. He left college in 1918 to serve in the infantry of the U.S. Army. While at Illinois he was a member of Sigma Pi fraternity. He received his Ph.D. in physical chemistry from the California Institute of Technology in 1943.

Felbeck became a research assistant for Union Carbide in 1923 and headed its plant in Buffalo, New York. In 1925, he moved to New York City to work as an engineer for the company. He served at Oak Ridge, Tennessee, from 1942 to 1946 as a chemical and nuclear engineer in the Manhattan Project, under the command of Kenneth Nichols. He was appointed vice president of Union Carbide in 1944, and vice president of research in 1957; he worked at the company until his retirement on February 28, 1962.

He and Helen had five children, Dr. George T. Felbeck, Jr., Dr. David K. Felbeck, Richard B. Felbeck, Kristina A. Felbeck (died 1936) and Karen H. Canaday.

Felbeck and his wife were two of 95 passengers who died in the American Airlines Flight 1 crash on March 1, 1962, the day after his retirement.
