= From the Corner of His Eye =

2000 novel by Dean Koontz

- First edition
- Author: Dean Koontz
- Cover artist: Tom Hallman
- Language: English
- Genre: Suspense, thriller, dark fantasy, psychological thriller, novel
- Publisher: Bantam Publishing
- Publication date: 2000
- Publication place: United States
- Media type: Print
- Pages: 729
- ISBN: 0-553-80134-1
- OCLC: 51855431
- LC Class: CPB Box no. 1948 vol. 10

From the Corner of His Eye is a novel by best-selling author Dean Koontz, released in 2000. It is the story of a boy named Barty Lampion, a ruthless killer named Junior Cain, and a girl named Angel, born as the result of a rape.

== Synopsis ==
Dean Koontz writes a tale of good and evil, and how the concepts influence people's lives. The book begins with three separate stories that eventually intertwine: a loving relationship between a mother and her genius son, a ruthless killer, and a young woman who takes it upon herself to raise her late sister's baby.

== Characters ==
=== Bartholomew Lampion ===
Bartholomew Lampion (known as "Barty" to his mother and her friends) was born to Agnes and Joey Lampion, but Joey died in a car accident on the way to the hospital to take Agnes in for labor. Barty was exceptionally smart as a baby. He learned to talk and walk exceptionally early and taught himself to read at the age of two. He also started advanced mathematics a little later. Throughout the book he is known as a "child prodigy." One day, Barty and his mother go to his father's grave when it is raining. Agnes gets soaked in the weather, but not a single drop touched Barty, as he says, "I ran where the rain wasn't."

Barty, when reading at the age of three, starts to complain about wavy lines in the pages of his book. A doctor informs Barty and his mother that he has a rare cancer that would spread to his brain if his eyes were not removed. Barty's eyes are then surgically removed, but later in the book he gets to see again. When he is thirteen, Barty says that he sees where he was not blind. His daughter, Mary, eventually permanently restores his sight.

=== Agnes Lampion ===
Agnes Lampion is Bartholomew's (Barty) mother who is an extremely kind woman who helps others by providing her faith, hope, and occasionally a pie. She cares for her twin brothers who are both traumatized and have slight mental issues. Despite these draw backs she still treats them as normal people and never once shows grief at their presence. Agnes grew up with a father who was very strict and often punished his children very harshly. She was not allowed to take part in any entertainment for it was considered a sin. Her brothers are wary of the house after their father's death, for too many painful memories occurred there, but Agnes tries to wash the horrid suffering away by replacing the terrible reminders with happier ones in their new family. While most people would despise religion after having such strict teaching shoved onto them so brutally, Agnes still strongly believes in God and in his teachings. She often prays for those who are down on their luck, while also providing pies and groceries to people who are in need. Agnes is confused by her son's special talents but does not cast them off as her father would have and embraces them. She carries huge burdens on her shoulders but with her rock like faith she can take on anything. Agnes is one of the characters who represent everything good in the world, while even though she is innocent and a better person than a large chunk of today's population, terrible things still happen to her. Her character shows that while you may have done nothing wrong, bad things happen and it's important to hold faith because when one door closes a new one opens.

=== Enoch Cain Jr ===
Enoch Cain Jr is a delusional psychopath. He pushed his beloved Naomi off the observation platform of a fire tower to her death. It was later revealed that he did this for financial benefit, profiting from the state paying him compensation to avoid a civil lawsuit, as Junior would have triumphed in resulting litigation if he had decided to do so, claiming the bridge was not maintained adequately. He manages to fool all the investigating officers into thinking that it was an accident. Only one detective, Thomas Vanadium, is unpersuaded, and later devotes his life to proving Junior's guilt. He manages to nearly kill Vanadium and believes he did so, but eventually, Vanadium is revealed to have survived and constantly stalks Junior, at first making him believe that he is a ghost back for vengeance.

Junior often promises himself he will never kill again for fear of punishment, and yet he breaks these promises due to his increasing insanity and eventually decides he enjoys killing and becomes a serial killer. Junior's reasoning for this is that he has no belief in an afterlife and decides to do whatever he wants in this world without fear of punishment in the next. He also seems incapable of feeling any remorse mentally, but his body almost always reacts physically to these events, such as stress-induced VD. He normally rationalizes these with absurd explanations that only make sense in his own demented mind. His life and the White family's destinies become intertwined because of an unsettling dream and an act of violence. Early in the book, he believes that Angel is Barty, and attempts to kill her, Celestina, and Wally but, though he wounds Wally badly, is fended off and nearly shot by Celestina. Later, Junior is revealed to be Angel's father, the result of a rape. In the end, his assumption his offspring would bring about his undoing is true as he is ultimately pushed into another world by Angel after trying to kill Barty and being distracted by his nemesis, Detective Vanadium, leaving the killer trapped there. According to Angel, this world is inhabited by the 'big bugs' she was drawing. While his fate is not explained further, it can be assumed he was either killed by the 'big bugs' or died of old age.

=== Thomas Vanadium ===
Thomas Vanadium was a detective and previously a man of the cloth. He had a talent to flick quarters through a hole or gap in dimensions and into another. He was sent into a coma which lasted for eight months after Junior killed a nurse and tried to kill Vanadium. Vanadium suffered numerous facial injuries as a result of this, thus making his face severely distorted. However, he chooses to keep his face in this condition as a way of tormenting Junior, spending much of the book after this making Junior believe he is a ghost back for revenge. Unlike Angel, Barty cannot extend his power to Vanadium so he can walk in the rain without getting wet. Near the end of the story, he helps Angel, Grace, and Celestina move into the Lampions' house. After finding Junior's former lawyer's severed head in a cooler at his and Paul's house, Vanadium arrives just in time to distract Junior enough for Angel to push her evil father into another world. Eventually, after Jacob is killed by Junior, he moves into Jacob's apartment on the Lampion's property (by then Thomas had become good friends with the Lampions, the Whites, and the Isaacsons). A few years before Thomas eventually died from old age, he once again became a man of the cloth.

=== Celestina White ===
Celestina White was the sister of Seraphim White, who took it upon herself to raise her late sister's baby. She is a talented artist and works as a waitress to support herself and later, Angel. Celestina, or Celie to friends, befriends Dr. Walter Lipscomb, the doctor who delivered Angel when the doctor tells her Seraphim flatlined once before Celestina arrived at the hospital and told him 'Rowena loves you, Beezil and Feezil are safe with her'—the names and nicknames of Dr. Lipscomb's late wife and sons who died in a plane crash—names that Seraphim could not have possibly known. While the phenomenon gives Walter hope for peace in an afterlife Celestina is skeptical but comforts him.

When Celestina is evicted from her apartment by her landlord Neddie Nathic Dr. Walter Lipscomb lets her and Angel live in an apartment on some rental property he owns for the same price as thanks for her late sister's gift of his family's message from the afterlife.

Celestina'a art becomes highly sought after and she opens her own show. She enjoys success and life raising Angel with Walter as her close friend. Though they are worlds apart in both education and race (the book set in the mid-1960s where interracial relationships were unheard of) Celestina develops feelings for Walter which he reciprocates but both are too shy to admit them. Eventually during dinner Walter confesses his love and proposes marriage, and she accepts.

Eventually Junior Cain in his madness locates her after stalking her from the art show and attacks, shooting Wally in the chest and trying to break into the house to kill Seraphim's child. Celestina fends him off with a chair long enough for the police to arrive.

=== Angel White ===
Angel White is the daughter of Seraphim White and Seraphim's rapist, Junior Cain. She was adopted by Celestina, her aunt. She and Bartholomew become friends almost immediately. Celestina, Wally, and her grandmother, Grace, later move in next door. She, like Tom and Barty, can see other realities but also has the ability to push people into other worlds, which she only does once and she has no way to bring them back. She finally ends her father's reign of terror by pushing him into another world, which she says was a picture she drew of giant insects.

=== Edom Isaacson ===
Edom Isaacson, as stated above is the identical twin brother of Jacob as well as Agnes's older brother. He often recites terrible natural disasters (floods, hurricanes, earthquakes, etc.) from the past to a mostly unwilling audience. As a child, he received an award for roses, but his father (who considered striving to better one's self a sin) beat him and tried to force him to eat some of the roses. After Agnes marries Joey, Joey takes him to town and buys him all the materials he needs to start his own rose garden. Edom later marries Agnes's English student and good friend Maria Gonzalez, a Mexican woman, and he opens his own florist's shop.
