= The Wheel (Mad Men) =

- Mad Men episode
- Episode no.: Season 1 Episode 13
- Directed by: Matthew Weiner
- Written by: Matthew Weiner; Robin Veith
- Original air date: October 18, 2007
- Running time: 52 minutes

Guest appearances
- Robert Morse as Bert Cooper; Anne Dudek as Francine Hanson; Katherine Boecher as Annie; James Keane as Night Manager; Alison Brie as Trudy Campbell; Joe O'Connor as Tom Vogel; Sheila Shaw as Jeannie Vogel; Andy Umberger as Dr. Arnold Wayne; Mark Moses as Herman "Duck" Phillips; Gregory Wagrowski as Dr. Oliver

Episode chronology
← Previous "Nixon vs. Kennedy"	Next → "For Those Who Think Young"
- Mad Men season 1

"The Wheel" is the thirteenth and final episode of the first season of the American television drama series Mad Men. It was written by Matthew Weiner and Robin Veith and directed by Weiner. The episode originally aired on AMC in the United States on October 18, 2007.

== Plot ==
As Thanksgiving approaches, Pete is feeling pressure from work to attract new business, and from his father-in-law Tom to have a child with Trudy. Betty is upset that Don is staying in the city to work over the holiday weekend rather than visit her family with her and the children. Harry has been kicked out of the house because of his one-night stand with Hildy, and is sleeping at the office.

Francine arrives to Betty's in tears, deducing from long-distance phone charges that her husband, Carlton, is cheating on her. Betty initially comforts her but becomes defensive when Francine says she assumed Betty would know what to do in this situation. Betty secretly pockets their monthly phone bill, and tells Don about Carlton; Don brushes aside her concerns.

Peggy and Ken audition actresses to be the voice-over for the Relax-a-Cizor; Peggy prefers Annie, while Ken argues for Rita. Peggy gives Annie the job, but during the recording, Annie becomes flustered by Peggy's direction, and is fired in favor of Rita. Ken is quietly impressed and stunned by Peggy's assertiveness. Later, Pete informs Don that, through his father-in-law's connections at Vicks Chemical Company, he has brought in a new account: Clearasil.

New Head of Accounts Duck Phillips plans to bring in representatives of Kodak with their new slide projector. While Don brainstorms ideas, he flips through the photos sent to him by Adam, and impulsively calls his hotel. He is informed that Adam died by suicide, leaving him shocked. With Don away, Betty checks the phone bill and calls some of the numbers; one of them is her psychoanalyst, Dr. Wayne, who inadvertently reveals his conversations with Don about Betty's sessions. The next day, Betty speaks to Dr. Wayne about how much therapy has helped her and that she suspects Don has not been faithful.

At the meeting with Kodak, Don pitches the "Carousel", using photos of his own family to evoke the machine's link to nostalgia; his spiel is impactful, moving Harry to tears, and Kodak sign with Sterling Cooper. Don decides to promote Peggy to Junior Copywriter and put her on the Clearasil account. Pete objects and Paul is jealous, but Ken supports the idea. Angered, Pete storms out of the office and gets drunk on his way home, embarrassing Trudy in front of her parents.

Peggy suddenly becomes very sick and goes to the hospital, where she discovers her weight gain has been the result of a cryptic pregnancy. She gives birth to a boy, but refuses to acknowledge him. That night, Don arrives home before Betty and the kids have left and surprises them by saying he will join them, making everyone happy. However, it is revealed Don imagined the scenario, and he sits alone in his empty house.

== Final appearances ==
- Dr. Arnold Wayne: Betty's psychiatrist hired by Don.

== Reception ==
In its original broadcast, the episode received 930,000 viewers.

Andrew Johnston wrote for Slant Magazine that he liked how the series brought Glen back with Betty: "In the scenes with Glen and Betty, we see Betty completely candid, a side of Betty we do not get to see with Don". He goes on to point out that Betty's conversation with Glen "identifies the bigger issue, that Betty no longer has anyone she can be totally honest with since she found out that Don has been talking to her therapist".

Noel Murray writes for The A.V. Club that his favorite scene from the season was Don's pitch of "The Carousel" to Kodak. "Don's pitch focuses around how even though advertising is fairly new, it uses nostalgia to sell products". Murray connects this idea to the premise of the show. He writes that, "It's at once a classic TV drama with a sense of retro style and a sophisticated one in look and tone, on the cutting edge of elliptical television storytelling in the same manner as The Sopranos and The Wire".

== Accolades ==
Matthew Weiner and Robin Veith received a nomination for Outstanding Writing in a Drama Series at the 60th Primetime Emmy Awards.
