= Harbin Z-5 =

Chinese transport/utility helicopter

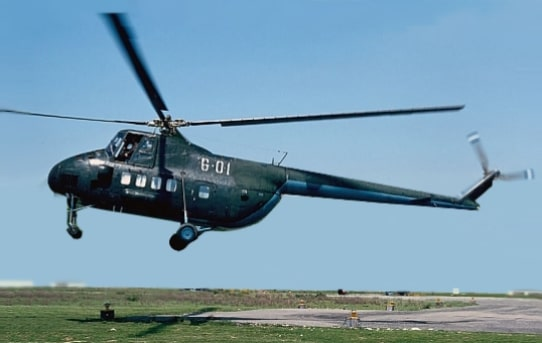
- Harbin Z-5 holding a hover

General information
- Type: Transport helicopter/Utility helicopter
- Manufacturer: Harbin Aircraft Manufacturing Corporation
- Designer: Mil Moscow Helicopter Plant
- Status: In limited service with the Korean People's Air Force
- Primary user: China (historical)
- Number built: 558

History
- First flight: 14 December 1958
- Developed from: Mil Mi-4
- Variant: Harbin/CHDRI Z-6

The Harbin Z-5 (Zhishengji – helicopter) is a Chinese variant of the Soviet Mil Mi-4 piston powered helicopter. Before its discontinuation from service, it was produced in Harbin, China.

== History ==
The Soviets provided China with Mi-4 blueprints just a few years before the Sino-Soviet split in 1958; maiden flight was in 1958 and mass production started in the mid-1960s. China has produced a number of unique variants through this model, and the Z-5 was employed by the PLA, PLAAF and PLANAF in large numbers as reserve forces. A total of 558 Z-5 were built. A few Z-5 helicopters were modified to carry machine-guns and rocket pods.

During the Chinese-Western rapprochement, one Z-5 was refitted with a Pratt & Whitney Canada PT6T-6 "Twin Pac" turbo-shaft engine in 1979. Some sources refer to this as the Z-6, but this variant was discontinued after its first model.

== Variants ==
Generally, Chinese military aircraft have different names for domestic and export models, but this aircraft has consistently been designated "Z-5."

Z-5A
Military transport helicopter. In terms of the original aircraft, it is equivalent to the Mi-4.
Z-5B assault helicopter
Some Z-5 were converted to carry rocket pods on outriggers in addition to a gondola with a forward firing machine gun manned by the flight engineer.In terms of the original aircraft, it is equivalent to the Mi-4A.
Z-5C Xuanfeng
Civil transport helicopter. In terms of the original aircraft, it corresponds to the Mi-4P.
Z-5D helicopter
VIP versions distinguishable by larger rectangular windows in the cabin. In terms of the original aircraft, it is equivalent to the Mi-4S.
Z-5E agricultural helicopter
Some Z-5s were fitted with chemical hoppers and/or spray gear for agricultural or forestry protection use. In terms of the original aircraft, it is equivalent to the Mi-4Skh.
Z-5F helicopter
Thirteen Z-5s are known to have been converted to SAR helicopters with a winch and external fuel tanks. In terms of the original aircraft, it is equivalent to the Mi-4MO.
Harbin/CHDRI Z-6
A turboshaft variant of the Z-5, eleven aircraft built.

== Operators ==
=== Current ===
North Korea

- Korean People's Army Air Force − 48 Mi-4s and Z-5s as of 2024

=== Former ===
Albania

- Albanian Air Force − 37 Z-5s (31 Z-5A, 6 Z-5D) received from China between 1967 and 1971 to replace Soviet-built Mi-4s in service. By 2010, they were replaced with Bell 205, Bell 206, AgustaWestland AW109, and MBB Bo 105 helicopters. All Z-5 have been retired from Albanian Air Force service.

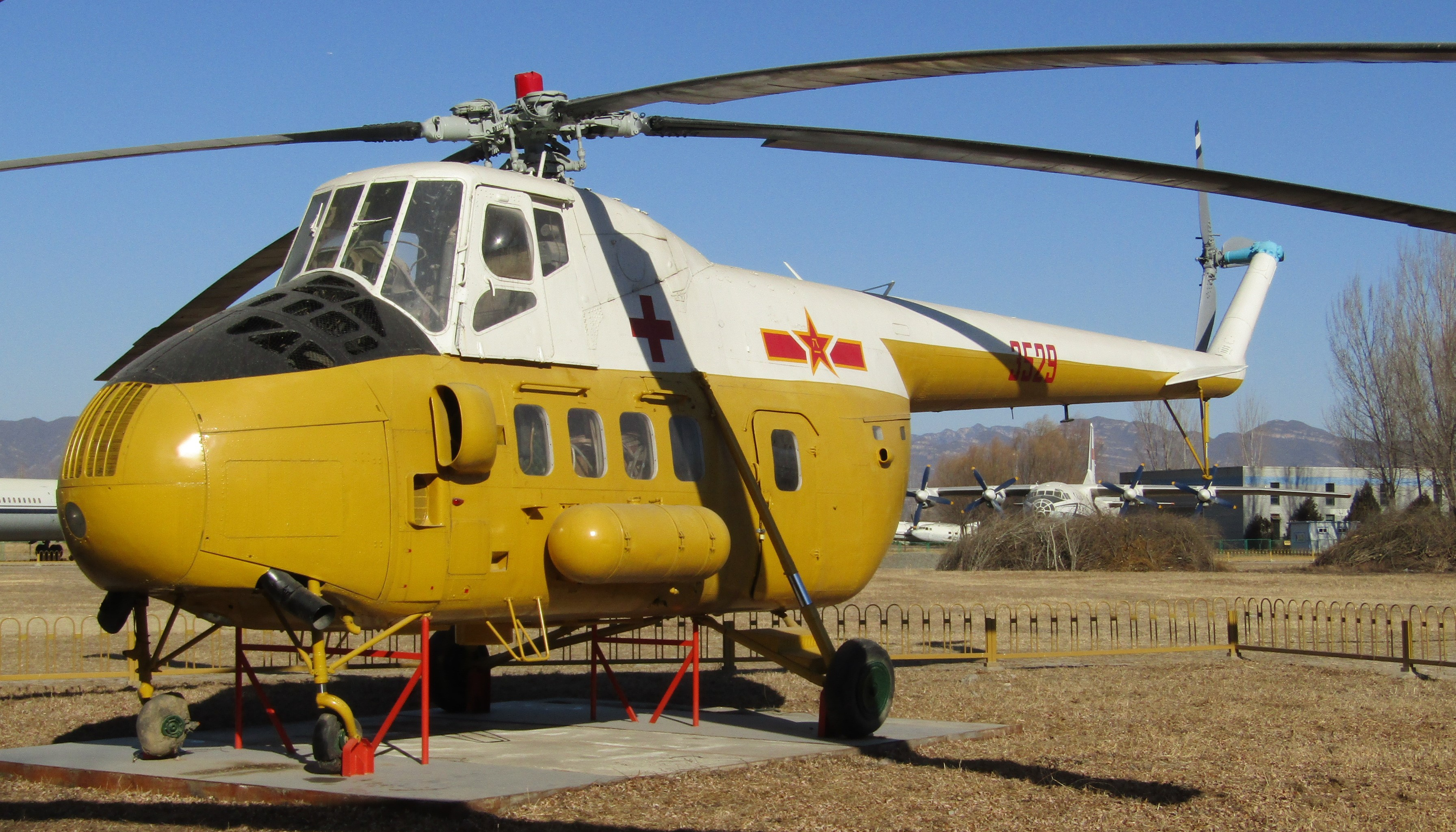
Harbin Z-5 at China Aviation Museum, Beijing

China

- People's Liberation Army Air Force − Operated 350 Z-5s and Z-6s in 2010
- People's Liberation Army Ground Force
- People's Liberation Navy − Operated at least six Z-5s in 2010

Khmer Rouge

- National Army of Democratic Kampuchea − Status unknown after 1990s

== Specifications (Z-5) ==
Data from Chinese Aircraft

General characteristics

- Crew: 3
- Capacity: 1,200 kg (2,646 lb) normal payload, 1,550 kg (3,417 lb) maximum internal payload, 1,300 kg (2,866 lb) maximum slung payload.
- Length: 25.017 m (82 ft 1 in) including main rotor and tail rotor
- Height: 4.4 m (14 ft 5 in)
- Max takeoff weight: 7,600 kg (16,755 lb)
- Powerplant: 1 × Dongan HS-7 14-cylinder, two-row, air-cooled radial piston engine, 1,250 kW (1,680 hp)
- Main rotor diameter: 21 m (68 ft 11 in)

Performance

- Maximum speed: 210 km/h (130 mph, 110 kn)
- Ferry range: 780 km (480 mi, 420 nmi) with external fuel tanks

== See also ==
Related development

- Mil Mi-4
- Harbin/CHDRI Z-6

Aircraft of comparable role, configuration, and era

- Sikorsky H-19 Chickasaw
- Sikorsky H-34
- Westland Wessex

Related lists

- List of aircraft

== Bibliography ==
- Bill Gunston, An Illustrated Guide to Military Helicopters, Salamander Books Ltd, London 1981. ISBN 978-0861011100
- International Institute for Strategic Studies (13 February 2024). "Chapter Five: Asia". The Military Balance. 124 (1): 218–327. doi:10.1080/04597222.2024.2298593. ISSN 0459-7222.
- Wragg, David (2011). The World Air Power Guide. Casemate Publishers. ISBN 978-1-84468-784-8.
