= Takhtamygda =

Takhtamygda Тахтамыгда
- Selo
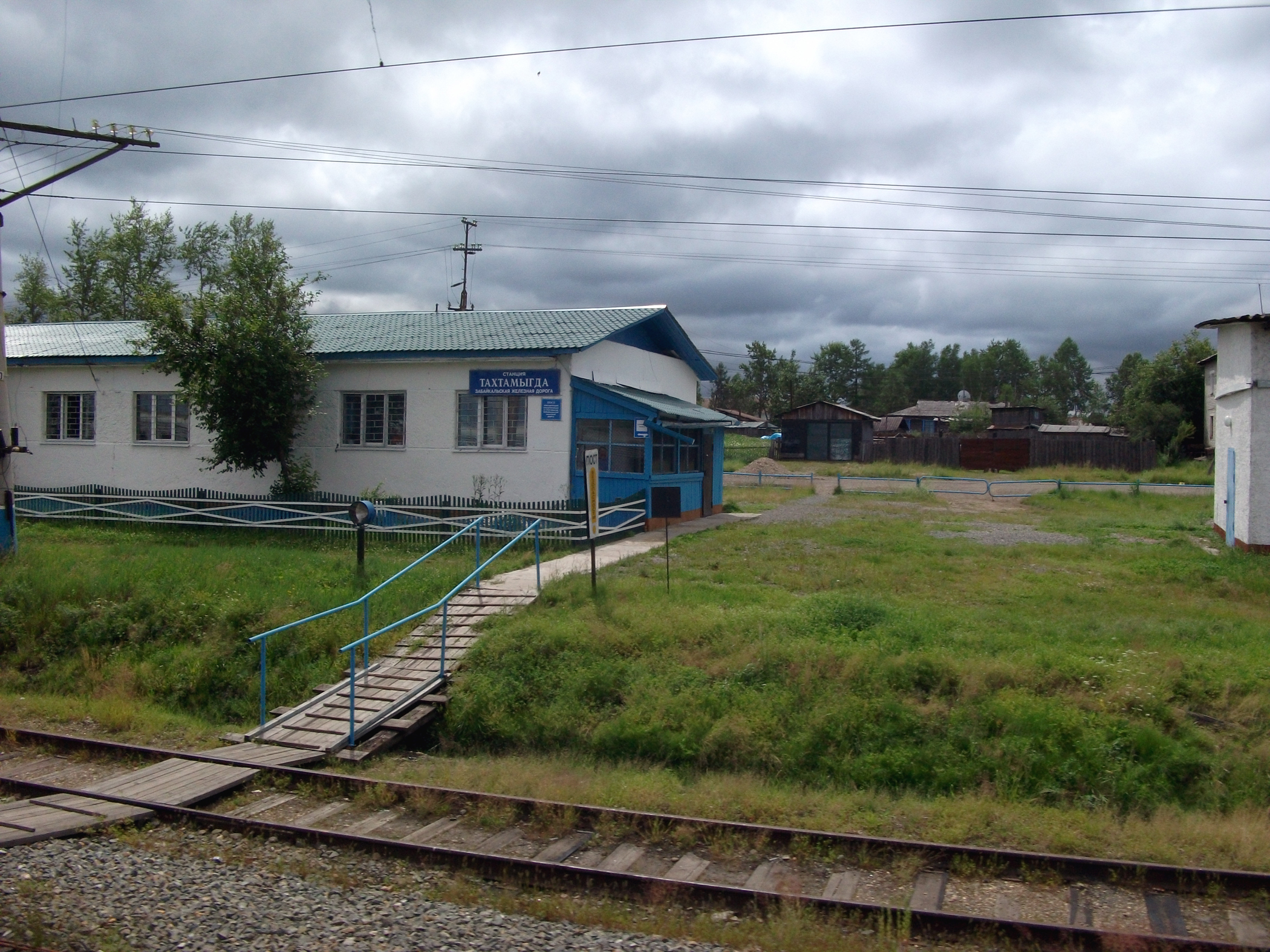
- Takhtamygda railway station

- Location within Amur Oblast Location within Russia
- Coordinates: 54°06′N 123°36′E
- Country: Russia
- Region: Amur Oblast
- District: Skovorodinsky District
- Time zone: UTC+9:00

Takhtamygda (Russian: Тахтамыгда) is a rural locality (a selo) and the administrative center of Takhtamygdinsky Selsoviet of Skovorodinsky District, Amur Oblast, Russia. The population was 1,498 as of 2018. There are 18 streets.

== Geography ==
Takhtamygda is located on the Maly Oldoy River, 40 km northwest of Skovorodino (the district's administrative centre) by road. BAM is the nearest rural locality.
