= Aeroflot Flight 101/435 =

1985 Soviet aircraft hijacking

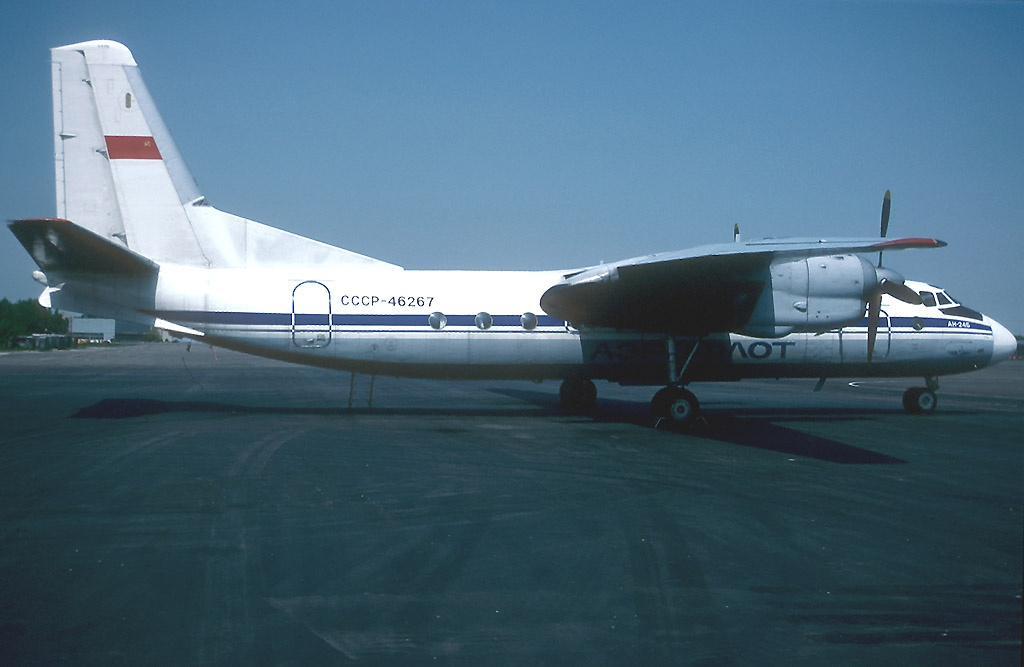
- A Soviet Antonov An-24 similar to that involved in the incident

Hijacking
- Date: 19 December 1985
- Summary: Hijacking

Aircraft
- Aircraft type: Antonov An-24
- Operator: Yakutsk United Air Group division of Aeroflot
- Registration: CCCP-42845
- Flight origin: Yakutsk
- Stopover: Takhtamygda
- 2nd stopover: Chita
- Destination: Irkutsk
- Passengers: 46
- Crew: 5
- Fatalities: 0
- Survivors: 51

Aeroflot Flight 101/435 was a Soviet domestic passenger flight that was hijacked by its co-pilot, Shamil Alimuradov, on 19 December 1985, en route from Takhtamygda to Chita. Armed with a hatchet, Alimuradov demanded that captain Vyacheslav Abramyan divert the Antonov An-24 aircraft to China. Soviet officials authorized the crew to land in China, and gave Abramyan the radio frequency of Qiqihar Airport, but Alimuradov demanded that Abramayan fly to Hailar instead. The aircraft ran out of fuel, and landed in a cow pasture. Alimuradov was apprehended by the Chinese, and the passengers were allowed to travel to Hailar and Harbin. On 21 December, the crew and all 46 passengers returned safely to the Soviet Union.

== Hijacking ==
According to the TASS news agency, the aircraft "had to alter its course as a result of forcible actions of an armed criminal on board and landed in the northeastern part of the People's Republic of China". In 1970, following the hijacking of Aeroflot Flight 244, aircraft captains in the Soviet Union were allowed to possess arms on board; but Abramyan, despite being armed, decided not to resist as it required unbuckling his seat's safety harness. However, he managed to contact air traffic control through a concealed button and report the hijacking.

When the aircraft landed in China, it ran out of food and the temperature outside the aircraft was −25 °C (−13 °F). The Chinese did not allow the crew to warm the cabin because it required starting the engines. Later the passengers were given food and accommodation in a Hailar hotel. The Soviet embassy in Beijing was notified of the incident.

The next day, the passengers were given questionnaires with only name and purpose of visit to be filled out. The passengers were advised to write "tourist trip" as the purpose of the visit. Then they visited Qiqihar, ate in a local restaurant and received Chinese vacuum flasks as gifts.

== Aftermath ==
The passengers returned from Harbin to Chita on a Tupolev Tu-134. Shamil Alimuradov was found guilty in China after a one-day trial in the Harbin Intermediate People's Court, where he was represented by a Chinese lawyer, and sentenced in March 1986 to eight years in prison. After three years he was returned to the Soviet Union, where he was sentenced to five more years under Soviet laws. The hijacked aircraft was flown back to the Soviet Union in January 1986.
