= Aeroflot Flight 101/X-20 =

1965 aviation accident

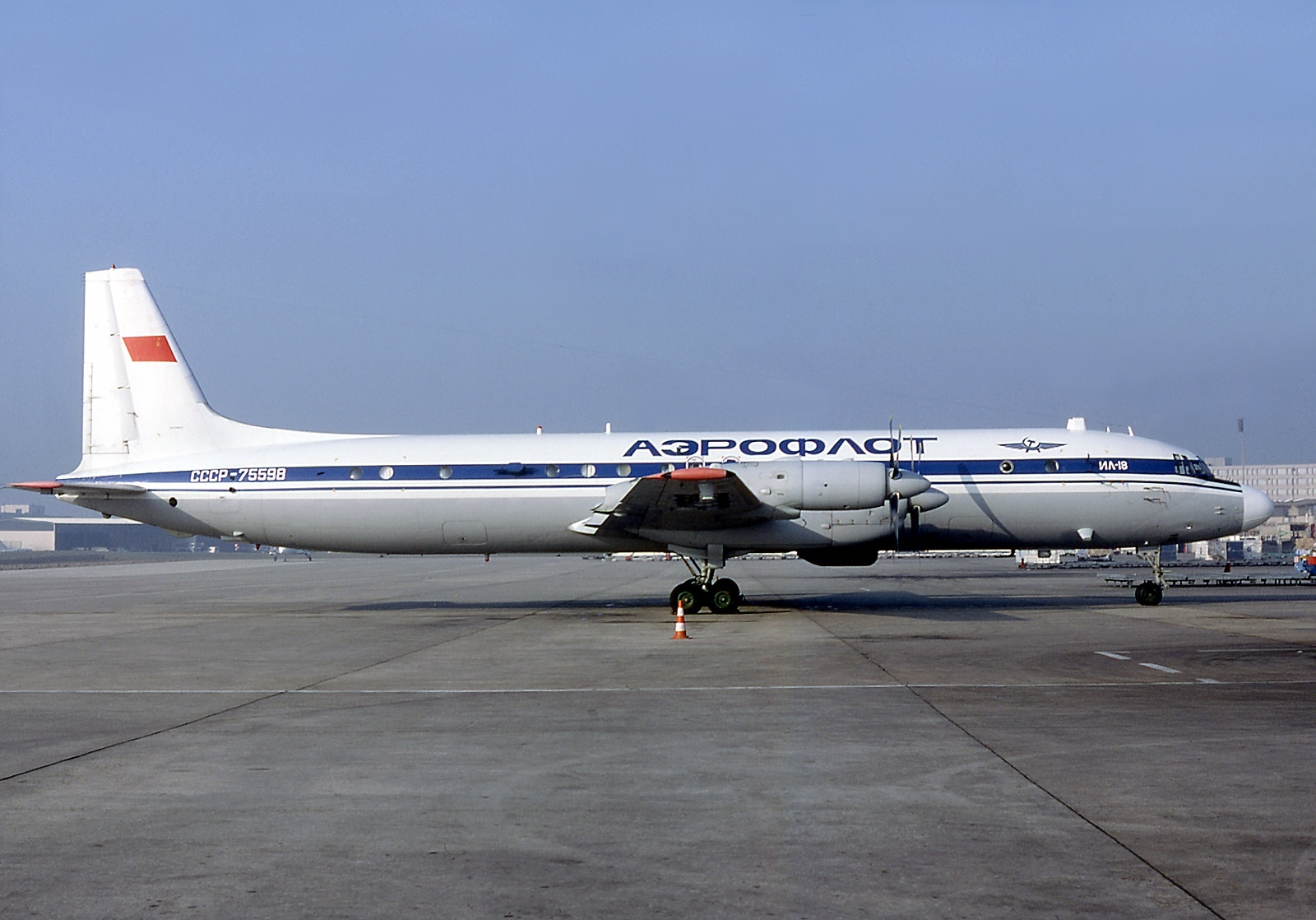
- An Ilyushin Il-18 of Aeroflot, similar to the one involved

Accident
- Date: 4 January 1965
- Summary: Controlled flight into terrain
- Site: Near Alma-Ata Airport; 43°21′59.85″N 77°3′18.19″E

Aircraft
- Aircraft type: Ilyushin Il-18B
- Operator: Aeroflot
- Registration: СССР-75685
- Flight origin: Domodedovo Airport, Moscow, Russian SFSR
- Stopover: Omsk Tsentralny Airport, Omsk Oblast, Russian SFSR
- Destination: Alma-Ata Airport, Alma-Ata, Kazakh SSR
- Occupants: 103
- Passengers: 95
- Crew: 8
- Fatalities: 64
- Injuries: 17
- Survivors: 39

Aeroflot Flight 101/X-20 (Russian: Рейс 101/X-20 Аэрофлота Reys 101/X-20 Aeroflota) was a scheduled domestic passenger flight from Moscow to Alma-Ata via Omsk, Soviet Union, that crashed in low visibility conditions on 4 January 1965, killing 64 of the 103 people on board.

== Aircraft ==
The aircraft involved in the accident was an Ilyushin Il-18B registered CCCP-75685 to the Kazakh Civil Aviation Directorate of Aeroflot. The aircraft had sustained 6802 flight hours.

== Crew ==
Eight crew members were aboard the flight. The cockpit crew consisted of:

- Captain Konstantin Sergeevich Artamonov
- Check captain and Head of the Kazakh Civil Aviation Directorate Rishat Nurmukhametovich Azakov
- Co-pilot Nikolai Aleksandrovich Slamikhin
- Flight engineer Anatoliy Galiyevich Shakirov
- Navigator Vladimir Vasiliyevich Pristavka
- Radio operator Nikolay Nikolayevich Safonov

Stanislav Port and Avgusta Kuzmenykh served as flight attendants.

== Synopsis ==
The flight was scheduled to depart from Domodedovo airport at 07:30 on 4 January, but was delayed by necessary engine repairs. The flight did not depart from Domodedovo until 10:20 and arrived at Omsk airport at 15:52 Moscow time. The flight was supposed to depart from Omsk thereafter for a short flight to Alma-Ata. At the same time, head of the Kazakh aviation division R. Azakov had just returned from investigating a Mil Mi-4 crash and inspected the undercarriage of the Il-18 before it was cleared for the next leg of the journey. The flight's destination was delayed for 2 hours 28 minutes because visibility at Alma-Ata airport was less than 1,000 metres (3,300 ft), which meant that the airport had to close for safety reasons. At 19:30 Moscow time the flight departed from Omsk en route to Alma-Ata and maintained a cruising altitude of 7,000 metres (23,000 ft).

At 20:15 Moscow time the weather at Alma-Ata was reported to have a visibility of 3,000 metres (9,800 ft), wind was weak, and atmospheric pressure was 710.5 mmHg. At 20:32, a different Il-18, registered CCCP-75689, landed on runway 23 bearing after twice failing to land on the reciprocal (RWY 05) and having to execute a go-around. While taxiing to the apron, the operations manager asked the Il-18 if it would be safe for another Il-18 to land in the same weather. The pilot responded by categorically denying that any Il-18 could safely land in the current conditions. The controller then told Flight 20 to proceed to its alternate, Sary-Arka Airport; but five minutes later the operations manager reversed the previous instruction and told Flight 20 to begin a descent to 4,500 metres (14,800 ft) and then to 3,000 metres (9,800 ft) for landing at Alma-Ata. In violation of procedure, the controller did not inform the flight of the visibility or cloud-base prevailing at the airport.

At an altitude of 3000 meters the flight contacted air traffic control and received permission to descend to an altitude of 700 metres (2,300 ft). The landing was to be carried out on runway 23. The controller did warn of the presence of fog at the airport, but said that it had subsided a bit and he did not expect visibility to go below the minimum safe level. The crew began to execute the approach as planned, but after turning onto final approach the aircraft was 500 metres (1,600 ft) to the right of the centerline of the runway. When the aircraft was 10 kilometres (6.2 mi) away from the runway threshold, the controller instructed the crew to decrease altitude to 300 metres (980 ft) and warned that visibility was starting to worsen. When the aircraft was 8.5 kilometres (5.3 mi) from the end of the runway it established itself on the glidepath and continued its descent for the landing.

The visibility at the airfield had reached 800 metres (2,600 ft), well below the published minimum; the controller did not inform the flight or the operations manager of the situation. As a result, the aircraft continued its approach instead of diverting to its alternate, as conditions required it to do. The non-directional beacon lights pulsed, but the aircraft began to deviate to the left slightly. The controller notified the crew of the deviation and instructed them to correct course by 2° and follow the lights to approach the runway. The crew acknowledged the controller's transmission and stated that they saw the beacon lights. The controller then instructed the flight to change course by 3°, with the result that the aircraft went from being slightly to the left of the extended centreline to slightly to the right. The controller advised the crew to execute a missed approach, but the crew ignored the instruction and continued with the landing.

During the approach, check captain Azakov instructed the pilot-in-command, Artamonov, to conduct an instrument approach, while Azakov carried out other landing duties. There was confusion among the crew at decision altitude (130 metres; 430 ft) because the controller told them to go-around due to limited visibility but both the navigator and inspector told the captain they could see the runway lights, leading him to continue the approach. Shortly thereafter the crew lost sight of the lights, but the captain was not aware of the fact; the captain then drew his attention away from his instruments to look for the lights, causing the aircraft to fly off course. When the controller commanded the flight to go around, the inspector was looking for the lights while the pilot-in-command waited for him to instruct him to proceed with the go-around. Seconds before crashing the captain saw that the plane was about to crash and tried to avoid the collision with the ground, and only then did Azakov command him to do a go-around.

At 21:01 Moscow time the flight crashed 210 metres (690 ft) to the right of the runway at a speed of 300 kilometres per hour (190 mph). The landing gear was torn off and the right wing separated from the rest of the plane. The left wing and fuselage were broken into several pieces, and a fire ignited, partially burning the wreckage. The radio operator, both flight attendants and 61 passengers were killed in the accident. Seventeen of the survivors sustained injuries.

== Conclusions ==
The causes of the accident were described as follows:

1. The air traffic controller dispatching the flight for landing in weather below minimum safe conditions and not immediately informing the crew of such conditions;
2. Crew error in executing the late missed approach and flying in unsafe weather.

A secondary cause of the accident was the failure of METAR to provide weather reports at 20:00, 20:15 and 20:30 when the bad weather intensified, which would have helped assist the flight to determine if it should have continued with the approach.

It was also noted that the head of the Kazakh Civil Aviation Directorate was not supposed to assist the crew on the flight, as he had already worked fifteen hours that day and did not have a medical certificate to fly.
