= Mil Mi-4 =

Soviet transport helicopter

Mi-4
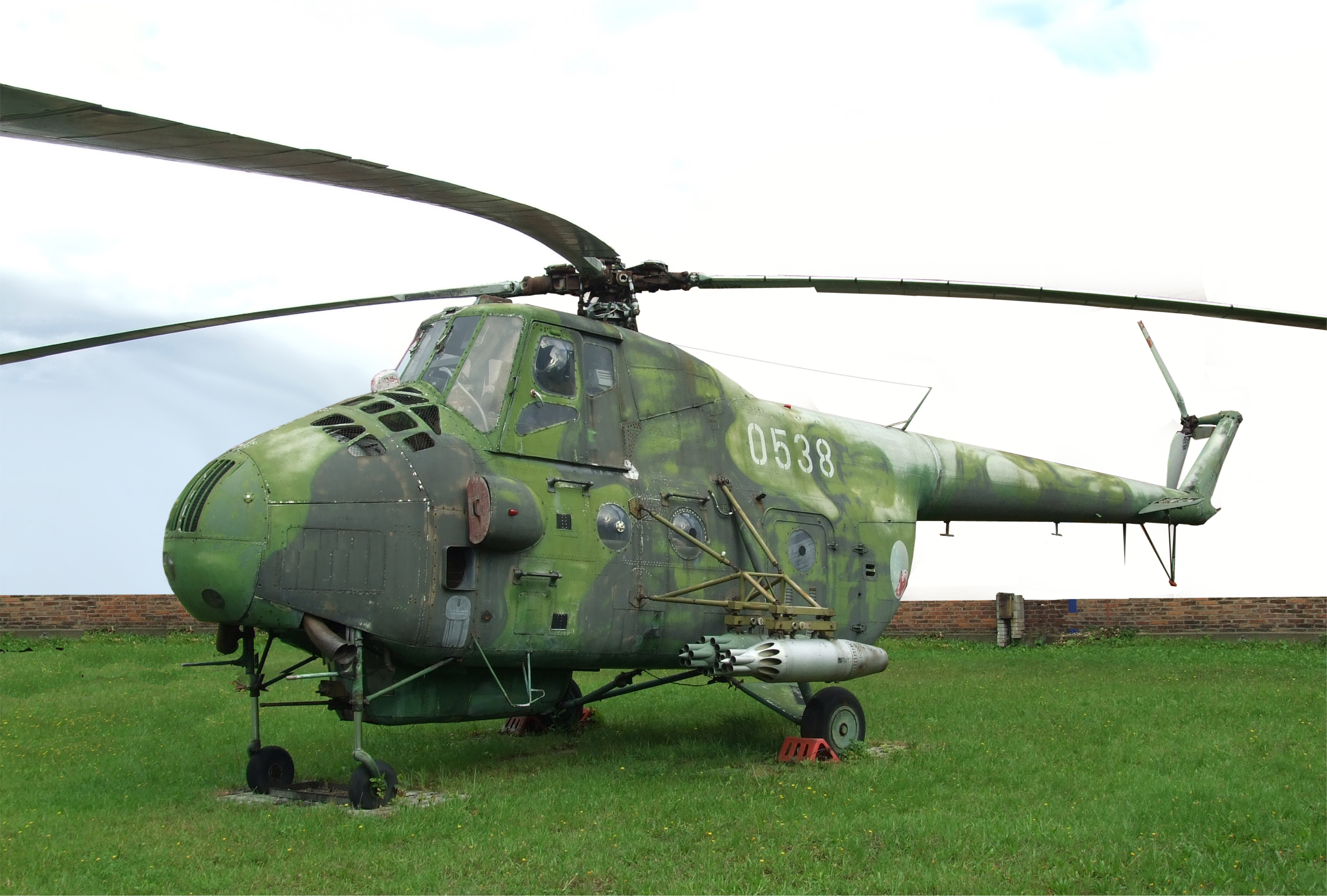
- Mil Mi-4AV at Prague Aviation Museum

General information
- Type: Transport helicopter
- Manufacturer: Mil Moscow Helicopter Plant
- Status: Limited Service; North Korean Air Force
- Primary users: Soviet Air Force Indian Air Force; Polish Air Force; Royal Afghan Air Force
- Number built: over 4,000 including Z-5s

History
- Manufactured: 1951–1979
- Introduction date: 1953
- First flight: 3 June 1952
- Variant: Harbin Z-5

The Mil Mi-4 (USAF/DoD reporting name "Type 36", NATO reporting name "Hound") is a Soviet transport helicopter that served in both military and civilian roles.

== Design and development ==
The Mi-4 was designed in response to the American H-19 Chickasaw and the deployment of U.S. helicopters during the Korean War. While the Mi-4 strongly resembles the H-19 Chickasaw in general layout, including the innovative engine position in front of the cockpit, it is a larger helicopter, able to lift more weight and built in larger numbers. The first model entered service in 1953. The helicopter was first displayed to the outside world in 1952 at the Soviet Aviation Day in Tushino Airfield.

== Operational history ==
The Mi-4 transport helicopter laid the groundwork of Soviet Army Aviation. It was widely used both in the armed forces and in Soviet civil aviation, and for several decades remained the main type of helicopter in the inventory of the Soviet Armed Forces and of the Civil Air Fleet. The Mi-4 went out of service with the development of the Mi-8. It is no longer used by the Russian Air Force, though it remained in service in some countries as a utility helicopter or as a military transport a while longer. Albania was thought to be the final country using the helicopter, and by 2005 all were out of service. The Mi-4 played a very important role in the Bangladesh liberation war of 1971. The Mi-4 was the workhorse of the Indian Air Force covering the medium lift role at the time. A highly successful heli-borne operation, the Meghna Heli Bridge, using Mi-4s helped the Indian Army's 57 Mountain Division clear the Meghna River. The helilift of a battalion of Indian troops to the outskirts of Sylhet was the first heli-borne operation of the Indian army.

Much like the UH-1 Huey, after it was gradually phased out of military service, it was used in various domestic roles: search and rescue, firefighting, polar expeditioning, construction site cargo helicopter, commercial flights and many others.

An official video of a North Korean Air Force combat flying skills competition released in 2014 shows that the Mi-4 is still in limited service in North Korea.

== Variants ==
V-12
Prototype. Designation reused for the Mi-12.
Mi-4 (NATO – Hound-A)
Basic production version.
Mi-4A
Assault transport helicopter.
Mi-4AV
Armed versions based on the Mi-4A. V for Vooruzhenniy (Armed). Mi-4A with additional armament. Modification of 1967 had weapons complex K-4V, included four 9М17М ATGM "Phalanga" and 96 57-mm NAR S-5M in six blocks UB-16-57U (or six 100-kg bombs or four 250-kg bombs or tanks with an incendiary substance); 185 helicopters were converted to Mi-4AV.
Mi-4GF
Factory designation for demilitarised Mi-4 for use in the Civil Air Fleet.
Mi-4L Lyukes
Six-seat VIP transport version, sometimes converted into an air ambulance helicopter.
Mi-4VL
Fire-fighting version of Mi-4L.
Mi-4M (NATO – Hound-C)
Anti-submarine warfare helicopter with searching radar station SPRS-1 ("Kurs-M"), hydroacoustic station "Baku", additional fuel tank and rescue boat with operator in under-fuselage gun turret.
Mi-4ME
Export modification of Mi-4M.
Mi-4VM
Slightly modified version of Mi-4M, differed by some avionics system.
Mi-4MR
Upgraded version of Mi-4VM with the searching radar station "Rubin-V" instead of "Kurs-M".
Mi-4P / Mi-4VP
Civil transport helicopter, with accommodation for between 8 and 11 passengers, plus eight stretchers and a medical attendant for air ambulance duties. It has square windows compared to the circular windows of the military versions.
Mi-4PL (NATO – Hound-B)
Anti-submarine warfare helicopter.
Mi-4PS
SAR version.
Mi-4S Salon
VIP transport helicopter.
Mi-4Skh
Multi-role agricultural helicopter, with a large chemical container in the main cabin. Also used as a fire-fighting helicopter.
Mi-4T
Major military production version, equipped with a large diameter main rotor and bulged windows.
Mi-4VM (VM-12)
Anti-submarine warfare helicopter.
Mi-4BT
Minesweeper with floats.
Mi-4RI
Mi-4M equipped with the Rion experimental sonar.
Mi-4MT
Torpedo-carrying ASW attack (killer) aircraft derived from Mi-4M.
Mi-4MU
Attack helicopter.
Mi-4MO
Search helicopter with Oka sonar.
Mi-4MS
Search helicopter with Soora infra-red sensor.
Mi-4FV (Mi-4KV)
Photographic and guidance helicopter.
Mi-4Schch
"Polar version" of Mi-4FV for working at the Soviet Arctic and Antarctic research stations.
Mi-4SP
Special rescue modification.
Mi-4PG
Experimental version equipped with an external load sling system.
Mi-4SV
Mi-4 with improved heat insulation for working in the Far North.
Mi-4N "Filin" (Horned owl)
Experimental reconnaissance version intended for night-time use.
Mi-4KK (Mi-4VKP)
Mobile command post.
Mi-4KU (Mi-4VPU)
Mobile command post for controlling Air Force units.
Mi-4U
Target-designator version carrying the Oospekh (Success) system.
Mi-4GR
Mi-4 fitted with Grebeshok-3 (Haircomb-3) wide-range panoramic detection and relay radar.
Mi-4TARK
TV-equipped artillery reconnaissance and spotting helicopter.
Mi-4MK (Mi-4PP)
ECM version.
Mi-4UM
Radio-controlled target drone version.
Harbin Z-5
Chinese military transport helicopter. Chinese production version.
Harbin Z-6
Prototype turbine powered version of the Z-5, no production undertaken.
Xuanfeng
Chinese civil transport helicopter. Chinese production version.

Unnamed Variants

- Mi-4 minelayer version produced by converting troop-carrier helicopters.
- Mi-4 modified for transporting and laying gas pipelines.
- Mi-4 with Panorama 360 cin camera system produced by conversion.
- Mi-4 with the Pristavka (Add-on) radio equipment developed in 1957 for guidance of remote-controlled reconnaissance balloons.
- Mi-4s used as testbeds. Apart from the above-mentioned versions, the Mi-4 and Mi-4A were widely used as testbeds of various kinds for testing subassemblies and systems of future aircraft, as well as equipment for other branches of industry.

== Operators ==
Afghanistan

- Afghan Air Force

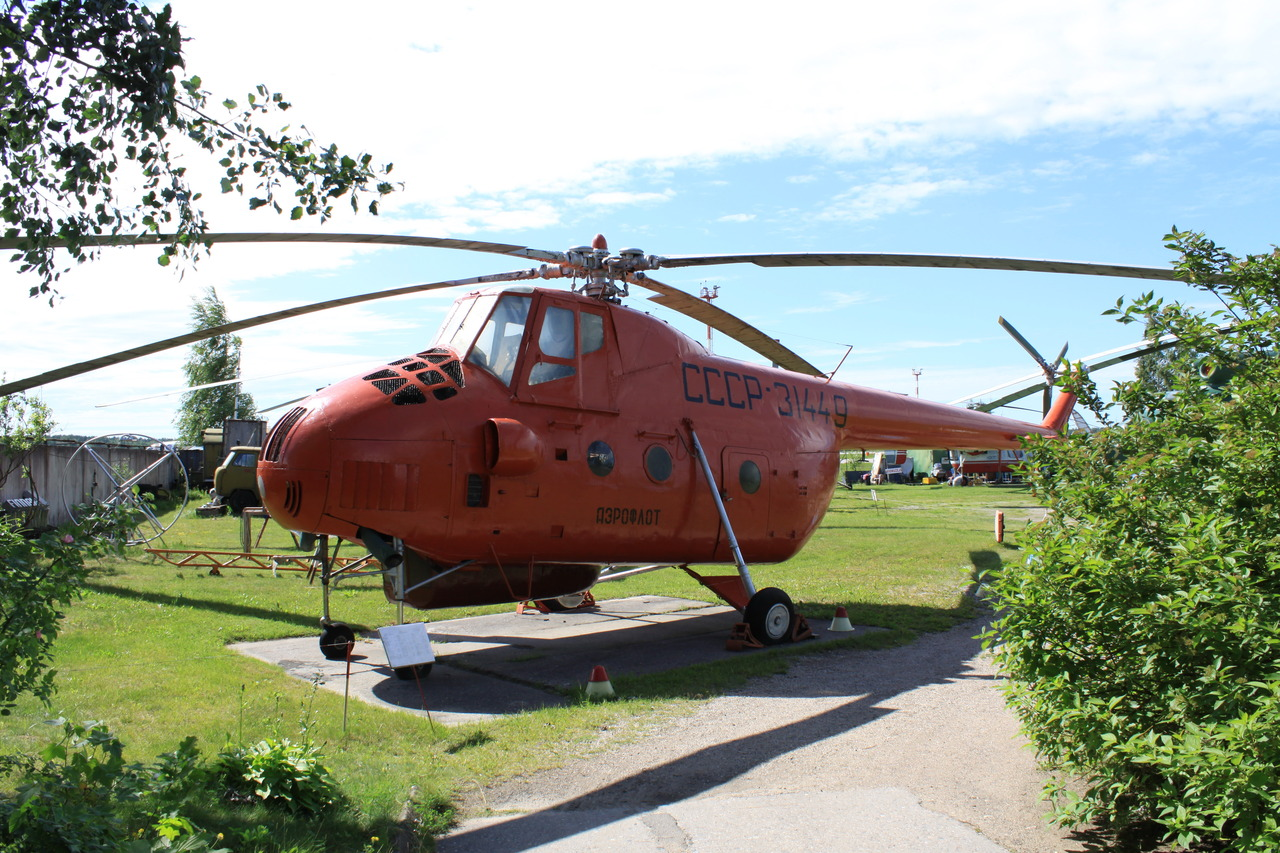
MI-4 in Riga aviation museum

Albania

- Albanian Air Force - Seven Mi-4As were acquired from the Soviet Union between 1957 and 1958. One was lost in an accident. After diplomatic relations with the Soviet Union were severed, the Albanians received the Z-5, an identical model. As of 2026, all Mi-4 and Z-5 have been retired from Albanian Air Force service.

Algeria

- Algerian Air Force

Bangladesh

- Bangladesh Air Force

People's Republic of Bulgaria

- Bulgarian Air Force
- Bulgarian Navy

Cambodia

- Cambodian Air Force

China

- People's Liberation Army Air Force

Cuba

In 1961 and 1974, 85 Mi-4 Hound A were imported

- Revolutionary Armed Forces

Czechoslovakia

- Czechoslovak Air Force

Mil Mi-4 of the Finnish Air Force

East Germany

- East German Air Force
- East German Navy
- Lufthansa
- Interflug

Egypt

- Egyptian Air Force

Finland

- Finnish Air Force

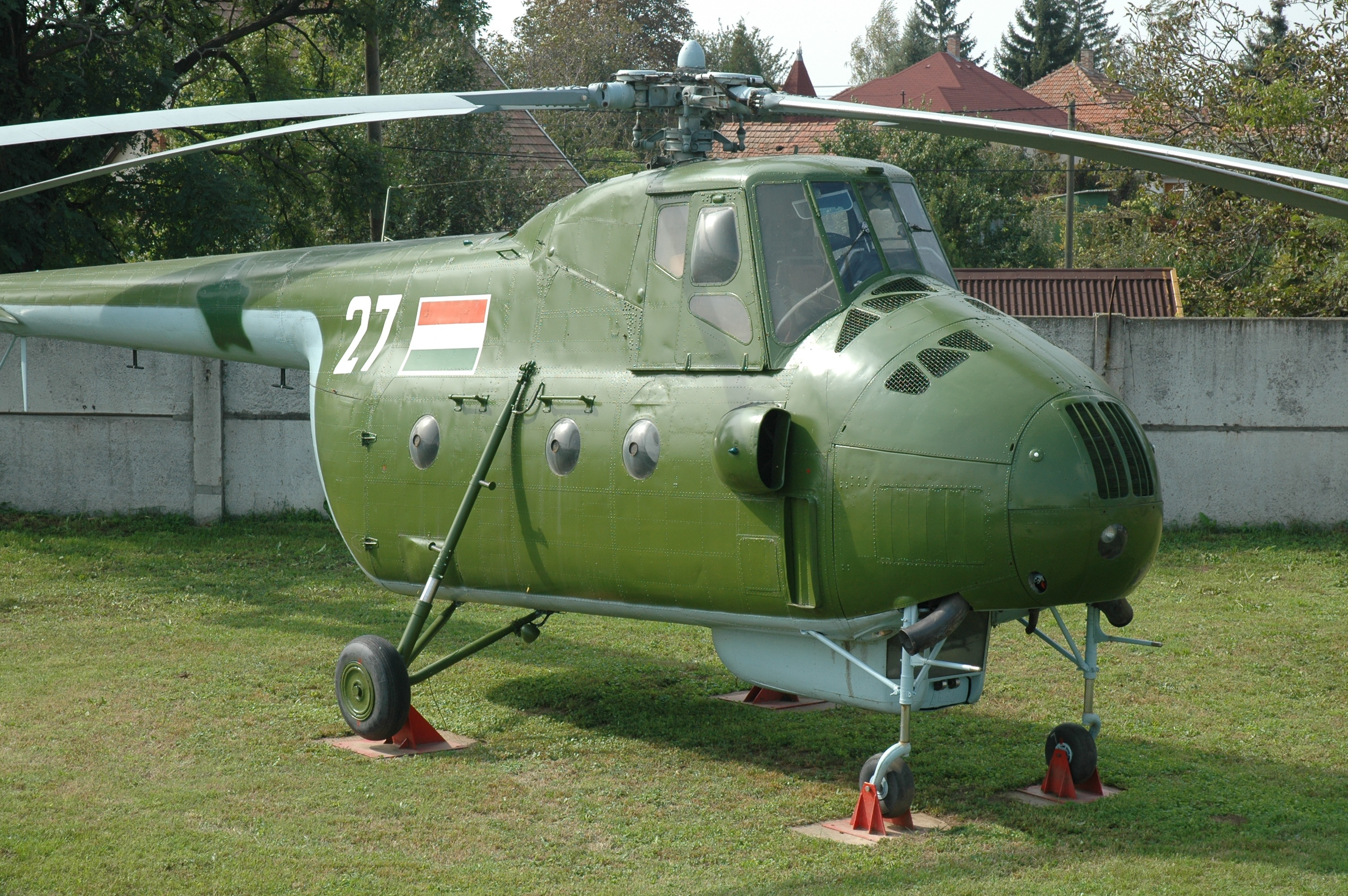
A Hungarian Mi-4

Hungarian People's Republic

- Hungarian Air Force

India

- Indian Air Force

India inducted the Mi-4 helicopter in the early 1960s, forming the backbone of its initial rotary-wing capability. It was acquired amidst geopolitical shifts and was later joined by the Mi-8 and other types, leading to a mixed-fleet scenario.

Indonesia

- Indonesian Air Force
- Indonesian Army

Iraq

- Iraqi Air Force

Khmer Republic

- Khmer Air Force

Laos

- Royal Lao Air Force

Laos

- Lao People's Liberation Army Air Force

Mali

- Mali Air Force

Mongolia

- Mongolian Air Force

North Korea

- North Korean Air Force

Pakistan

- Pakistan Army
- Oil & Gas Development Company

Polish People's Republic

- Polish Air Force
- Polish Navy

Socialist Republic of Romania

- Romanian Air Force

Somalia

- Somali Air Corps

Soviet Union

- Aeroflot
- Soviet Air Force
- Soviet Navy

Sudan

- Sudanese Air Force

Syria

- Syrian Air Force

Vietnam

- Vietnam People's Air Force

North Yemen

- North Yemen Air Force

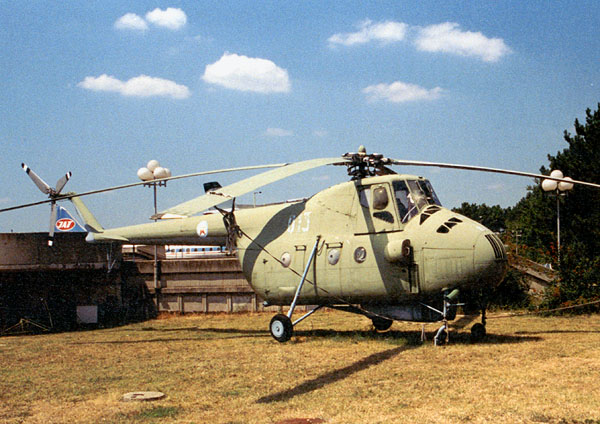
A Mil Mi-4 at Belgrade Aviation Museum

Yugoslavia

- Yugoslav Air Force

== Specifications (Mi-4A) ==
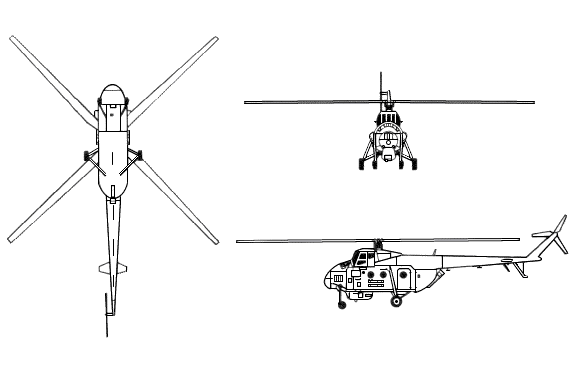
Mil Mi-4 3-view drawing

Data from www.globalsecurity.org/military/world/russia/mi-4-specs.htm

General characteristics

- Crew: 1 or 2
- Capacity: 16 troops or up to 1,600 kg (3,527 lb) of cargo
- Length: 16.8 m (55 ft 1 in)
- Height: 4.4 m (14 ft 5 in)
- Empty weight: 5,100 kg (11,244 lb)
- Gross weight: 7,150 kg (15,763 lb)
- Max takeoff weight: 7,550 kg (16,645 lb)
- Powerplant: 1 × Shvetsov ASh-82V 14-cylinder air-cooled radial piston engine, 1,250 kW (1,680 hp)
- Main rotor diameter: 21 m (68 ft 11 in)
- Main rotor area: 346.4 m^{2} (3,729 sq ft)

Performance

- Maximum speed: 185 km/h (115 mph, 100 kn)
- Range: 500 km (310 mi, 270 nmi)
- Service ceiling: 5,500 m (18,000 ft)
- Disk loading: 41 kg/m^{2} (8.4 lb/sq ft)
- Power/mass: 0.21 kW/kg (0.13 hp/lb)

== See also ==
Related development

- Harbin Z-5

Aircraft of comparable role, configuration, and era

- Sikorsky H-19
- Sikorsky H-34
- Westland Wessex

Related lists

- List of most-produced rotorcraft
