= American Airlines Flight 1 (1941) =

Crash over Ontario with no survivors

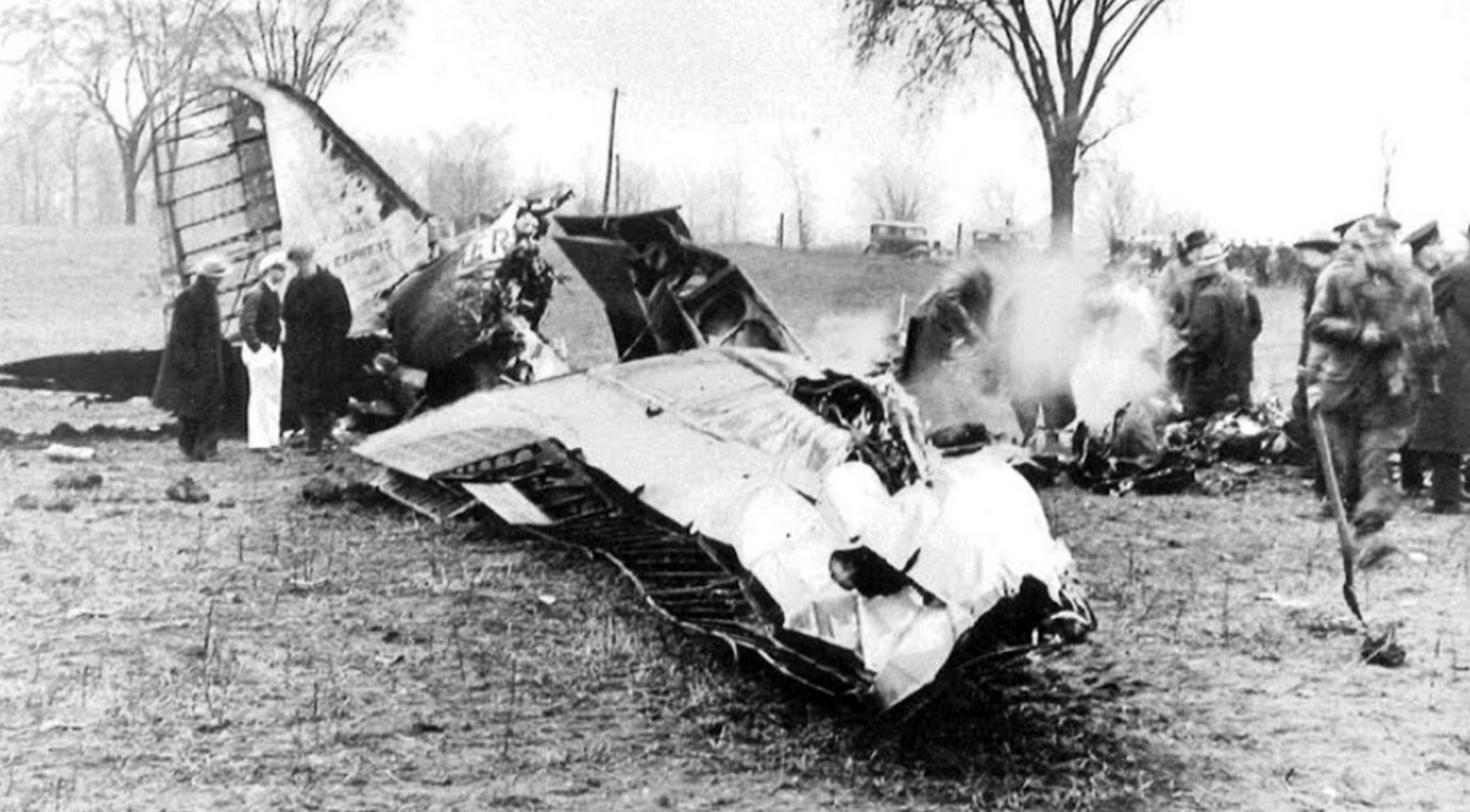
- Wreckage of the aircraft at the crash site

Accident
- Date: October 30, 1941
- Summary: Unknown
- Site: Lawrence Station, Southwold, Ontario, Canada; 42.762516°N 81.405637°W

Aircraft
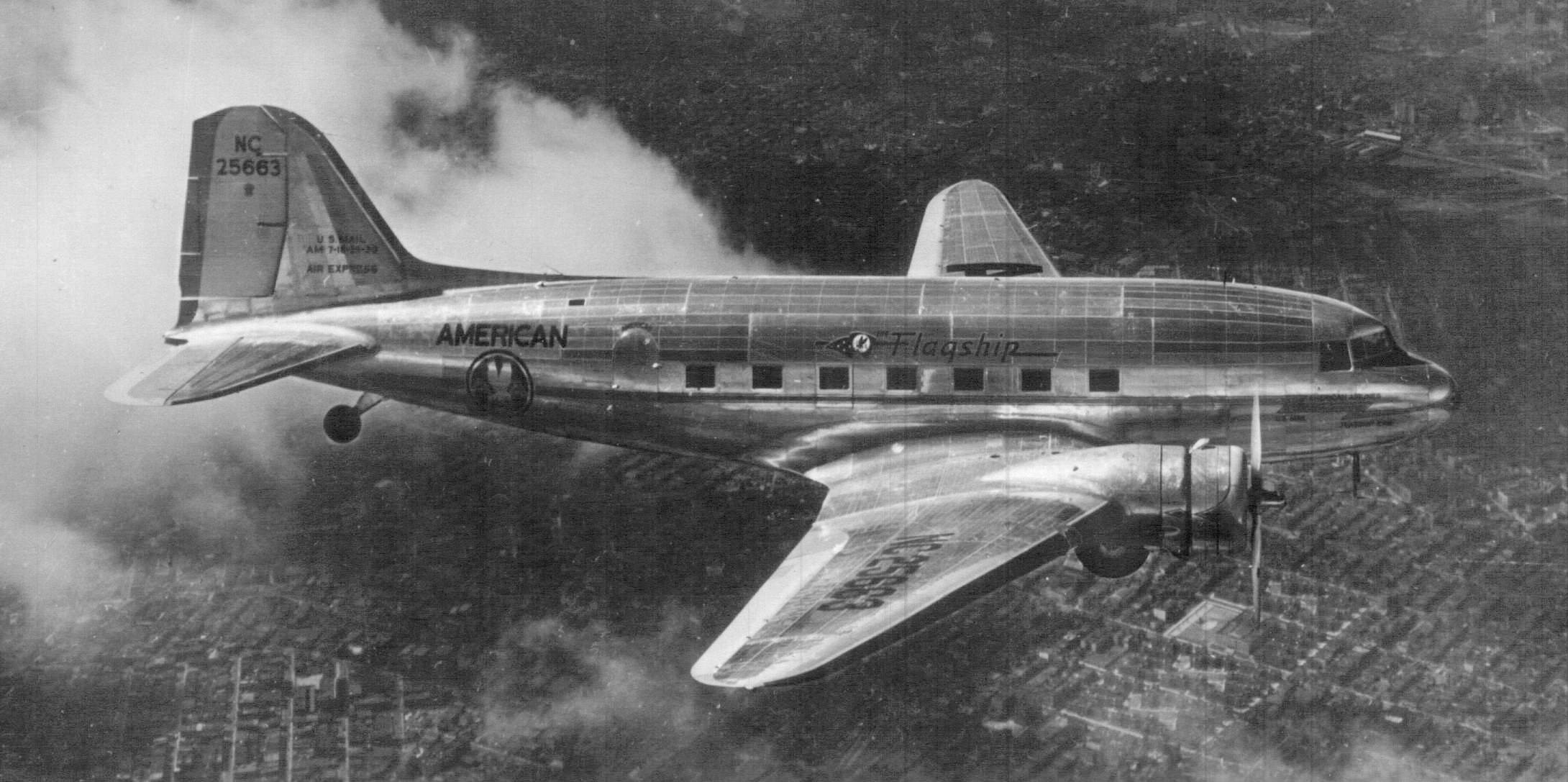
- NC25663, the aircraft involved in the accident, pictured in 1940
- Aircraft type: Douglas DC-3-277B
- Aircraft name: Flagship Erie
- Operator: American Airlines
- Registration: NC25663
- Flight origin: New York City
- 1st stopover: Newark, New Jersey
- 2nd stopover: Buffalo, New York
- 3rd stopover: Detroit, Michigan
- Last stopover: South Bend, Indiana
- Destination: Chicago, Illinois
- Occupants: 20
- Passengers: 17
- Crew: 3
- Fatalities: 20
- Survivors: 0

American Airlines Flight 1, (Note: Some sources claim that the flight number was 1AM7 or 1 AM-7) dubbed "the New Yorker", was a regularly scheduled passenger flight. On October 30, 1941, when the route was a multiple stop flight from La Guardia Airport to Chicago Municipal Airport with intermediate stops at Newark, New Jersey; Buffalo, New York; Detroit, Michigan; and South Bend, Indiana; on the flight's leg between Buffalo and Detroit, the American Airlines Douglas DC-3 operating the route crashed into a wheat field approximately one half mile east of the town of Lawrence Station, Ontario, southwest of London. All aboard, including 17 passengers and 3 crew, were killed. It was the second of three fatal crashes during an operation of American Airlines Flight 1.

== Accident ==
At 9:07 p.m., the plane departed from Buffalo. When the plane arrived near the area where the accident occurred, the plane started to descend, circled to the right and banked normally for the radius and speed of the turns. The diameter of the initial circle was approximately 1 1/2 miles; thereafter during the descent the radius progressively diminished. After completing approximately four circles, the airplane recovered from the spiral in close proximity to the ground, climbed suddenly to an altitude of about 200 to 500 feet and may have stalled. It then dived to the ground, striking in a nose-down attitude at an angle of approximately 70 degrees with the horizontal, and immediately burst into flames. Everyone onboard was killed.

== Cause ==
The probable cause of the crash was not determined in the published Civil Aeronautics Board accident report.

== Memorial ==
At the crash site, a plaque was erected on 10 September 2018 by Ray Lunn of the Southwold SS12 school committee, with help from the Green Lane Community Trust and the Southwold Township History Committee, to outline the events that unfolded in that accident and remember the victims of the accident.

== Book ==
A book, Final Descent: The Loss of the Flagship Erie, was written by Robert D. Schweyer and published posthumously by the Schweyer Family in 2014.

== Stage Play ==
A stage play about the accident, Lawrence Station: The Crash of American Airlines Flagship Erie, was written by Len Cuthbert and produced April 14–29, 2023, in Shedden, Ontario, Strathroy, Ontario and London, Ontario, by Fridge Door Live Theatre Company. The production was supported by Green Lane Community Trust, Township of Southwold, Wright Family Foundation, and seed money for writing from the Ontario Arts Council. On the 85th anniversary of the crash, an updated script by Len Cuthbert featuring original music by Fynn Cuthbert, was presented as Lawrence Station: The Flagship Erie's Final Flight. The production ran from October 29 - November 1, 2026, with performances in Shedden, Ontario and Strathroy, Ontario. It received support from the Green Lane Community Trust, Township of Southwold, Wright Family Foundation and Elgin County.
