= American Airlines Flight 1 (1936) =

1936 aircraft crash in Arkansas, US

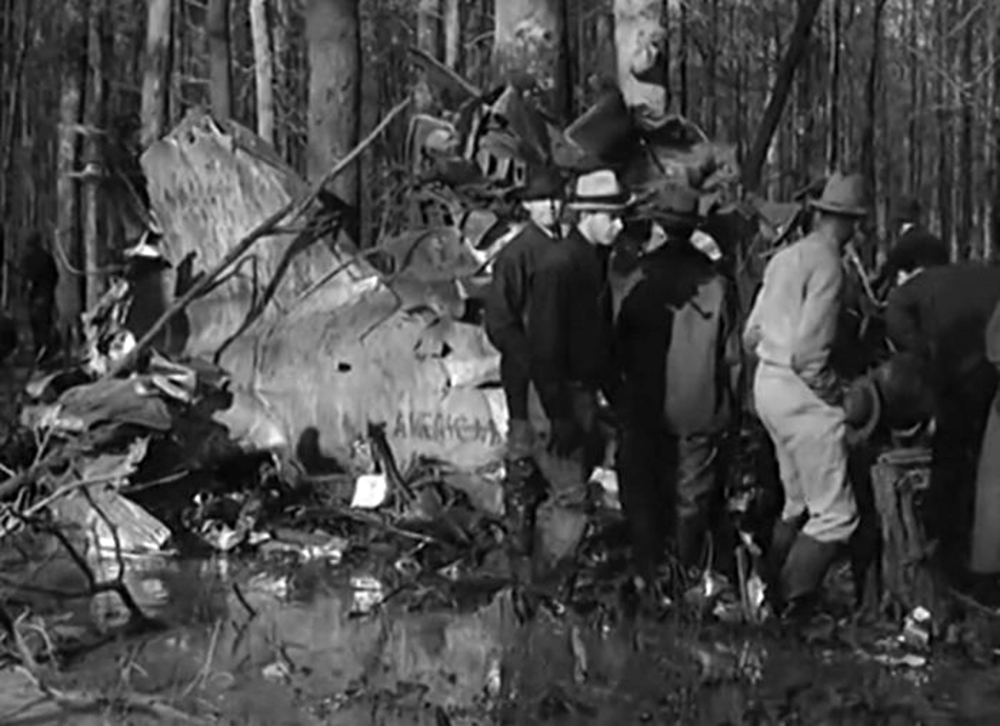
- Wreckage of the aircraft

Accident
- Date: January 14, 1936
- Summary: Crashed into swamp, cause undetermined (potential controlled flight into terrain)
- Site: Near Goodwin, Arkansas, United States; 34°58′01.1″N 91°01′20.4″W

Aircraft
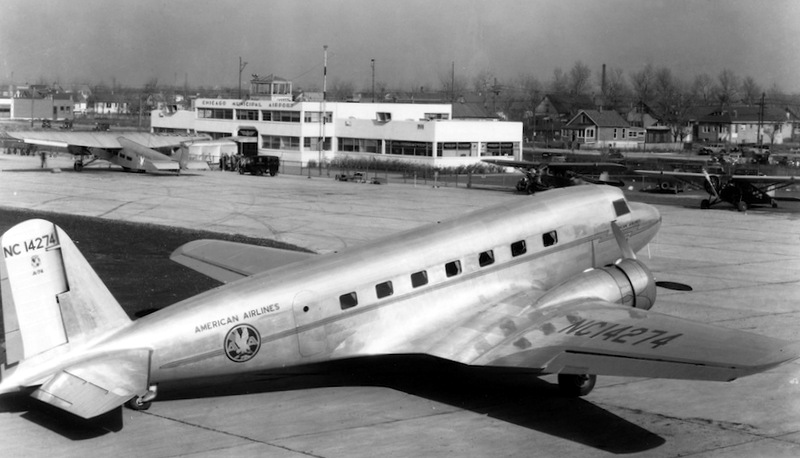
- NC14274, the aircraft involved in the accident, photographed in 1934
- Aircraft type: Douglas DC-2-120
- Aircraft name: Southerner
- Operator: American Airlines
- IATA flight No.: AA1
- ICAO flight No.: AAL1
- Call sign: AMERICAN 1
- Registration: NC14274
- Flight origin: Newark, New Jersey
- 1st stopover: Memphis Municipal Airport, Memphis, Tennessee
- 2nd stopover: Little Rock National Airport, Little Rock, Arkansas
- Last stopover: Dallas, Texas
- Destination: Los Angeles, California
- Occupants: 17
- Passengers: 14
- Crew: 3
- Fatalities: 17
- Injuries: 0
- Survivors: 0

American Airlines Flight 1 was a regularly scheduled domestic passenger flight. On January 14, 1936, a Douglas DC-2 airliner, operating the flight that day on its then Memphis to Little Rock route, crashed 14 minutes after departure. Everyone aboard, including 14 passengers and 3 crew members, were killed. The cause of the crash remains undetermined. As of 2025, it remains the deadliest crash in Arkansas state history.

== Background ==
=== Aircraft ===
The aircraft involved was a Douglas DC-2-120, registered NC14274, and had the manufacturing number 1307. Its first flight was in 1934. The aircraft was known as the Southerner.

=== Passengers and Crew ===
The flight was piloted by Captain Jerry Marshall and First Officer Glenn Freeland. Perla Gasparini was the only stewardess on board the plane. Also on board was William Reynolds Dyess, the Works Progress Administration (WPA) state administrator for Arkansas; Robert H. McNair Jr, the Work Progress Administration director of finance and reports for Arkansas; Frank C. Hart, a "millionaire oil man"; and 11 other passengers.

== Accident ==
On Tuesday, January 14, 1936, at 7:04 p.m., the aircraft departed from Memphis Municipal Airport. The last contact with the flight crew was at 7:18 p.m. as the aircraft was heading towards Little Rock. The aircraft later crashed into a swamp near Goodwin, Arkansas, about two miles (3.2 km) north of U.S. Highway 70, disintegrating on impact and killing all 17 people on board. The wreckage was scattered over 400 yards (370 meters) in four or five feet (1.2 or 1.5 metres) of water. The crash was the seventh hull loss and fifth fatal accident of the Douglas DC-2 at the time. This crash would be the first of three fatal crashes under the call sign of AAL1.

== Investigation ==
The U.S. Commerce Department appointed a board of inquiry led by Eugene T. Vidal to investigate the accident. At that time, there were different theories as to what happened on the aircraft, such as a piece of metal that appeared to have a bullet hole on it according to the Arkansas Gazette, or someone who may have hindered the pilot's actions while flying. On February 22, the board ruled out the possibility of a "purely mechanical failure". On March 7, the final report was issued and stated that flying at a low altitude, an interference with the pilots' sight by a passenger in the cockpit, the switching of an empty gas tank for a full one that may have caused a sudden drop into the tree line, and the first officer being "momentarily confused due to some minor difficulties" if he was alone in the cockpit it may have contributed to the cause of this accident, but the probable cause or causes thereof cannot be determined.

== Lawsuits ==
Due to the accident, at least three lawsuits were filed against American Airlines. The family of stewardess Perla Gasparini filed a federal lawsuit for undisclosed damages, the widow of crash victim Nathan Porter sued for $16,000 and the estate of Frank C. Hart settled a claim for $42,500.

== See also ==
- American Airlines Flight 1420
