= List of NATO reporting names for miscellaneous aircraft =

NATO reporting name/Air Standardization Coordinating Committee (ASCC) names for miscellaneous aircraft, with Soviet and Chinese designations, sorted by reporting name:

== Soviet Union/Russia ==
- "Madcap" Antonov An-71
- "Madge" Beriev Be-6
- "Maestro" Yakovlev Yak-28U
- "Magnet" Yakovlev Yak-17UTI
- "Magnum" Yakovlev Yak-30
- "Maiden" Sukhoi Su-9U
- "Mail" Beriev Be-12
- "Mainstay" Beriev A-50 (Airborne Early Warning (AEW) version of the Ilyushin Il-76)
- "Mallow" Beriev Be-10
- "Mandrake" Yakovlev Yak-25RV
- "Mangrove" Yakovlev Yak-27R
- "Mantis" Yakovlev Yak-32
- "Mare" Yakovlev Yak-14
- "Mark" Yakovlev Yak-7V
- "Mascot" Ilyushin Il-28U
- "Max" Yakovlev Yak-18
- "Maxdome" Ilyushin Il-80
- "May" Ilyushin Il-38
- "Maya" Aero L-29
- "Mermaid" Beriev Be-40
- "Midas" Ilyushin Il-78
- "Midget" Mikoyan-Gurevich MiG-15UTI
- "Mink" Yakovlev UT-2
- "Mist" Tsybin Ts-25
- "Mitten" Yakovlev Yak-130
- "Mole" Beriev Be-8
- "Mongol" Mikoyan-Gurevich MiG-21 two-seat trainer version
- "Moose" Yakovlev Yak-11
- "Mop" PBY Catalina
- "Moss" Tupolev Tu-126
- "Mote" Beriev MBR-2
- "Moujik" Sukhoi Su-7U
- "Mug" Beriev Be-4
- "Mule" Po-2 (U-2)
- "Mystic" Myasishchev M-17/M-55

NATO reporting name/ASCC names for miscellaneous aircraft, with Soviet designations, sorted by Soviet designation:

- Aero L-29 "Maya"
- Antonov An-71 "Madcap"
- Beriev A-50 "Mainstay"
- Beriev Be-2 "Mote"
- Beriev Be-4 "Mug"
- Beriev Be-6 "Madge"
- Beriev Be-8 "Mole"
- Beriev Be-10 "Mallow"
- Beriev Be-12 "Mail"
- Beriev Be-40 "Mermaid"
- Beriev MBR-2 "Mote"
- Ilyushin Il-28U "Mascot"
- Ilyushin Il-38 "May"
- Ilyushin Il-78 "Midas"
- Ilyushin Il-86VKP "Maxdome"
- Myasishchev M-17/M-55 "Mystic"
- Mikoyan-Gurevich MiG-15UTI "Midget"
- Mikoyan-Gurevich MiG-21 "Mongol" two-seat trainer version
- PBY Catalina "Mop"
- Po-2 (U-2) "Mule"
- Sukhoi Su-7U "Moujik"
- Sukhoi Su-9U "Maiden"
- Tsybin Ts-25 "Mist"
- Tupolev Tu-126 "Moss"
- Yakovlev UT-2 "Mink"
- Yakovlev Yak-7V "Mark"
- Yakovlev Yak-11 "Moose"
- Yakovlev Yak-14 "Mare"
- Yakovlev Yak-17UTI "Magnet"
- Yakovlev Yak-18 "Max"
- Yakovlev Yak-28U "Maestro"
- Yakovlev Yak-25RV "Mandrake"
- Yakovlev Yak-27R "Mangrove"
- Yakovlev Yak-30 "Magnum"
- Yakovlev Yak-32 "Mantis"
- Yakovlev Yak-130 "Mitten"

== China ==
- Shaanxi Y-8JB "Mace"
- Shaanxi Y-8X "Maid"
- Shaanxi KJ-2000 "Mainring"
- Shaanxi Y-8J "Mask"
- Shaanxi KJ-200 "Moth"

== See also ==
- NATO reporting name
