= Georgy Beriev =

Soviet aerospace engineer (1903-1979)

- Георгий Бериев გიორგი ბერიაშვილი
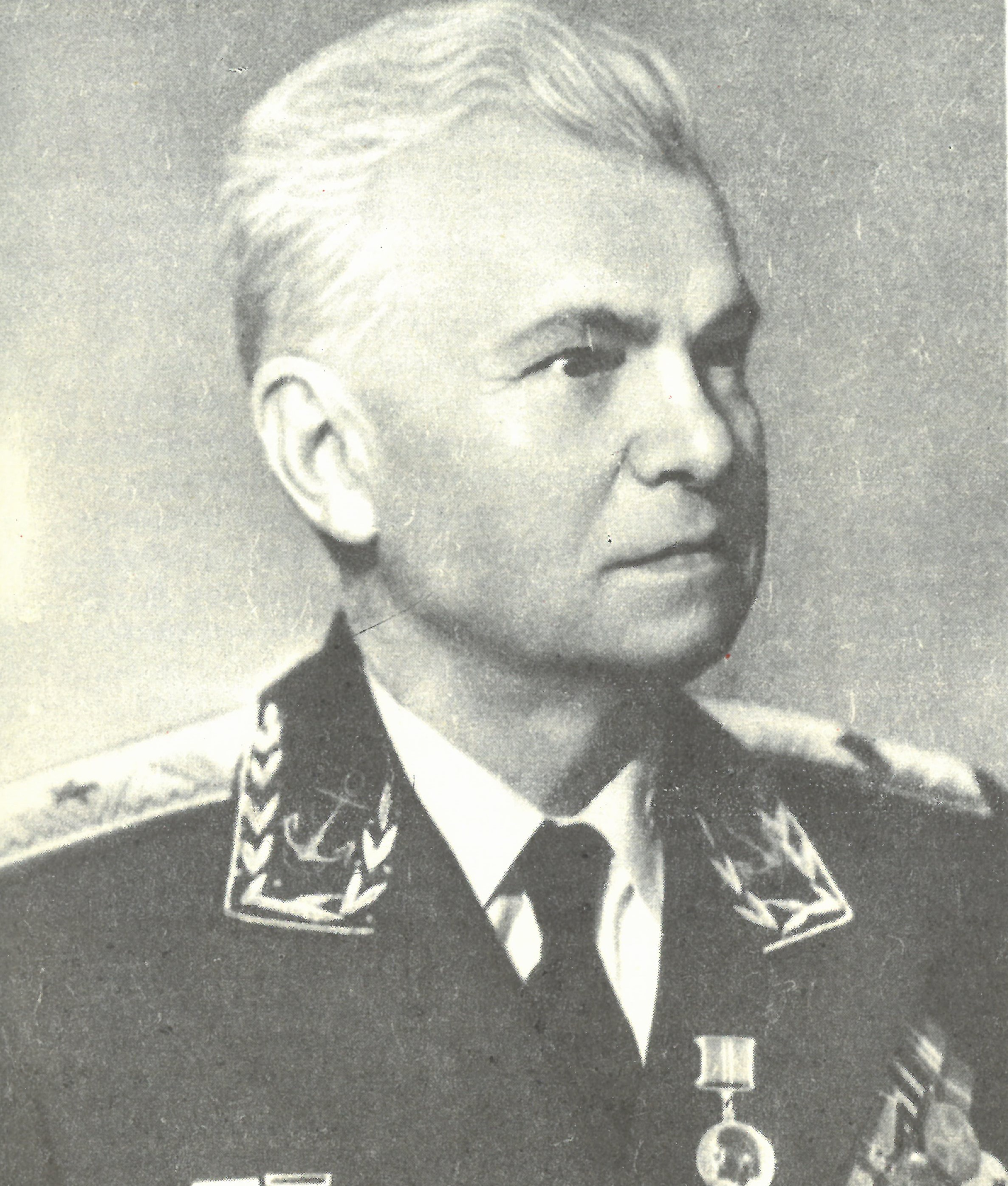
- Beriev in 1950
- Born: 13 February 1903; Tbilisi, Tiflis Governorate, Russian Empire
- Died: 12 July 1979 (aged 76); Moscow, USSR
- Engineering career
- Discipline: Aeronautical Engineering
- Employer: Beriev design bureau
- Significant design: Be-2, MBR-2, Be-6, Be-10, Be-12, R-1, B-30
- Awards: Stalin Prize; Order of Lenin

Georgy Mikhailovich Beriev (Beriashvili) (Russian: Георгий Михайлович Бериев Georgij Michajlovič Beriev; Georgian: გიორგი მიხეილის ძე ბერიაშვილი Giorgi Mikheilis Dze Beriashvili; 13 February 1903 – 12 July 1979), was a Soviet Georgian major general, founder and chief designer of the Beriev Design Bureau in Taganrog, which concentrated on amphibious aircraft.

== Biography ==
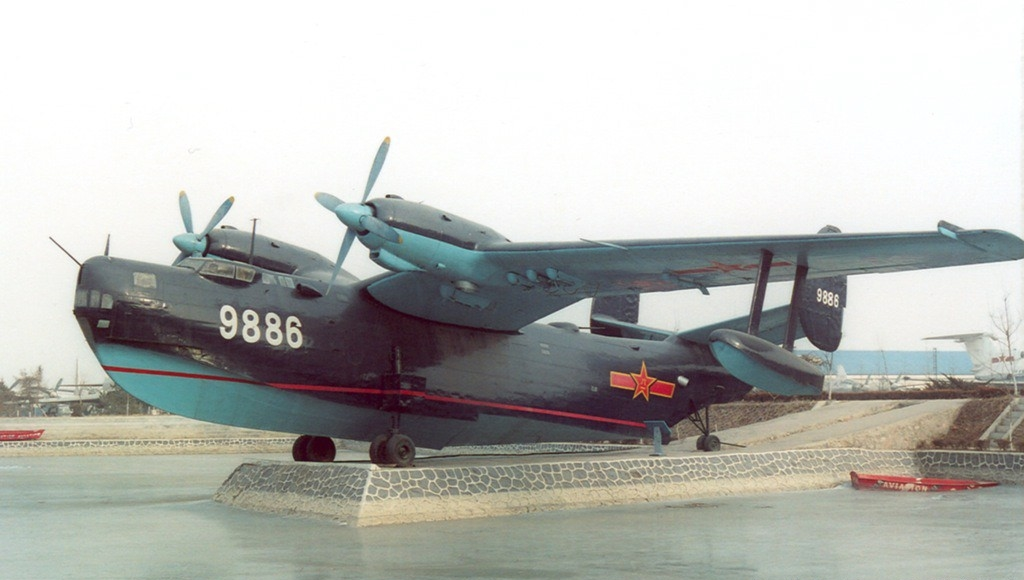
Soviet Be-6

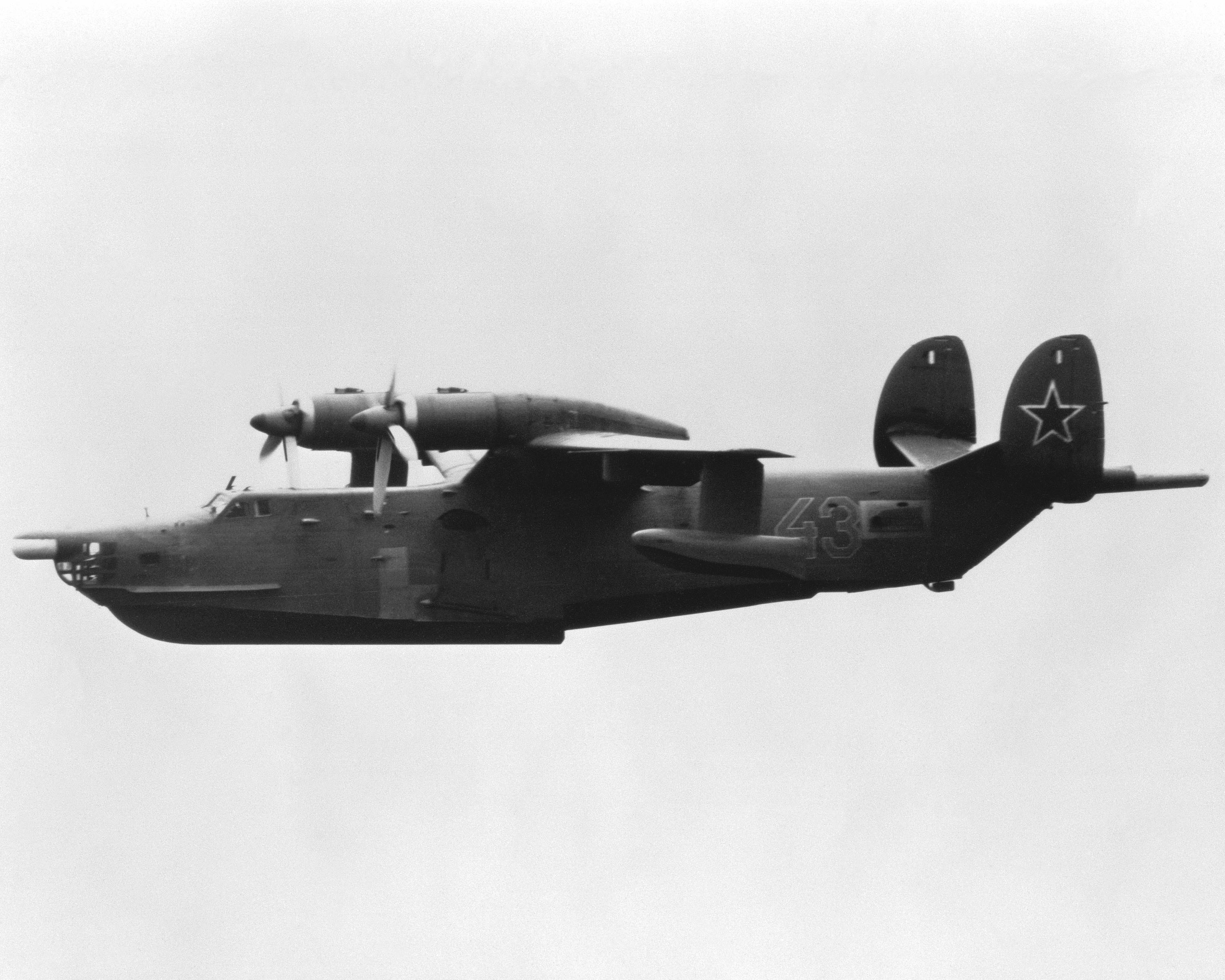
Soviet Be-12

Beriev was born in Tbilisi in the Tiflis Governorate (present day Tbilisi, Georgia) of the Russian Empire. Of ethnic Georgian origin, his antecedents are uncertain, and it is not known when his family name was Russified from Beriashvili to Beriev. After graduating from the railway school in Tbilisi in 1923, he attended the School of Shipbuilding Engineering at the Leningrad Polytechnic Institute (now Saint Petersburg State Polytechnic University), and graduated with an engineering degree in 1930. He worked as an aircraft designer at the Central Design Office "WR Menzhinsky", where he developed the Beriev MBR-2 seaplane. From October 1934 to 1968, he ran the Central Design Office for marine aircraft in Taganrog, where he developed numerous successful, and often unique, amphibious aircraft designs.

In 1947, he was awarded the Stalin Prize for his work on the Be-6. He was also twice awarded the Order of Lenin and twice the Order of the Red Banner of Labour. In 1968, for the Be-12 (1968) design, he was awarded the USSR State Prize.

After retirement, he moved to Moscow and died in 1979.

== Awards and honors ==
- Medal "For the Victory over Germany in the Great Patriotic War 1941–1945" (1945)
- Stalin Prize (1947)
- Order of Lenin (1945, 1953)
- Medal "For Battle Merit" (1955)
- Order of the Red Banner of Labour (1963, 1966)
- USSR State Prize (1968)

== Memory ==
- By Order of the Council of Ministers of the RSFSR of December 6, 1989 PJSC Beriev Aircraft Company named after G. M. Beriev.
- Bust on the territory of the TANTK in Taganrog.
- Bust in the city Zhukovsky, Moscow Oblast (in the park named after V. V. Mayakovsky).
- A memorial plaque on a passing tank in Taganrog.
- A memorial plaque in Taganrog on the house where he lived.
- A memorial plaque in Moscow on the building where he worked in the 1920s and 1930s.
- A memorial plaque in Krasnoyarsk on the house where he worked during the war.
- Memorial plaque on the main building of Peter the Great St. Petersburg Polytechnic University
- Streets in Taganrog and Tbilisi are named after him.

== See also ==
- Alexander Kartveli
- Aleksandr Nadiradze
- Michael Gregor
