= Kamov Ka-31 =

Kamov helicopter

Ka-31
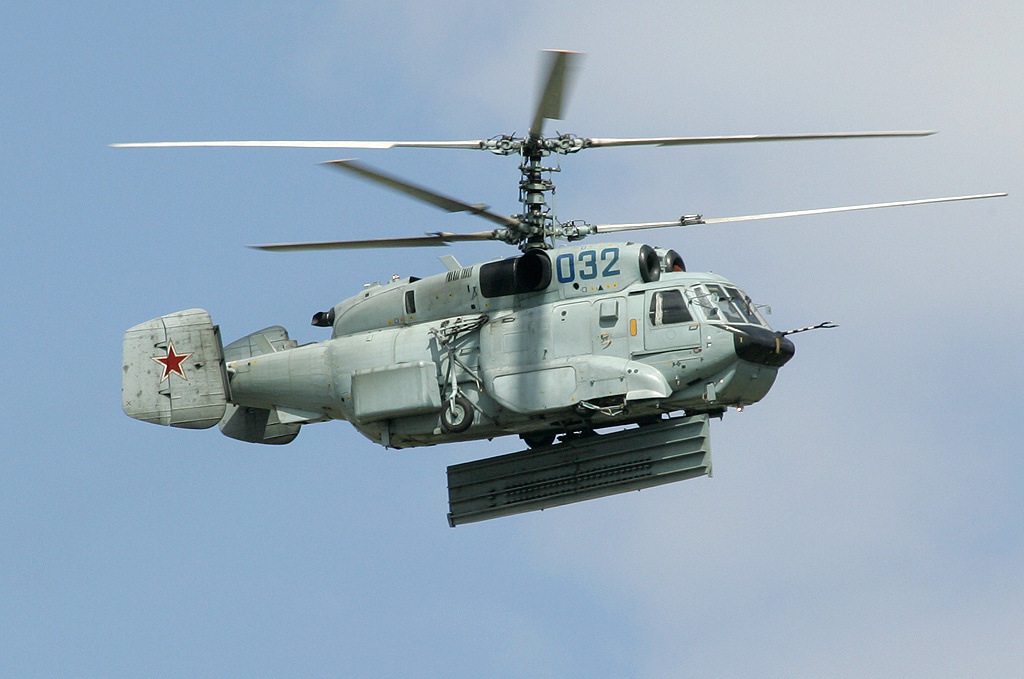
- Ka-31 in 2005

General information
- Type: Airborne early warning and control
- Manufacturer: Kamov
- Status: In service, In production
- Primary users: Russian Navy Indian Naval Air Arm; People's Liberation Army Navy
- Number built: 28

History
- Manufactured: 1985–present
- Introduction date: 1995
- First flight: 1987
- Developed from: Kamov Ka-27

The Kamov Ka-31 (NATO reporting name Helix) is a military helicopter originally developed for the Soviet Navy and currently in service in Russia, China, and India in the naval airborne early warning and control role.

As with all Kamov helicopters except the Ka-60/-62 family, the Ka-31 has co-axially mounted contra-rotating main rotors. The airframe of the Ka-31 is based on the Kamov Ka-27. One visually distinctive feature of the Ka-31 is the large antenna of the early-warning radar, which is either rotating or folded and stowed under the fuselage. The second is the reduction of the bulky electro-optical sensory suite beneath the cockpit. The landing gear retracts in order to prevent interference with the radar.

== Design and development ==
The Kamov design bureau was asked by the Soviet Navy to begin the development of an early-warning helicopter in 1985. A carrier-capable early-warning aircraft, the Yakovlev Yak-44, was already in development, but it would not be deployable on all ship types. Designed on the basis of the Kamov Ka-27, the new helicopter, initially known as the Ka-252RLD, was primarily intended to serve on Kiev-class and Kuznetsov-class aircraft carriers, but also on other ships with a helicopter deck. Two prototypes based on series Ka-29 airframes were built. In the end, the helicopter received the designation Ka-31.

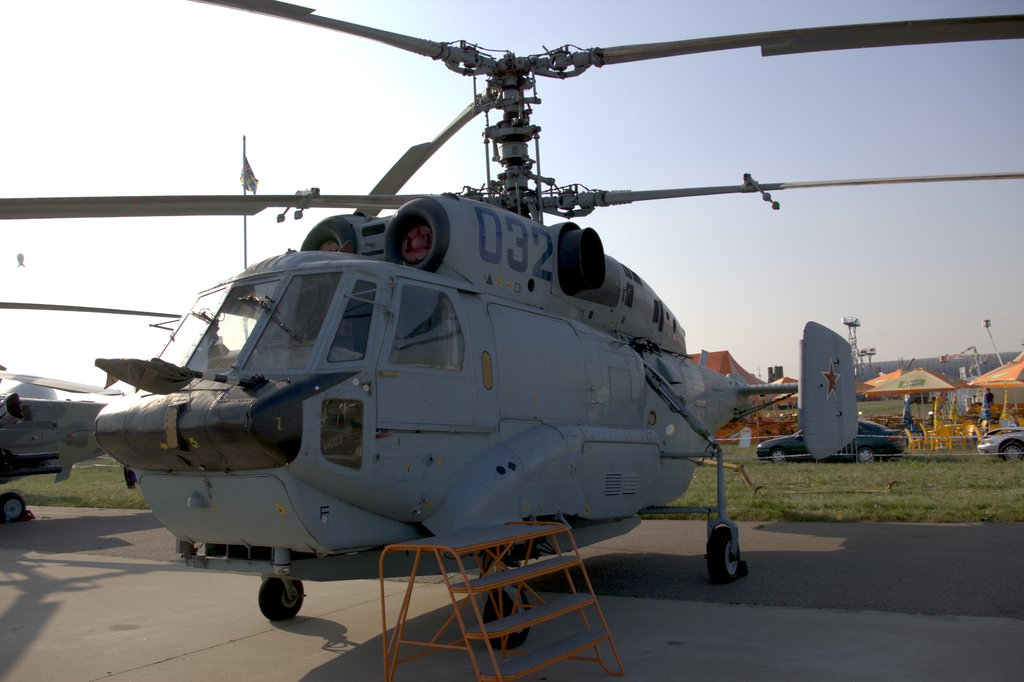
Kamov Ka-31 at MAKS 2007

The Nizhny Novgorod Radio Engineering Institute was working on a radar design to be used on the Antonov An-71; the same design was applied with changes for a rotary-wing airframe. The radar's development took time and it was not until 1987 the first flight took place. The production version of the Ka-31 was very different from the Ka-29 from which it was derived.

Some of the distinct features of the Kamov Ka-31 are:

- The removal of the bulky electro-optical sensor suite, beneath the cockpit.
- The cockpit is wider than the Ka-27/29, with 2 additional MFDs.
- The ASW capability is not installed.
- The addition of Kronstadt Kabris 12-channel global positioning system.
- The powerplant is a more powerful Klimov TV3-117VMAR x 2. (the Ka-27 uses TV3-117BK)
- The TA-8Ka APU is added to provide power for the radar and C4ISR
- 16-channel digital communication gear with range up to 250 miles (400 km).

The Ka-31 is equipped with the E-801 Oko L-band radar, capable of detecting and tracking up to 40 targets simultaneously, flying from 5 to 3,500 meters altitude. The detection range is 110 km for a fighter-aircraft-sized target, and 200 km for ship-sized targets. The antenna is six meters wide and one meter high, and rotates six times per minute. The radar can work in air-to-air, air-to-sea, and "mixed" (both at the same time) modes. The landing gear is retractable, in order to avoid interfering with the radar's functioning. When not in use, the radar's antenna is retracted under the fuselage. Due to its relatively small size, the Ka-31 doesn't have the capability to process the information collected by its radar. Instead, it transfers the information to nearby ships for them to do so.

== Operational history ==
The Ka-31's state trials began in 1988, with ship-based trials taking place between 1990 and 1991 on the carrier Admiral Kuznetsov. However, the dissolution of the Soviet Union and the termination of the aircraft carrier projects pursued at the time spelled the end of the Ka-31 project: an order for eight helicopters was cancelled. Still, the test were continued, and the Ka-31 was officially accepted for service with the Russian Navy in 1995. Both Ka-31 prototypes were then deployed on board Admiral Kuznetsov during each of its cruises.

The Indian Navy ordered four Ka-31s in 1999, and a further five in 2001. The first batch of four entered service with the Indian Navy in April 2003. The second batch was delivered in 2005. Five additional Ka-31s were ordered in 2009, and they were delivered between 2011 and 2012. As of 2019, India was considering another order for 10 Ka-31s, together with the modernisation of 10 of the 14 helicopters already in service. In May 2022, the Indian government indefinitely suspended the negotiations with Rosoboronexport due to concerns over Moscow’s ability to execute orders and issues related to payment transfers.

During the period when with the retirement of an old carrier, the Indian Navy was operating a single carrier, it not only operated the helicopters from aircraft carriers and destroyers, but also from its shore-based naval air stations. The operation with the Indian Navy revealed a major drawback of the aircraft, its limited endurance/range, the chief element of a taskforce/battlegroup. In response, Hindustan Aeronautics Limited was commissioned to experiment and possibly adapt a helicopter-to-helicopter refuelling system. Also, in the Indian service, the aircraft received Abris GPS system featuring a 12-channel receiver and option to employ Differential GPS references, designed by Kronstad itself.

In 2008, China ordered nine Ka-31s to equip the People's Liberation Army Navy's carriers. The helicopters were delivered between 2010 and 2011. It has since been reported that Chinese Ka-31s are based at naval bases in eastern China.

In 2008, Russia ordered two Ka-31Rs with one more as an option, in order to equip its Mistral-class amphibious assault ships. They were delivered in 2012. Russia has also developed a land-based variant of the Ka-31R, the Ka-35. This variant is optimised for the detection and tracking of ground targets. The first prototype first flew in 2004, and a second was built in 2006. The Ka-35 was officially accepted for service in 2015, and it was used in Syria in 2016. No order for this version has been signed as of yet.

== Variants ==
Ka-31
Original variant, sold to India and China.
Ka-31R
Variant currently used by the Russian Navy.
Ka-35
Land-based version of the Ka-31R. Original E-801 radar replaced with the 15S100.10, optimised for detection and tracking of ground targets. Modernised cockpit, new navigation and communication systems and datalink. Fitted with the Vitebsk self-protection system.

== Operators ==
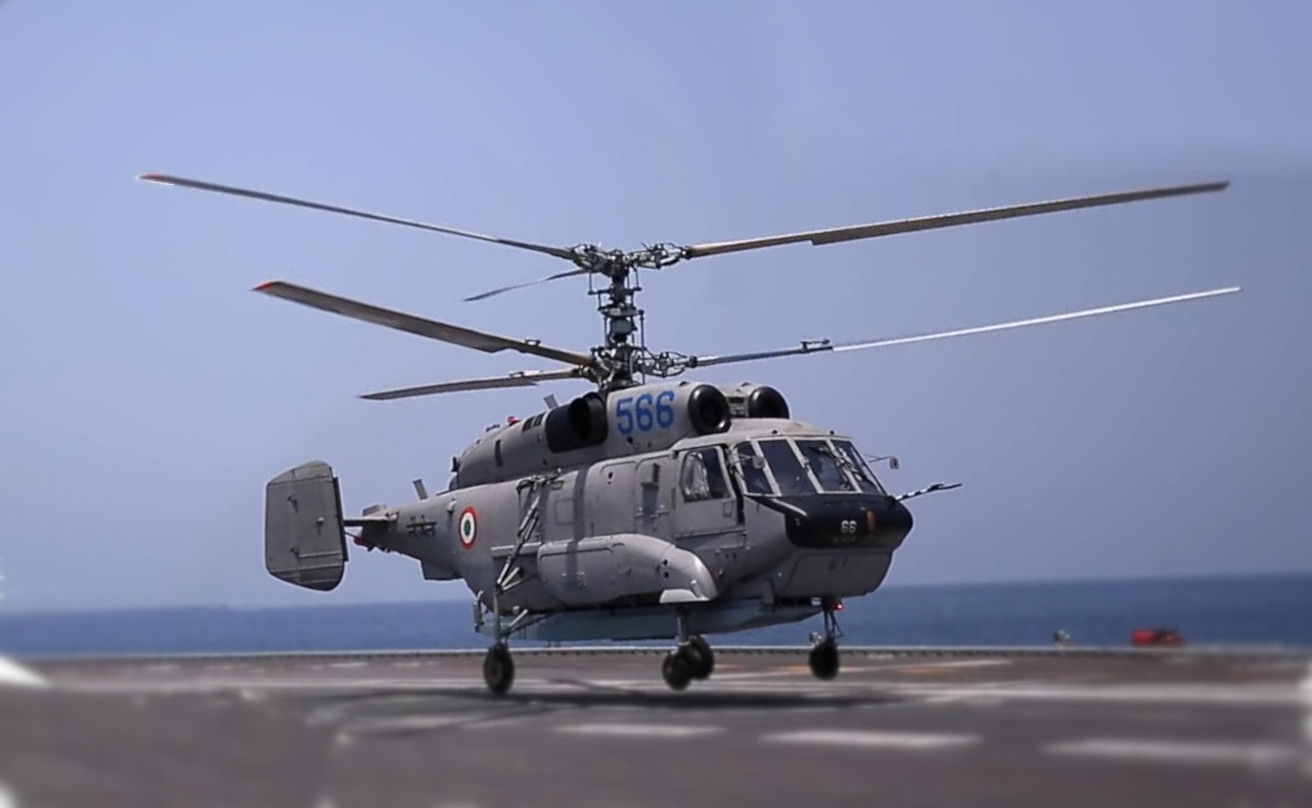
Kamov Ka-31 of Indian Navy onboard INS Vikramaditya

China

- People's Liberation Army Naval Air Force – nine Ka-31s.

India

- Indian Naval Air Arm – 14 Ka-31s.

Russia

- Russian Naval Aviation – two Ka-31Rs.
- Russian Ground Forces – two Ka-35 prototypes.

== Specifications (Ka-31) ==
Data from Soviet/Russian AWACS aircraft : Tu-126, A-50, An-71 and Ka-31 AWACS and Hawkeyes : the complete history of airborne early warning aircraft

General characteristics

- Crew: 2
- Length: 12.5 m (41 ft 0 in) rotors folded

11.25 m (37 ft) fuselage only

- Height: 5.6 m (18 ft 4 in)
- Gross weight: 12,500 kg (27,558 lb)
- Powerplant: 2 × Isotov TV3-117VMA turboshaft engines, 1,864 kW (2,500 hp) each take-off / contingency rating
- Main rotor diameter: 2 × 15.9 m (52 ft 2 in)
- Main rotor area: 397.2 m^{2} (4,275 sq ft)

Performance

- Maximum speed: 250 km/h (160 mph, 130 kn)
- Cruise speed: 205 km/h (127 mph, 111 kn)
- Range: 600 km (370 mi, 320 nmi) max. fuel with radar antenna stowed
- Endurance: 2 hours 30 minutes on-station loiter at 3,500 m (11,500 ft)

== See also ==
Related development

- Kamov Ka-27

Aircraft of comparable role, configuration, and era

- AgustaWestland AW101 Merlin ASaC5
- Westland WS-61 Sea King ASaC7
- Changhe Z-8AEW
- Changhe Z-18J
- Eurocopter AS532 Cougar Horizon
- E-2 Hawkeye

Related lists

- List of military aircraft of the Soviet Union and the CIS
- List of rotorcraft
