= Beriev Be-10 =

1956 maritime patrol flying boat model by Beriev

Be-10
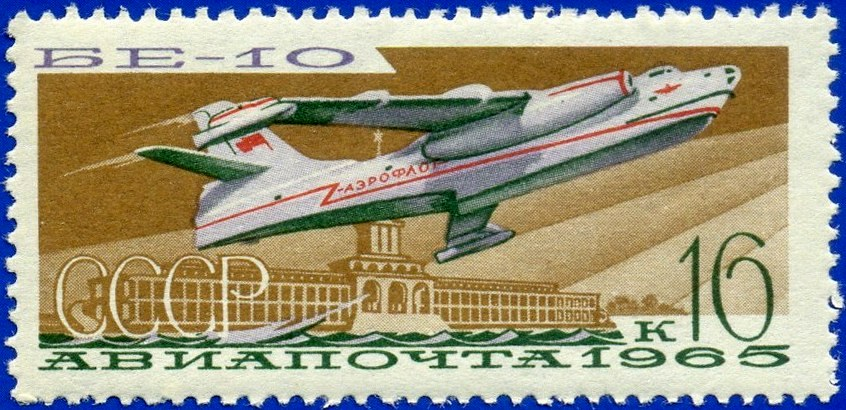
- USSR post stamp (1965)

General information
- Type: Patrol bomber
- Manufacturer: Beriev OKB (OKB-49)
- Status: Retired
- Primary user: Soviet Naval Aviation
- Number built: 28

History
- Manufactured: 1958–1961
- First flight: 20 June 1956

The Beriev Be-10, also known as Izdelye M, (NATO reporting name: Mallow) was a twin engined, turbojet powered, flying-boat, patrol bomber built by the Soviet Union from 1955. The Be-10 is sometimes referred to as the M-10, though this designation is believed to apply only to the modified Be-10 that established 12 FAI world records in 1961, Bort no. 40 Yellow, still holding class records for speed and altitude.

== Design and development ==
The Be-10 was designed in response to Council of Ministers of the Soviet Union directive No.2622-1105ss which called for a turbojet-powered flying boat for open-sea reconnaissance, bombing, torpedo attack and mine-laying. Stipulated performance was to include a maximum speed of 950 to 1,000 km/h (590 to 621 mph) and the ability to operate in wave heights of 1.5 m (5 ft) at wind speeds up to 20 m/s (45 mph) with submission for state acceptance trials in November 1955.

OKB-49, under the leadership of Gheorgiy M. Beriev took up the challenge of designing and building the izdeliye M (Beriev OKB in-house designation), approval to proceed with prototype manufacture was received in mid-1954, but OKB-49 did not have facilities to build the prototype, so this was performed at the nearby GAZ no.89 (Gosudarstvenny Aviatsionnyy Zavod – state aviation plant/factory), also known as TMZD (Taganrogskiy Mashinostroitel'nyy Zavod imeeni Dimitrova – Taganrog Machinery Plant named after Gheorgi Dimitrov).

Beriev realised that the Be-10 would be ready for trials during the winter of 1955, but Taganrog, where the OKB was located, is ice-bound in winter, so an alternative site was chosen at Gelendzhik on the Black Sea coast, which is clear of ice all year round. The completed components of the first prototype were transported to Gelendzhik where they were assembled and trials begun on 20 December 1955. Initial ground running of the engines revealed potentially disastrous vibration of the rear fuselage, which caused cracking of skin and structural components as well as loosening nuts and fasteners, also the fracture of pipeline and wiring loom support brackets. To reduce the vibration caused by the jet exhaust, the jet-pipes were splayed outboard by a further 3° to 6°. The prototype also underwent trial installation of raised extended air intakes to reduce water ingestion, but they were not adopted for in-service aircraft due to the degradation in performance.

After the first flight of the Be-10 on 20 June 1956, manufacturers flight testing lasted a total of 76 flights up to 20 October 1958, whence the prototype was submitted for state acceptance trials along with the first production aircraft. Anticipating that any deficiencies could be rectified during production or by modification, production of 27 examples for service with Soviet Naval Aviation (AV-MF) was authorised from 1958 to 1961.

The Be-10 is an all-metal high-wing monoplane with the engines located beneath the wing roots and with splayed-out tailpipes. To minimize the risk of water ingestion, the engine air intakes are located on the forward fuselage section with spray fences on either side of the bow protecting the engines from water ingestion. The streamlined hull was fitted with a shallow single-step, sea rudder under the rear fuselage, 50° swept wings with marked anhedral and balance floats attached by short pylons at the wing-tips.

Conventional swept-back stressed skin construction tail surfaces were a 35° sweptback fin and 40° swept tail-planes just above the rear fuselage. Control surfaces were ailerons on each wing, a rudder on the fin and elevators on the tail-planes. The fuselage has a high length-to-beam ratio to improve rough water handling, a v-section planing bottom, two steps and was divided into nine water-tight compartments the forward and rear compartments being pressurised. Engine nacelles for the Lyul'ka AL-7F engines were attached to the fuselage sides under the wing centre-section.

The original design showed some weaknesses in the seaworthiness and had to be modified; after modification the Be-10 was seaworthy up to a wave height of 1.2 meters (4 feet) and able to fly with wind speeds up to 31 knots (57.6 km/h; 36 mph) from water or land.

== Operational history ==
Operational use of the Be-10 began when the 2nd Squadron of the 977th Independent Naval Long-range Reconnaissance Air Regiment (977th OMDRAP) started replacing its Beriev Be-6 flying boats with Be-10 aircraft. This squadron and the 1st Squadron of the 977th OMDRAP became the only operators of the Be-10, operating from a naval base at Lake Donuzlav on the Crimean peninsula

The first public appearance of the Be-10 was when four aircraft flew over the 1961 Aviation Day air display at Tushino, giving the impression that the Be-10 was already in service. However, the Be-10 proved to be difficult to fly and there were several accidents. The Be-10 suffered from metal fatigue due to the stress on the airframe from the high-speed takeoffs and landings, together with corrosion. The Be-10 was removed from service in 1968, and was replaced by the turboprop-powered Be-12, which was easier to operate and had better endurance.

== Operators ==
Data from:

Soviet Union

- Soviet Naval Aviation (AV-MF)
  - 1st Squadron of the 977th OMDRAP
  - 2nd Squadron of the 977th OMDRAP

== Variants ==
Izdeliye M
The Be-10 prototype (public name "product M") completed in 1955 and flown on 20 June 1956 from Gelendzhik on the Black Sea. One built.
Be-10
The standard production version built for the AV-MF, 27 built from 1958 to 1961.
Be-10N
Proposed cruise missile carrier to be part of the K-12B airborne strike system, carrying two K-12BS cruise missiles on pylons under the wings. Although reaching mock-up stages and being granted approval from the Gosudarstvenny Komitet Po Aviatsionny Tekhnike ("state committee on aircraft technology") Scientific & Technical Council, no further action was authorised.
Be-10S
A proposed anti submarine warfare seaplane project to have been armed with the SK-1 Skal'p ("Scalp") nuclear depth charge. No hardware was built.
Be-10U
A proposed Target designator seaplane project to have been fitted with the Uspekh radar system, to pass targeting information to ship or shore based missile or artillery batteries. Discontinued by August 1960.
Be-10 Trainer
A proposed trainer version with a duplicate set of controls in a cockpit in the extreme nose. Conversions were to have taken place, but there is no evidence that any were completed.
M-10
A single Be-10, (c/n 0600505), Bort No. 40 Yellow, modified to attempt record breaking flights in 1961. The tail turret was removed and faired over, an additional pitot tube was fitted to the fin, and guns removed. Twelve world records were broken, some of which still stand.

== World records ==
The M-10 (modified from a Be-10) set twelve new world records in 1961, ratified by the FAI

Data from: FAI
Category	Record	Pilot	Date
Speed over a 15 km (9.32 mi) to 25 km (16 mi) track	912 km/h (566.69 mph)	N.I. Andriyevskiy	7 August 1961
Speed over a 1,000 km (621 mi) circuit with no payload.	875.86 km/h (544.23 mph)	G.I. Boor'yanov	3 September 1961
Speed over a 1,000 km (621 mi) circuit with 1,000 kg (2,205 lb) payload.	875.86 km/h (544.23 mph)	G.I. Boor'yanov	3 September 1961
Speed over a 1,000 km (621 mi) circuit with 2,000 kg (4,409 lb) payload.	875.86 km/h (544.23 mph)	G.I. Boor'yanov	3 September 1961
Speed over a 1,000 km (621 mi) circuit with 5,000 kg (11,023 lb) payload.	875.86 km/h (544.23 mph)	G.I. Boor'yanov	3 September 1961
Altitude with 1,000 kg (2,205 lb) payload.	14,062 m (46,135.17 ft)	G.I. Boor'yanov	8 September 1961
Altitude with 2,000 kg (4,409 lb) payload.	14,062 m (46,135.17 ft)	G.I. Boor'yanov	8 September 1961
Altitude with 5,000 kg (11,023 lb) payload.	14,062 m (46,135.17 ft)	G.I. Boor'yanov	8 September 1961
Altitude.	14,062 m (46,135.17 ft)	G.I. Boor'yanov	9 September 1961
Altitude with 10,000 kg (22,046 lb) payload.	12,733 m (41,774.93 ft)	G.I. Boor'yanov	11 September 1961
Altitude with 15,000 kg (33,069 lb) payload.	11,997 m (39,360.24 ft)	G.I. Boor'yanov	12 September 1961
Maximum payload to an altitude of 2,000 m (6,562 ft)	15,206 kg (33,523.49 lb)	G.I. Boor'yanov	12 September 1961

== Specifications (Be-10) ==
Data from Beriev's Jet Flying Boats

General characteristics

- Crew: 3
- Length: 31.45 m (103 ft 2 in)
- Wingspan: 28.6 m (93 ft 10 in)
- Height: 10.7 m (35 ft 1 in)
- Wing area: 130 m^{2} (1,400 sq ft)
- Empty weight: 27,356 kg (60,310 lb)
- Gross weight: 45,000 kg (99,208 lb)
- Max takeoff weight: 48,500 kg (106,924 lb)
- Fuel capacity: 18,750 kg (41,337 lb)
- Draught 1.75 m (5.74 ft)
- Powerplant: 2 × Lyul'ka AL-7PB Axial flow turbojet, 71.2 kN (16,000 lbf) thrust each

Performance

- Maximum speed: 910 km/h (570 mph, 490 kn) at 5,000 m (16,400 ft)
- Range: 2,895 km (1,799 mi, 1,563 nmi)
- Service ceiling: 12,500 m (41,000 ft)
- Rate of climb: 10.288 m/s (2,025.2 ft/min)
- Time to altitude: 5,000 m (16,400 ft) in 8.1 minutes

Armament

- Guns: 4 × 23 mm (0.90 in) Afanasev Makarov AM-23 cannon. 2 forward firing, and 2 in a radar-controlled tail turret
- Missiles: Up to 3 RAT-52 torpedoes.
- Bombs: 12 × FAB-250 250 kg bombs or 1 FAB-3000 3,000 kg bomb.Anti-shipping mines.

== See also ==
Related development

- Beriev R-1
- Beriev A-40

Aircraft of comparable role, configuration, and era

- Martin P6M SeaMaster

Related lists

- List of flying boats and floatplanes
- List of military aircraft of the Soviet Union and the CIS
