= BE 12 =

BE 12 may refer to:

- Royal Aircraft Factory B.E.12, aircraft in World War I
- Beriev Be-12, aircraft in the Cold War
- Beryllium-12 (Be-12 or ^{12}Be), an isotope of beryllium
