= Dongan Engine Manufacturing Company =

Chinese engine manufacturer

The Dongan Engine Manufacturing Company is a Chinese engine manufacturer founded in 1948.

Also known as the Harbin Engine Factory it first produced the HS7 a 14-cylinder radial piston engine for the Z-5 helicopter.

== Engines ==
- Dongan HS7 1268 kW (1700 hp) 14-cylinder radial piston engine.
- Dongan HS8 1380 kW (1850 hp)
- Dongan WJ5A single shaft turboprop for the Xian Y-7 and Harbin SH-5
- Dongan WJ5E single shaft turboprop for the Xian Y7-200B developed with the help of General Electric
- Dongan R05E rotary engine developed for potential use in low altitude vehicles.
