= Harbin SH-5 =

Chinese maritime patrol flying boat

SH-5
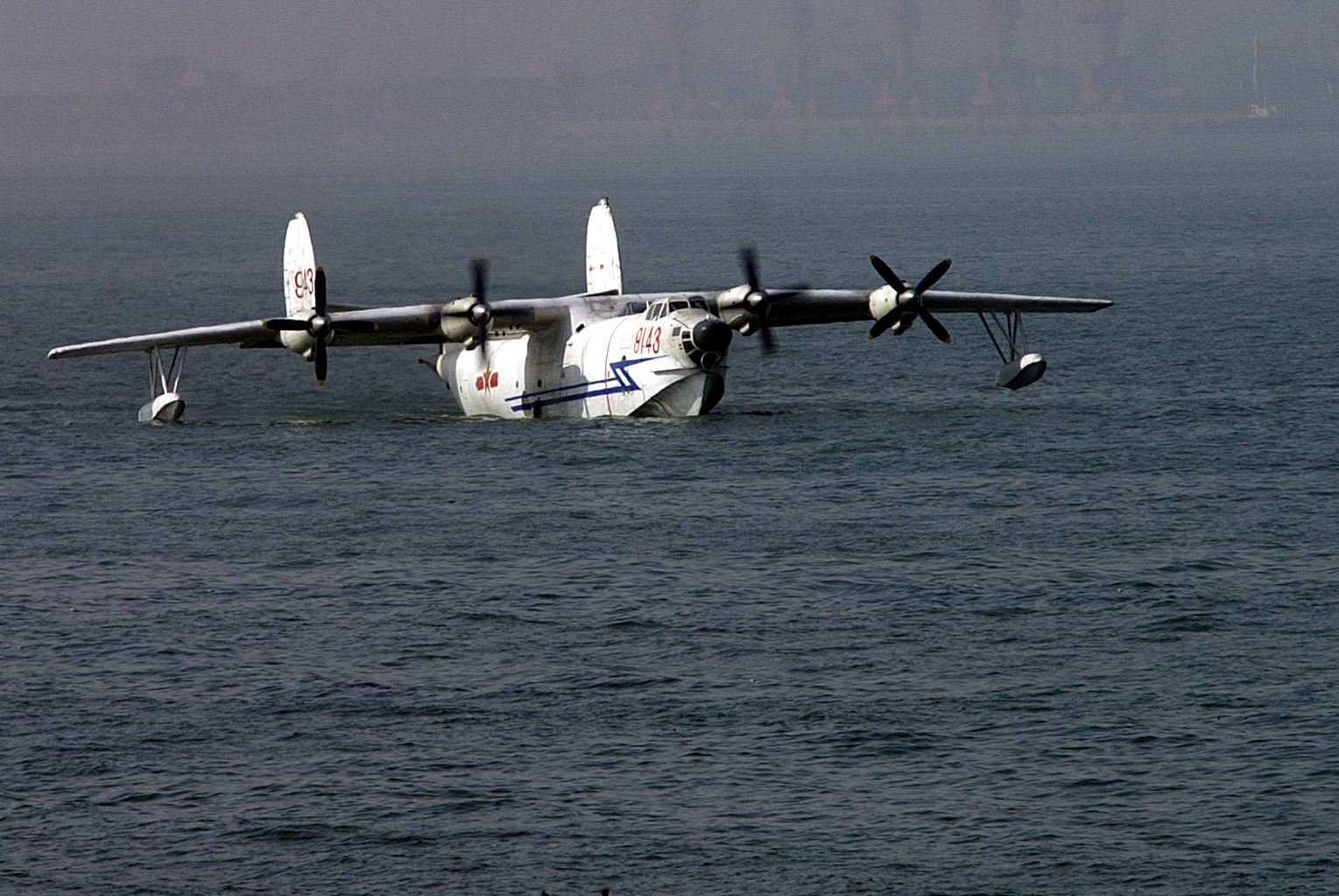

General information
- Type: Maritime patrol amphibian/air-sea rescue
- Manufacturer: Harbin Aircraft Factory
- Primary user: People's Liberation Army Naval Air Force
- Number built: 7

History
- Manufactured: 1984–1985
- Introduction date: 1986
- First flight: 3 April 1976

The Harbin SH-5 (Chinese: 水轰五型; pinyin: Shuǐhōng wǔxíng; lit. 'water bomb type 5', where "水轰" is short for 水上轰炸机; Shuǐshàng hōngzhàjī; 'seaborne bomber') is a Chinese maritime patrol amphibious aircraft intended for a wide range of duties, including aerial firefighting, anti-submarine warfare (ASW) and air-sea rescue (ASR). One prototype and six production aircraft have been built.

== Design and development ==
Research to build a seaplane capable of replacing Beriev Be-6s in service was initiated by the PLANAF in 1968, with designers reassigned from "Objective 3/17", a supersonic canard-wing fighter project. The first prototype flew in 1976; further units were delivered between 1986 and 1990.

== Variants ==
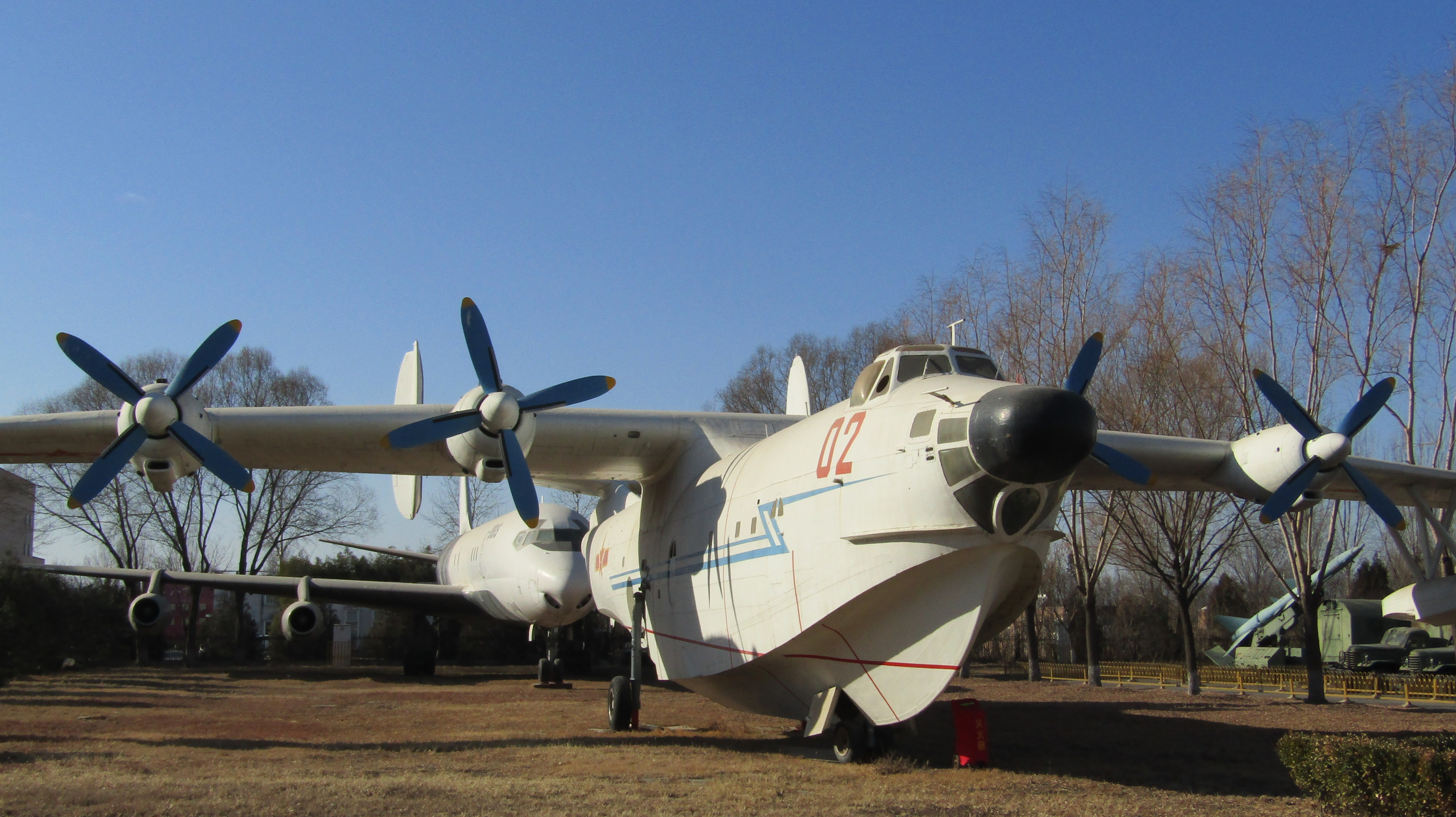
Harbin SH-5 on display at China Aviation Museum - Beijing, China

SH-5B Firefighter
One SH-5 was rebuilt for firefighting duties.

However, by a Chinese source, there were total of 7 SH-5 were produced: 3 SH-5X Prototype, 3 Maritime patrol aircraft, and 1 SH-B Firefighter.

== Operators ==
People's Republic of China

- People's Liberation Army Naval Air Force received 4 aircraft in 1986. All are operated by the People's Liberation Army Navy North Sea Fleet from an aircraft base near Qingdao, Shandong province.

== Specifications (SH-5) ==
Data from Jane's Aircraft Recognition Guide, Jane's All the World's Aircraft 1988-89

General characteristics

- Crew: 8
- Capacity: 10,000 kg (22,000 lb) maximum payload (cargo), 6,000 kg (13,000 lb) maximum weapons load
- Length: 38.9 m (127 ft 7 in)
- Wingspan: 36 m (118 ft 1 in)
- Height: 9.79 m (32 ft 1 in)
- Wing area: 144 m^{2} (1,550 sq ft)
- Empty weight: 25,000 kg (55,116 lb) SAR (Search And Rescue) and Transport

26,500 kg (58,400 lb) ASW (Anti-Submarine Warfare)

- Gross weight: 36,000 kg (79,366 lb)
- Max takeoff weight: 45,000 kg (99,208 lb)
- Fuel capacity: 16,500 kg (36,400 lb) max
- Powerplant: 4 × Dongan WJ5A turboprop engines, 2,350 kW (3,150 hp) each
- Propellers: 4-bladed constant speed reversible propellers, 3.8 m (12 ft 6 in) diameter

Performance

- Maximum speed: 560 km/h (350 mph, 300 kn)
- Cruise speed: 450 km/h (280 mph, 243 kn) maximum
- Min Patrol speed: 230 km/h (120 kn; 140 mph)
- Take-off speed (water): 160 km/h (86 kn; 99 mph)
- Landing speed (water): 92 km/h (50 kn; 57 mph)
- Range: 4,756 km (2,955 mi, 2,568 nmi) with maximum fuel
- Endurance: 15 hours on two engines
- Service ceiling: 10,250 m (33,630 ft) service ceiling
- Rate of climb: 9 m/s (1,800 ft/min)
- Wing loading: 250 kg/m^{2} (51 lb/sq ft) at 36,000 kg (79,000 lb)

312.5 kg/m^{2} (64 lb/sqft) at 45,000 kg (99,000 lb)

- Power/mass: 0.302 kW/kg (0.184 hp/lb) at 36,000 kg (79,000 lb)

0.242 kW/kg (0.147 hp/lb) at 45,000 kg (99,000 lb)

- Take-off run (water): 548 m (1,798 ft)
- Landing run (water): 240 m (790 ft)

Armament

- Hardpoints: 4 with a capacity of 6,000 kg (13,000 lb) of C-101 ASMs, ASW torpedoes, depth charges; mines; bombs

Avionics
Doppler search radar in nose radome; MAD (Magnetic Anomaly Detector) boom extending from the tail of the fuselage

== See also ==
- AVIC AG600

Aircraft of comparable role, configuration, and era

- Beriev Be-12
- Shin Meiwa US-1A
- ShinMaywa US-2
