= Beriev R-1 =

Soviet turbojet-powered flying boat

R-1
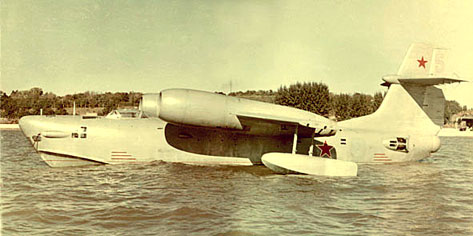

General information
- Type: Experimental flying boat
- National origin: Soviet Union
- Manufacturer: Beriev
- Status: scrapped
- Number built: 1

History
- First flight: 30 May 1952

The Beriev R-1 (known in-house as 'product R') was the first Soviet turbojet-powered flying boat.

== Design and development ==
At the end of World War II, design work began on a request from the Soviet Navy for a jet-powered flying boat. Starting with the wing design of the Be-6, Beriev began in-house design work in May 1947, even before the official specifications were issued in June 1948. The specifications called for a radar-equipped aircraft with a three-man crew, capable of a speed of 800 km/h, and with a range of 2000-2500 kilometers. The aircraft was to be armed with 2,000 kg of bombs and four 20 mm cannons.

Beriev completed a mock-up by 10 June 1950, using Klimov VK-1 engines instead of the originally planned Rolls-Royce Nene engines. The first prototype was completed in November 1951. However, the prototype experienced severe vibrations and hydrodynamic instability at 165 km/h and was nearly destroyed in testing. After much modification, flight testing began at the end of 1951. The prototype crash landed on 3 October 1953 and was again repaired.

Extensive testing continued to 1956, however, the development of land-based long-range reconnaissance aircraft put the project into jeopardy. After another crash in February 1956, the R-1 was never repaired and subsequently scrapped. The R designation is believed to have stood for Reaktivnyy (jet-propelled). Experience gained during the test programme with the R-1 was used in the development of the Beriev Be-10.

== Specifications (R-1) ==
Data from Beriev's Jet Flying Boats

General characteristics

- Crew: 3 (pilot, navigator and gunner/radio operator)
- Length: 19.9 m (65 ft 3 in)
- Wingspan: 20 m (65 ft 7 in)
- Height: 7.1 m (23 ft 4 in)
- Wing area: 58 m^{2} (620 sq ft)
- Airfoil: NACA 23009
- Max takeoff weight: 20,300 kg (44,754 lb)
- Powerplant: 2 × Klimov VK-1 turbojet engines, 26.5 kN (5,950 lbf) thrust each

Performance

- Maximum speed: 800 km/h (500 mph, 430 kn)
- Range: 2,000 km (1,200 mi, 1,100 nmi)
- Service ceiling: 11,500 m (37,700 ft)

Armament

- Guns: 2 forward-firing 23-mm Nudelman-Rikhter NR-23 cannon, 2 tail-mounted 23-mm Shpitalniy Sh-3 cannon.
- Bombs: Maximum of 1,000 kg (2,205 lb) carried on underwing bomb racks.

== See also ==
Related development

- Beriev Be-10

Related lists

- List of seaplanes and flying boats
