= Ukraine State Aviation Museum =

Oleg K. Antonov State Aviation Museum
- Державний музей авіації імені О. К. Антонова
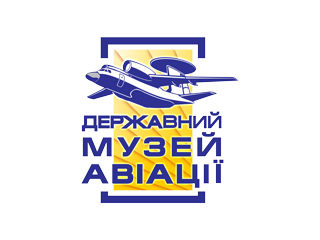

- Location within Ukraine
- Established: 30 September 2003
- Location: Kyiv, Ukraine
- Coordinates: 50.407222°N 30.459444°E
- Type: Aviation museum
- Curator: Yuriy Ziatdinov
- Public transit access: Bus route #220
- Website: www.aviamuseum.com.ua/en

The Oleg K. Antonov State Aviation Museum, known as Ukraine State Aviation Museum before 2018, is an aviation museum located next to Zhuliany Airport in Kyiv, Ukraine. Both the premises and the planes are provided by the National Aviation University which continues to use some of the aircraft as educational exhibits.

== History ==
The museum was established on 7 March 2001 by order of the Cabinet of Ministers of Ukraine. It opened in 2003 with 30 aircraft.

A heavily vandalized Ilyushin Il-28 was transported to the museum from Buialyk airfield in 2009.

The museum was named for Oleg K. Antonov in February 2018.

A prototype Kapway rubber-tired train was moved to the museum in July 2021. The museum began restoring an Il-28 in October 2021 and a Yak-40 in February 2022. The day before the Russian invasion of Ukraine, the museum had planned to relocate the sole surviving An-14 in Ukraine to its site. However, due to the war, the move was delayed until March 2023. Four months later, the museum received three An-28 fuselages from an airfield in Uzyn to be used as parts sources in its restoration.

The city of Kyiv announced that it would begin financially supporting the museum in December 2024. The museum received the wreckage of five Russian drones that had been shot down in Ukraine in July 2025.

The museum acquired an Antonov An-2P in late 2025 and announced it would be returning the aircraft to flight.

== Exhibits ==
Exhibits at the museum include a display about "space fever" in the 1950s and 60s.

== Collection ==
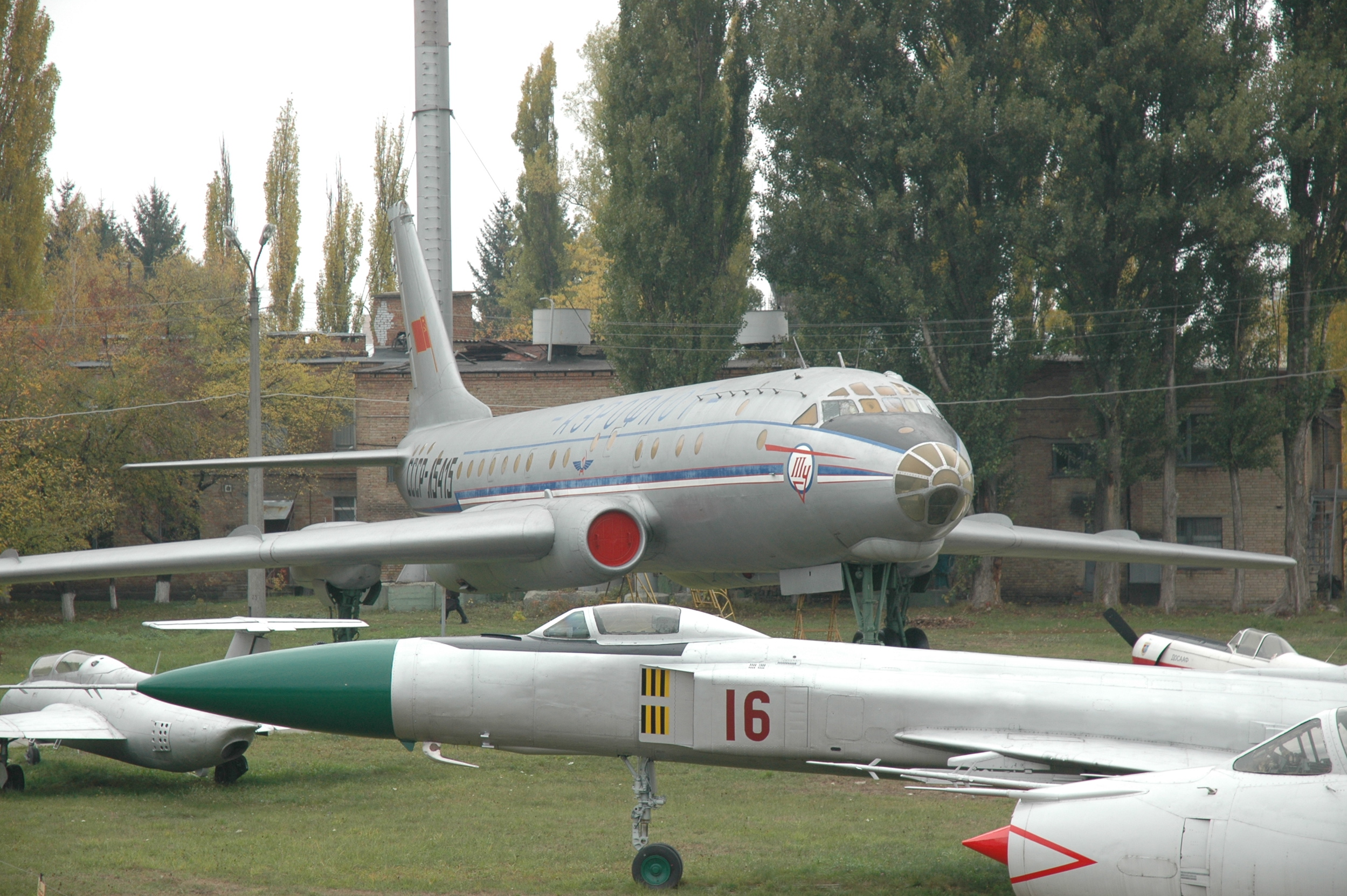
The museum grounds in 2009

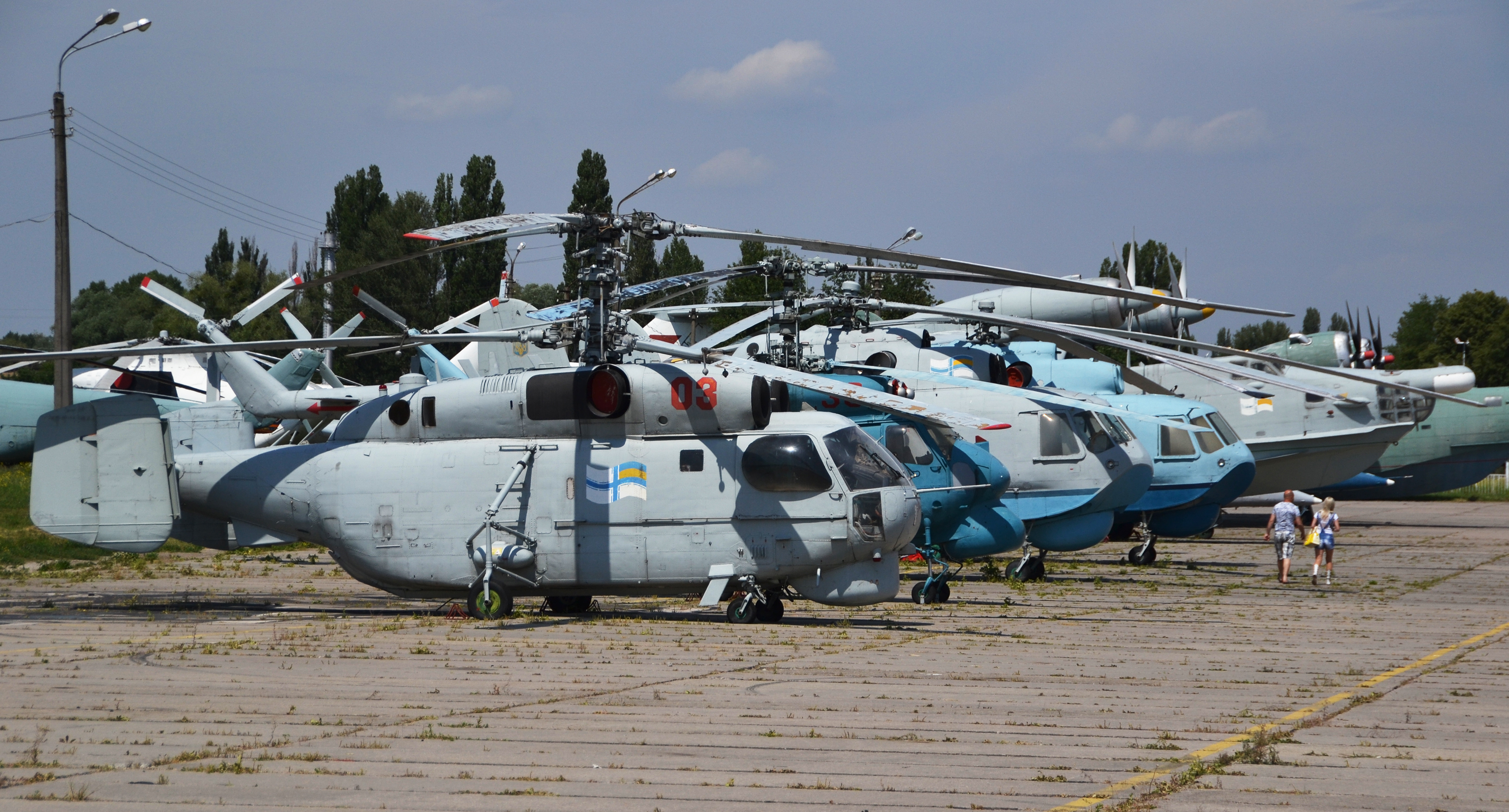
Kamov-helicopters at the museum in 2017

- Aero L-29 Delfin
- Aero L-39C Albatross
- Anatra DS Anasal – replica
- Antonov An-2
- Antonov An-24B
- Antonov An-24T
- Antonov An-26
- Antonov An-30
- Antonov An-71
- Antonov Izdelie 181
- Beriev Be-6
- Beriev Be-12
- Ilyushin Il-14G
- Ilyushin Il-18A
- Ilyushin Il-28
- Ilyushin Il-62
- Ilyushin Il-76
- Ilyushin Il-86
- Kamov Ka-25PL
- Kamov Ka-26
- Kamov Ka-27PL
- Mikoyan-Gurevich M21M
- Mikoyan-Gurevich MiG-15UTI
- Mikoyan-Gurevich MiG-17
- Mikoyan-Gurevich MiG-17F
- Mikoyan-Gurevich MiG-19PM
- Mikoyan-Gurevich MiG-21PF
- Mikoyan-Gurevich MiG-21PFM
- Mikoyan-Gurevich MiG-21UM
- Mikoyan-Gurevich MiG-23BM
- Mikoyan-Gurevich MiG-23ML
- Mikoyan-Gurevich MiG-25RB
- Mikoyan-Gurevich MiG-27K
- Mikoyan-Gurevich MiG-29
- Mikoyan-Gurevich MiG-29
- Mil Mi-1M
- Mil Mi-2
- Mil Mi-4
- Mil Mi-6A
- Mil Mi-8MT
- Mil Mi-8T
- Mil Mi-14BT
- Mil Mi-14PL
- Mil Mi-24A
- Mil Mi-24D
- Mil Mi-24P
- Mil Mi-24V
- Mil Mi-26
- PZL-Swidnik Mi-2
- Sukhoi Su-7BM
- Sukhoi Su-15TM
- Sukhoi Su-17M
- Sukhoi Su-17UM
- Sukhoi Su-20
- Sukhoi Su-24
- Sukhoi Su-25
- Tupolev Tu-22M0
- Tupolev Tu-22M2
- Tupolev Tu-22M3
- Tupolev Tu-104
- Tupolev Tu-134A
- Tupolev Tu-134A-3
- Tupolev Tu-134UBL
- Tupolev Tu-142M3
- Tupolev Tu-154
- Yakovlev Yak-18PM
- Yakovlev Yak-28U
- Yakovlev Yak-38
- Yakovlev Yak-40
- Yakovlev Yak-50 – Yak-3 replica

== Events ==
Old Car Fest retro car festival that was originally held in 2014 at the football stadium of KNUCA in 2015 was renamed to Old Car Land and moved to the Aviation Museum, since then it was held there annually twice a year before being forced to relocate due to the Russian invasion of Ukraine.

== See also ==
- Zhulyany Airport

Related lists

- List of aerospace museums
