= Beriev MBR-2 =

Soviet flying boat

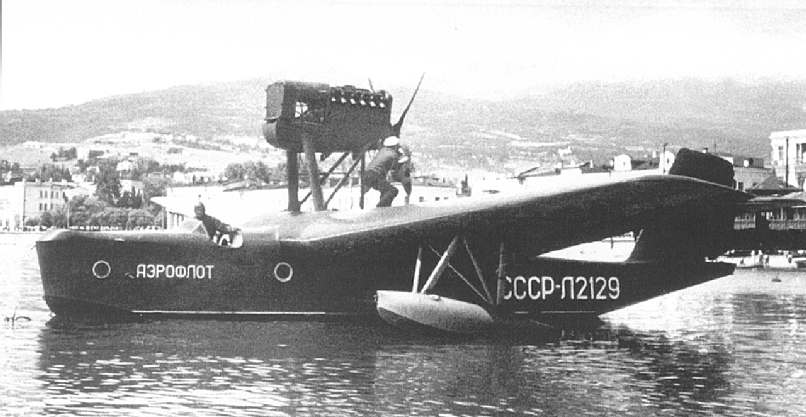
- Aeroflot MP-1 at Yalta, circa 1938.

General information
- Type: Patrol aircraft
- Manufacturer: Beriev OKB
- Designer: Georgy Mikhailovich Beriev
- Status: Out of production; retired
- Primary user: Soviet Navy
- Number built: 1,365

History
- Manufactured: 1934-1941
- Introduction date: 1935
- First flight: 1931

The Beriev MBR-2 was a Soviet multi-purpose (including reconnaissance) flying boat which entered service with the Soviet Navy in 1935. Out of 1,365 built, nine were used by foreign countries (including Finland and North Korea). In the Soviet Union, it sometimes carried the nickname of "Kорова" (cow) and "Амбар" (barn).

== Design ==
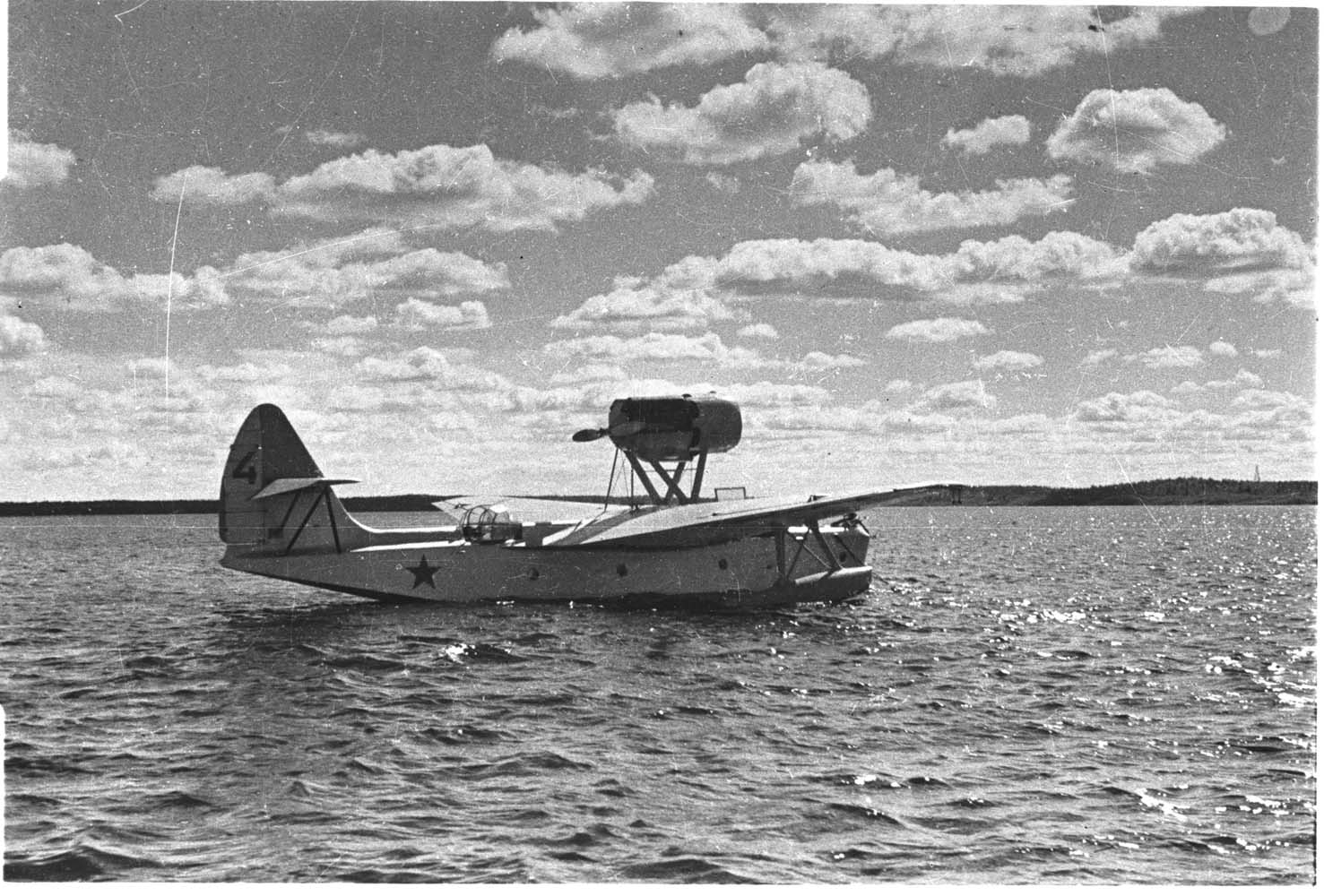
MBR-2 of the Air Force of the Northern Fleet at anchor in Kola Bay, 1942

A Beriev MBR-2AM-34 leaves on a combat mission near Sevastopol, May 1942

The MBR-2 was designed by Georgy Mikhailovich Beriev and first flew in 1931, powered by an imported 373 kW (500 hp) BMW VI.Z engine. Production models, which arrived in 1934, used a licence-built version of this engine, the Mikulin M-17 of 508 kW (680 hp), and could be fitted with a fixed wheel or ski undercarriage.

Beriev also designed a commercial airliner derivation, the MP-1, which entered airline service in 1934, and a freighter version, which followed in 1936.

In 1935, an improved version was developed, the MBR-2bis, powered by the Mikulin AM-34N engine, and fitted with an enclosed cockpit, dorsal gun-turret and enlarged vertical tail. In this configuration, the machine remained in production until 1941. As with the MBR-2, the bis spawned a commercial derivative and the MP-1bis entered service in 1937.

== Variants ==
- MBR-2M-17 : Short-range maritime reconnaissance, bombing flying-boat, powered by a 508 kW (680 hp) Mikulin M-17B piston engine.
- MBR-2AM-34 or MBR-2bis : Improved version, powered by a Mikulin AM-34N engine.
- MBR-2M-103 : One MBR-2AM-34 was fitted with the more powerful M-103 engine. One prototype only.
- MP-1 : Civil version of the MBR-2M-17 flying-boat. It could carry six passengers in an enclosed cabin.
- MP-1bis : Civil version of the MBR-2AM-34 flying-boat.
- MP-1T : Freight transport conversion of MBR-2.

== Operators ==
Finland

- The Finnish Air Force operated five captured aircraft from 1941.

Soviet Union

- Aeroflot
- Soviet Naval Aviation

North Korea

- North Korean Air Force

== Specifications (MBR-2 AM-34) ==
Data from L'hydroaviation MBR-2, pillier de la reconnaissance naval soviétique

General characteristics

- Crew: 4-5
- Length: 13.50 m (44 ft 3 in)
- Wingspan: 19.00 m (62 ft 4 in)
- Height: 5.00 m (16 ft 5 in)
- Wing area: 55 m^{2} (590 sq ft)
- Airfoil: root: MOS-27 (18%); tip: MOS-27 (10%)
- Empty weight: 2,718 kg (5,992 lb)
- Gross weight: 4,245 kg (9,359 lb)
- Powerplant: 1 × Mikulin AM-34NB V-12 liquid-cooled piston engine, 620 kW (830 hp)

Performance

- Maximum speed: 275 km/h (171 mph, 148 kn) at 5,000 m (16,000 ft)
- Cruise speed: 190 km/h (120 mph, 100 kn)
- Range: 1,600 km (990 mi, 860 nmi)
- Service ceiling: 6,000 m (20,000 ft)

Armament

- Guns:
  - 1× 7.62 mm (0.30 in) PV-1 machine gun in bow
  - 1× 7.62 mm ShKAS machine gun in dorsal turret
- Bombs:

- 300 kg (660 lb) of bombs, mines, and depth charges carried underwing

== See also ==
Aircraft of comparable role, configuration, and era

- Supermarine Walrus
- Loire 130

Related lists

- List of interwar military aircraft
- List of aircraft of World War II

== Bibliography ==
- Green, William (1968). War Planes of the Second World War, Volume Five, Flying Boats. London: Macdonald & Co. (Publishers) Ltd. ISBN 0-356-01449-5.
- Kulikov, Victor (September 1998). "L'hydroaviation MBR-2, pillier de la reconnaissance naval soviétique" [The Seaplane MBR-2, Pillar of Soviet Naval Reconnaissance]. Avions: Toute l'aéronautique et son histoire (in French). No. 66. pp. 22–29. ISSN 1243-8650.
- Munson, Kenneth (1969). Bombers, Patrol and Transport Aircraft 1939-45. Blandford. ISBN 0-7137-0379-2.
