= Uspekh =

Uspekh Успех
- Settlement
- Location within Astrakhan Oblast Location within Russia
- Coordinates: 46°04′N 48°02′E
- Country: Russia
- Region: Astrakhan Oblast
- District: Kamyzyaksky District
- Time zone: UTC+4:00

Uspekh (Russian: Успех) is a rural locality (a settlement) in Kamyzyaksky District, Astrakhan Oblast, Russia. The population was 185 as of 2010. There are 3 streets.

== Geography ==
Uspekh is located 12 km southwest of Kamyzyak (the district's administrative centre) by road. Uvary is the nearest rural locality.
