= Yakovlev Yak-44 =

Proposed airborne early warning aircraft

Yak-44

General information
- Type: Carrier-based airborne early warning and control
- Manufacturer: Yakovlev
- Status: Cancelled before prototype construction

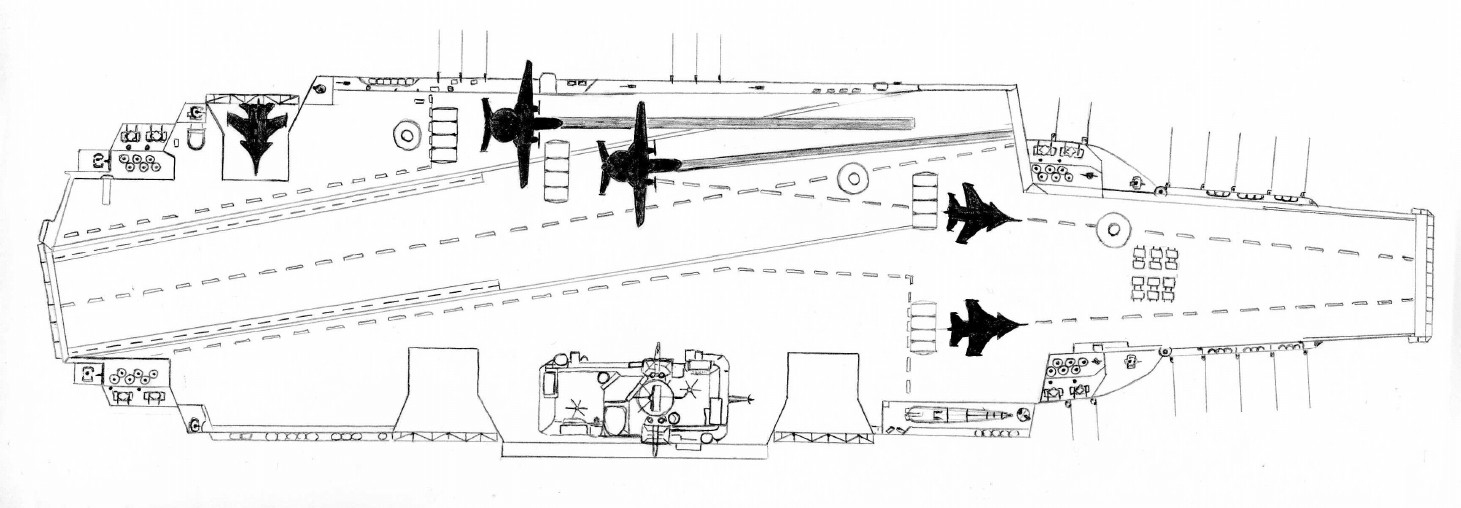
Yak-44 and Su-33 on the deck of Ulyanovsk.

The Yakovlev Yak-44 (Russian: Як-44) was a proposed twin-turboprop Airborne Early Warning (AEW) aircraft, resembling the United States Navy's E-2 Hawkeye, intended for use with the Soviet Navy's Ulyanovsk class supercarriers. Along with the aircraft carrier it would have flown from, the Yak-44 was cancelled after the demise of the Soviet Union. A full-scale mockup with foldable wings was built.

== Design and development ==
In the late 1970s, the Soviet Navy adopted a plan to build large aircraft carriers capable of operating conventional aircraft rather than the VSTOL Yakovlev Yak-38s operated by the existing Kiev class aircraft carriers. These new carriers required a shipborne airborne early warning (AEW) aircraft to be effective, and the Yakovlev design bureau was instructed to develop such an aircraft in 1979. While the AEW would be the primary role for the aircraft, it was also planned to develop versions to serve in the anti-submarine warfare (ASW) and carrier on-board delivery (COD) roles.

The basic layout and size of the final Yak-44E design was similar to that of the Grumman E-2C which operated in the same role from American aircraft carriers, being a twin-engined high-wing monoplane with a rotating radar dome (rotodome) above the aircraft's fuselage. The Yak-44 was designed to carry much more fuel, and was therefore far heavier. The engines were to be two Progress D-27 propfans rated at 14,000 ehp (10,290 kW) each, driving contra-rotating propellers. The crew of five were to be accommodated in a pressurized fuselage, while the aircraft's rotodome, carrying a NPO Vega pulse-doppler radar could be retracted to reduce the aircraft's height when stowed below decks in the carrier's hangar. The aircraft's wings also folded upwards, while a twin tail was fitted.

The aircraft was stressed to allow catapult launching and arrested landings, but was also capable of operating from the ski-jump ramps of the Project 1143.5 carriers (later to become known as the Admiral Kuznetsov class).

A detailed full-size mockup was completed in 1991, and approved with minor changes by the Soviet Naval Aviation (A-VMF). The collapse of the Soviet Union in 1991 resulted in the program being delayed, with the catapult-equipped Ulyanovsk being cancelled and scrapped, and the second Admiral Kuznetsov class carrier, the Varyag, being left incomplete. The Yak-44 program was abandoned by the Russian Navy in 1993.

== Specifications (Yak-44E) ==
Data from Yakovlev Aircraft since 1924

General characteristics

- Crew: 5
- Length: 20.39 m (66 ft 11 in)
- Wingspan: 25.7 m (84 ft 4 in)
- Height: 7 m (23 ft 0 in)
- Max takeoff weight: 40,000 kg (88,185 lb)
- Powerplant: 2 × Progress D-27 propfan, 10,290 kW (13,800 hp) each
- Propellers: 14-bladed SPE Aerosila SV-27

Performance

- Maximum speed: 740 km/h (460 mph, 400 kn)
- Range: 4,000 km (2,500 mi, 2,200 nmi)
- Service ceiling: 13,000 m (43,000 ft)

== See also ==
- Antonov An-71
- Antonov An-75 - proposed carrier compatible version of the AN-71

Aircraft of comparable role, configuration, and era

- Grumman E-2 Hawkeye
