= Dongan WJ-5 =

WJ-5
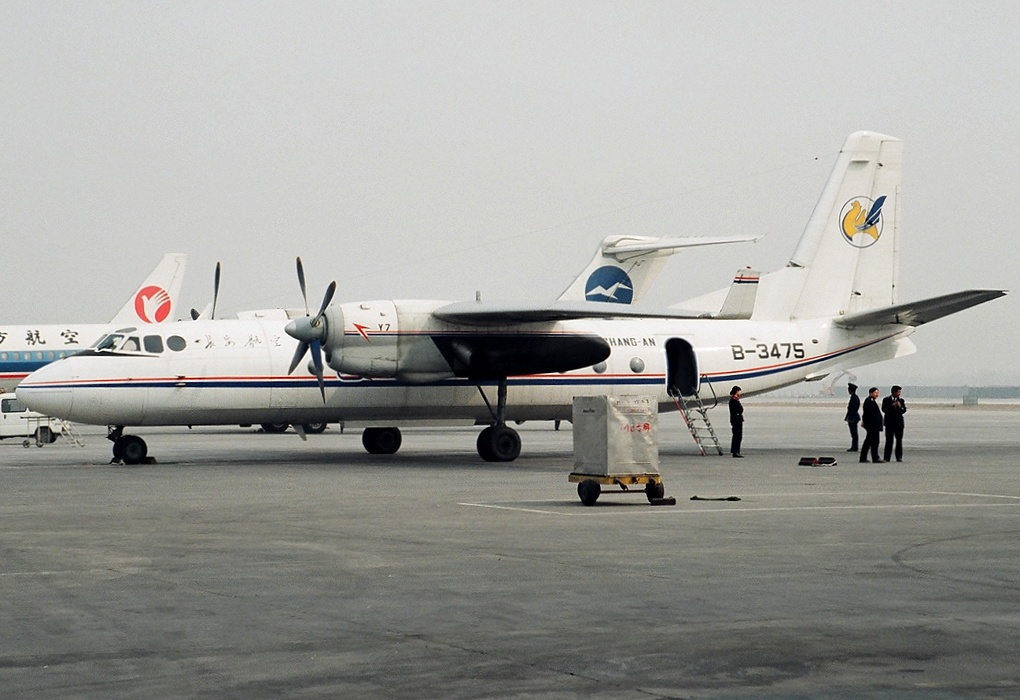
- A Xian Y-7-100 powered by Dongan WJ-5 turboprop engines
- Type: Single-shaft Turboprop
- National origin: China
- Manufacturer: Dongan Engine Manufacturing Company
- Major applications: Xian Y-7

The Dongan WJ-5 is a Chinese single-shaft turboprop aero engine built by the Dongan Engine Manufacturing Company for the Xian Y-7 twin-engined transport.

== Variants ==
WJ-5A
Main production variant of 2162 ekW (2900 ehp)
WJ-5E
Improved variant for the Xian Y-7-200 sometimes referred to as the WJ-5A-1G. Developed with the help of General Electric
WZ-5
A turboshaft version of the WJ-5, which failed to progress beyond the prototype stage.

== Application ==
- Harbin SH-5
- Xian Y-7
