= Antonov An-71 =

Soviet airborne early warning aircraft

An-71
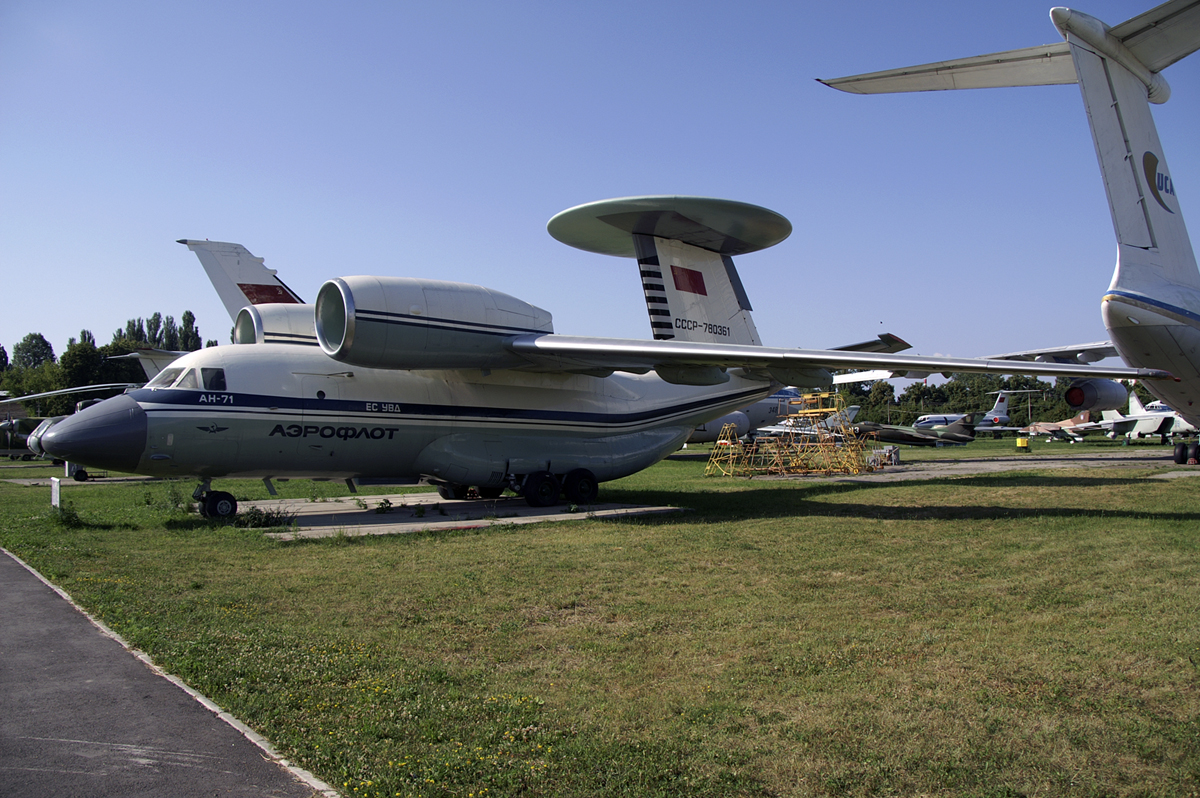
- Antonov An-71 at the Ukraine State Aviation Museum

General information
- Type: Tactical AWACS
- Manufacturer: Antonov
- Status: Cancelled
- Primary user: Soviet Air Force (intended) Aeroflot
- Number built: 3

History
- First flight: 12 July 1985
- Developed from: Antonov An-72

The Antonov An-71 (NATO reporting name: Madcap) is a Soviet AWACS aircraft intended for use with VVS-FA (Fighter Bomber) forces of the Soviet Air Force, developed from the An-72 transport. Only three prototypes were built before the program was cancelled.

== Background ==
=== Soviet Air Force AWACS doctrine ===
Prior to the fall of the Soviet Union, the Air Force was divided into three aircraft based groups of units. They were the VVS-DA (Voenno-Vozdushnye Sily Dal'naya Aviatsiya) or Long Range Aviation (Bombers), the VVS-FA (Voenno-Vozdushnye Sily Frontovaya Aviatsiya) or Frontal Aviation (Fighters, Fighter Bombers and Attack aircraft), and the VVS-VTA (Voenno-Vozdushnye Sily Voenno-Transportnaya Aviatsiya) or Military Transport Aviation. The PVO (Voyska protivovozdushnoy oborony or Voyska PVO) which was the primary fighter / interceptor and surface-based defensive force was not part of the VVS; as a result, the A-50 Mainstay AWACS aircraft and its predecessor the Tu-126 Moss served exclusively with the Voyska PVO and did not assist in the direction of tactical aircraft. The An-71 was designed to be used overland to support the VVS-FA in tactical operations. This doctrine of each force having its own AWACS planes is contrary to most Western air forces' use of land based AWACS aircraft; this doctrinal difference lead in part to the fallacy that the An-71 was designed to be used by the Soviet Navy on its aircraft carriers.

== Development ==
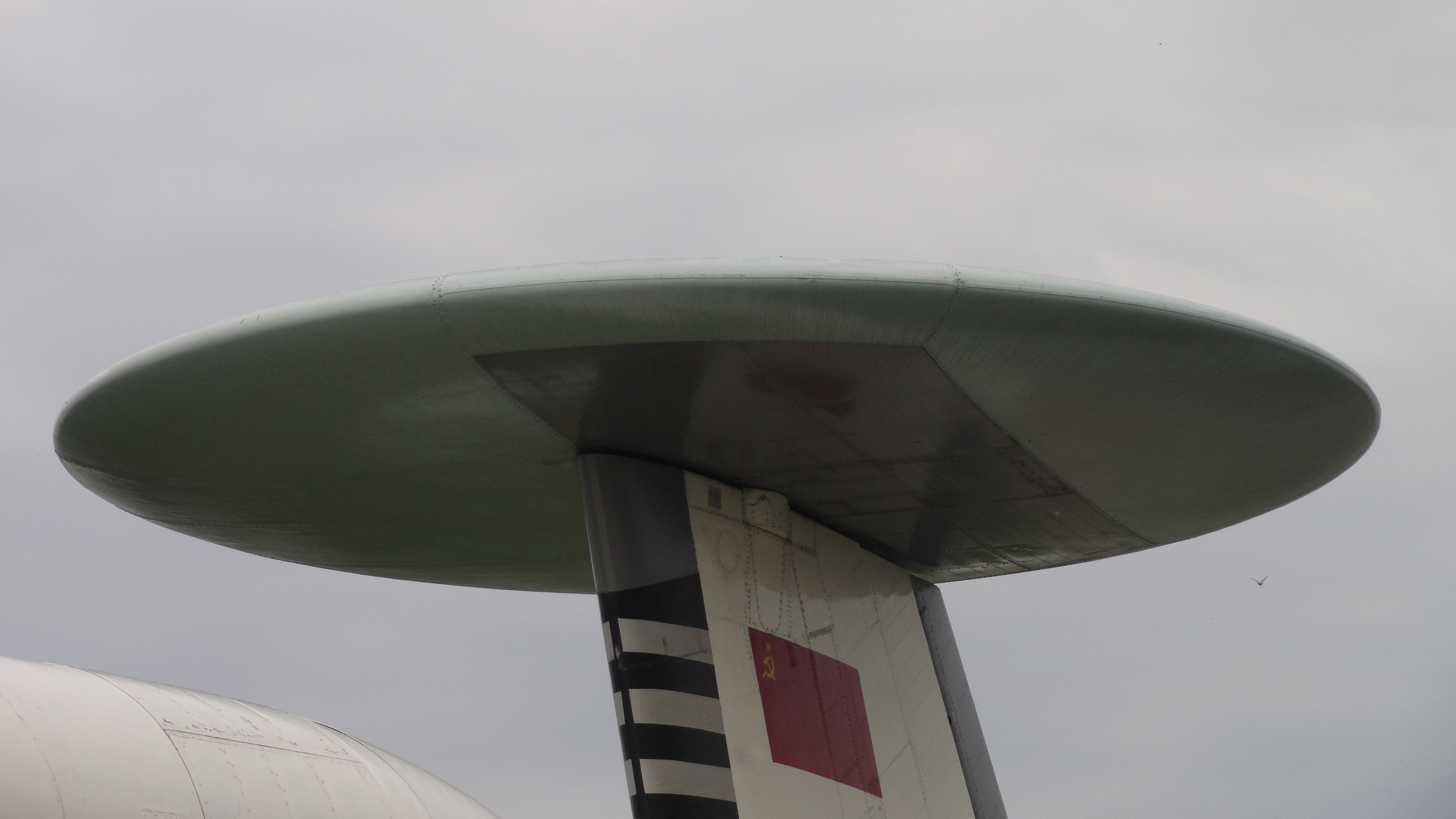
An-71 rotodome

Its design was based on An-72, with a completely redesigned rear fuselage supporting the radar dome (rotodome) atop the broad-chord forward-swept fin. The cargo hold contained the electronic equipment and six operators stations.

Development never progressed past the prototype stage, the first of which flew on 12 July 1985. The program was cancelled with the fall of the Soviet Union when issues with the radar Vega-M Kvant could not be resolved.

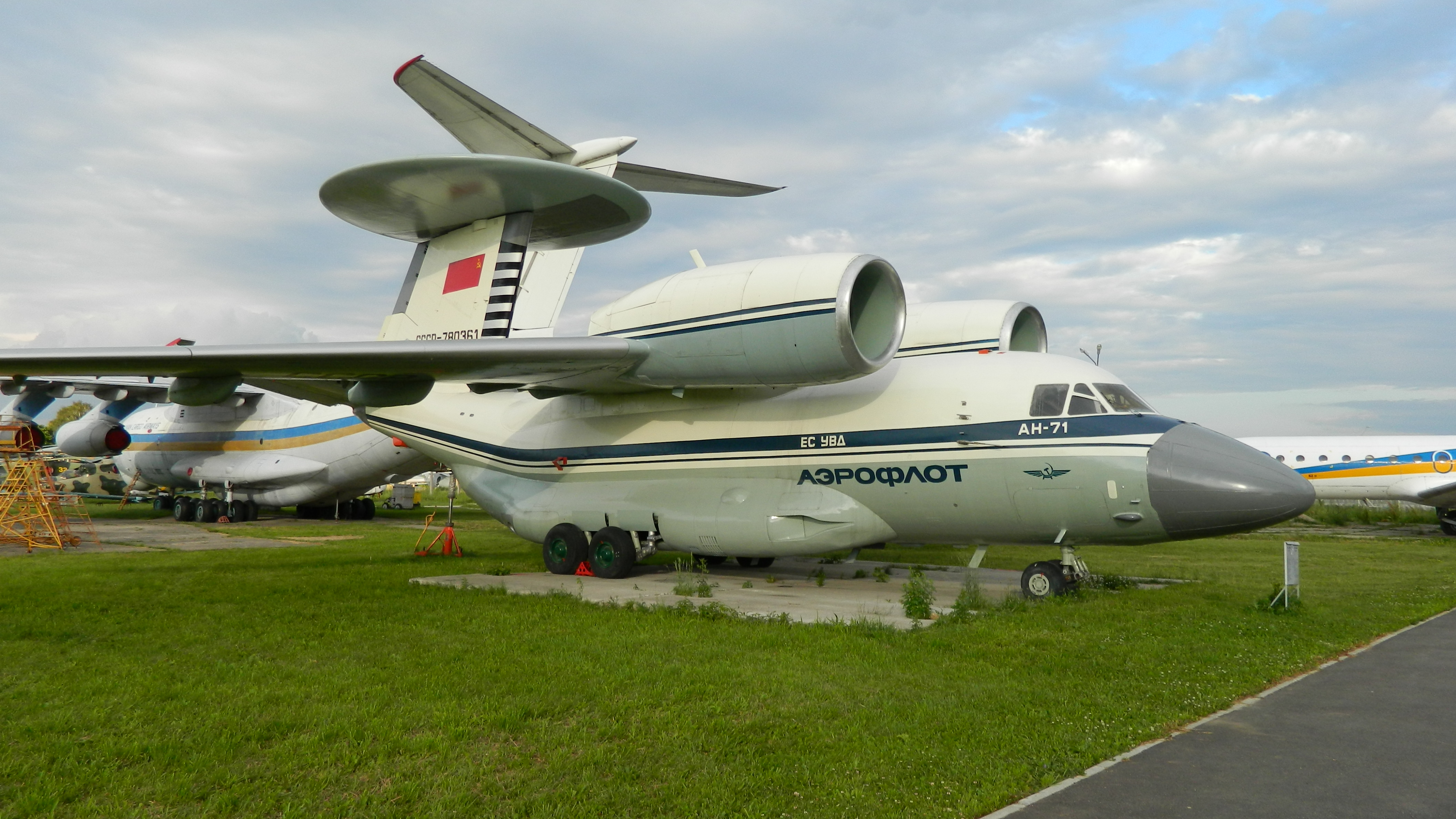
An-71 at the Ukraine State Aviation Museum

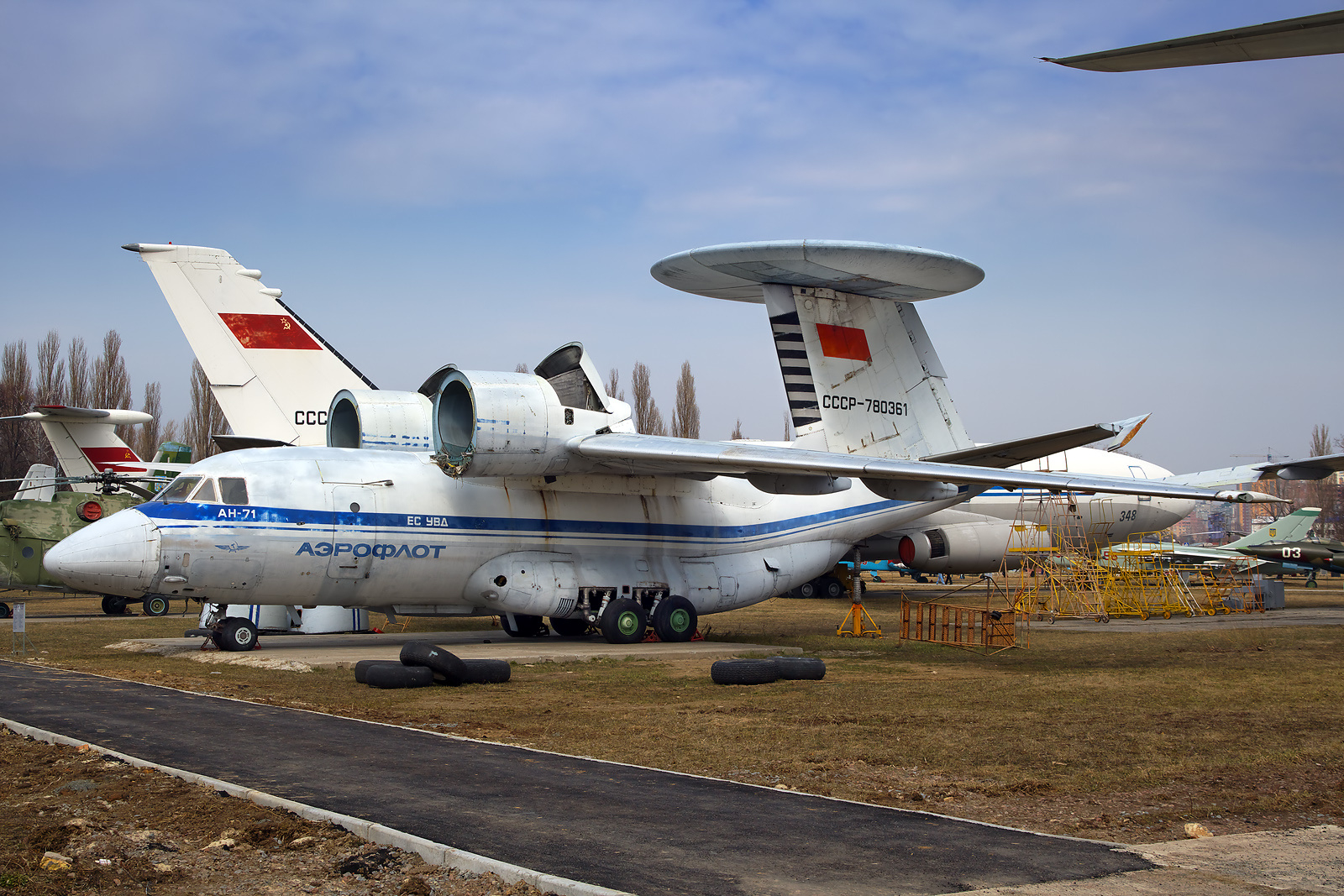
An-71 at the Ukraine State Aviation Museum

In 2010, one example was transferred to the Ukraine State Aviation Museum for restoration and display.

=== Carrier-based variant ===
The An-71 Madcap is often erroneously cited as a carrier-based AWACS aircraft, which it was not, as is already described above under AWACS doctrine. However, a highly modified design, the An-75, was proposed for use on the Soviet aircraft carriers under construction, but the AV-MF (Soviet Naval Aviation) cancelled its development when it was realized that too much of a redesign would be needed to make the An-75 safe to operate off any of the proposed aircraft carriers. The AV-MF decided to seek a second purpose-built AWACS proposal using an improved Kvant-M version of the existing An-71/An-75's Kvant Radar by the Vega-M design bureau. The An-75 would have had engines mounted under the wing rather than above, similar to the later An-74TK-300, and would have had many other structural and aerodynamic changes. In the end, the An-75 would have shared only slight commonality with the An-71/An-72 aircraft families and was deemed too costly to continue, considering the clean-sheet design of the Yak-44E.

=== Export ===
In the early 2000s, Ukraine unsuccessfully negotiated with India on the sale of an An-71, priced at US$200 million. The An-71 would have had the capability to detect 400 targets at ranges of up to 370 kilometres (230 mi).

== Operators ==
Soviet Union

- Soviet Air Force
- Aeroflot

== Specifications (An-71) ==
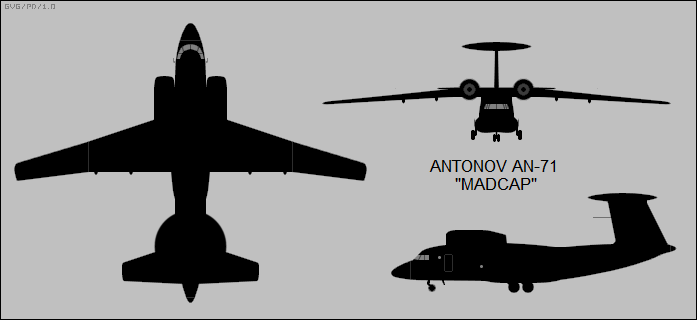
Three view diagram of An-71

Data from

General characteristics

- Crew: 6
- Length: 23.5 m (77 ft 1 in)
- Wingspan: 31.89 m (104 ft 8 in)
- Height: 9.2 m (30 ft 2 in)
- Empty weight: 19,760 kg (43,563 lb)
- Max takeoff weight: 32,100 kg (70,768 lb)
- Powerplant: 2 × Progress D-436K turbofan engines

Performance

- Maximum speed: 650 km/h (400 mph, 350 kn)
- Cruise speed: 530 km/h (330 mph, 290 kn)
- Service ceiling: 10,800 m (35,400 ft)

Avionics

- Vega-M Kvant search radar

== See also ==
Related development

- Antonov An-72
- Antonov An-74
- Antonov An-148
- Antonov An-178

Aircraft of comparable role, configuration, and era

- E-2 Hawkeye
- Yakovlev Yak-44
