= Beriev Be-12 =

Patrol aircraft

Be-12 Chayka
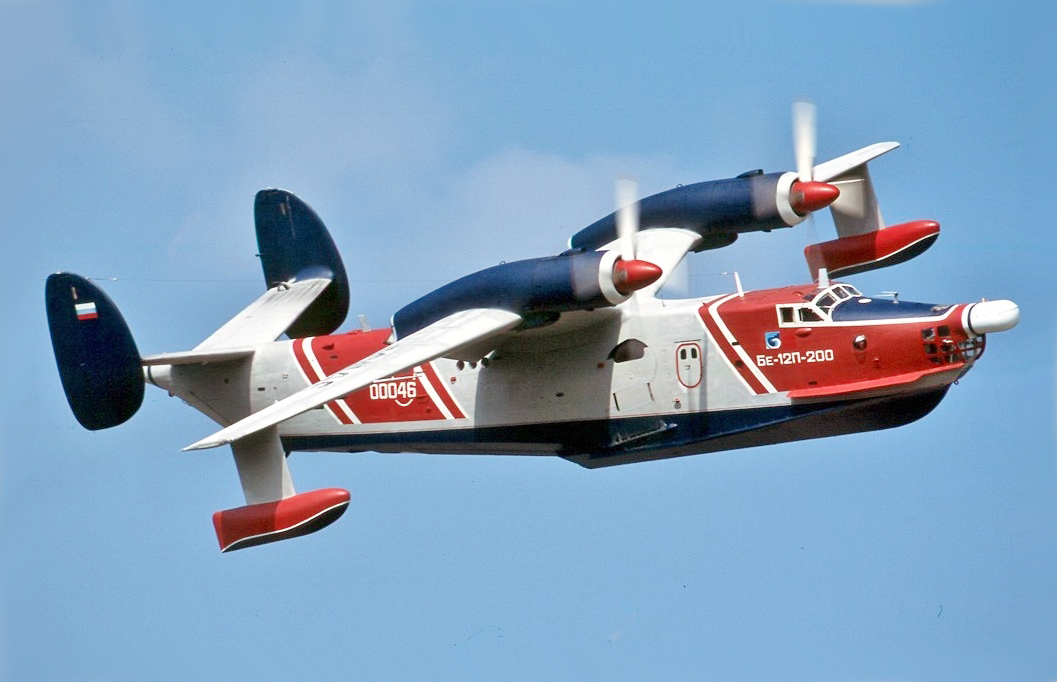
- Be-12P-200 at Gelendzhik in September 2004

General information
- Type: Maritime patrol aircraft
- Manufacturer: Beriev OKB
- Status: Operational (in small numbers)
- Primary user: Soviet Naval Aviation
- Number built: 150

History
- Manufactured: 1960 — 1973
- Introduction date: 1960s
- First flight: 18 October 1960
- Developed from: Beriev Be-6

The Beriev Be-12 Chayka (Russian: Бериев Бе-12 Чайка, romanized: Chayka, lit. 'gull', NATO reporting name: Mail) is a Soviet turboprop-powered amphibious aircraft designed in the 1950s for anti-submarine and maritime patrol duties.

== Design and development ==
The Beriev Be-12 was a successor to the Beriev Be-6 flying boat, whose primary roles were as an anti-submarine and maritime patrol bomber aircraft. Though tracing its origins to the Be-6, the Be-12 inherited little more than the gull wing and twin oval tailfin configuration of the older aircraft. The Be-12 has turboprop engines, which gave it an improved speed and range over the Be-6. The Be-12 also had retractable landing gear, which enabled it to land on normal land runways, as well as water.

The Be-12 was first flown on October 18, 1960, at Taganrog airfield, and made its first public appearance at the 1961 Soviet Aviation Day festivities at Tushino airfield. A total of 150 aircraft were produced, in several variations, with production ending in 1973.

== Operational history ==
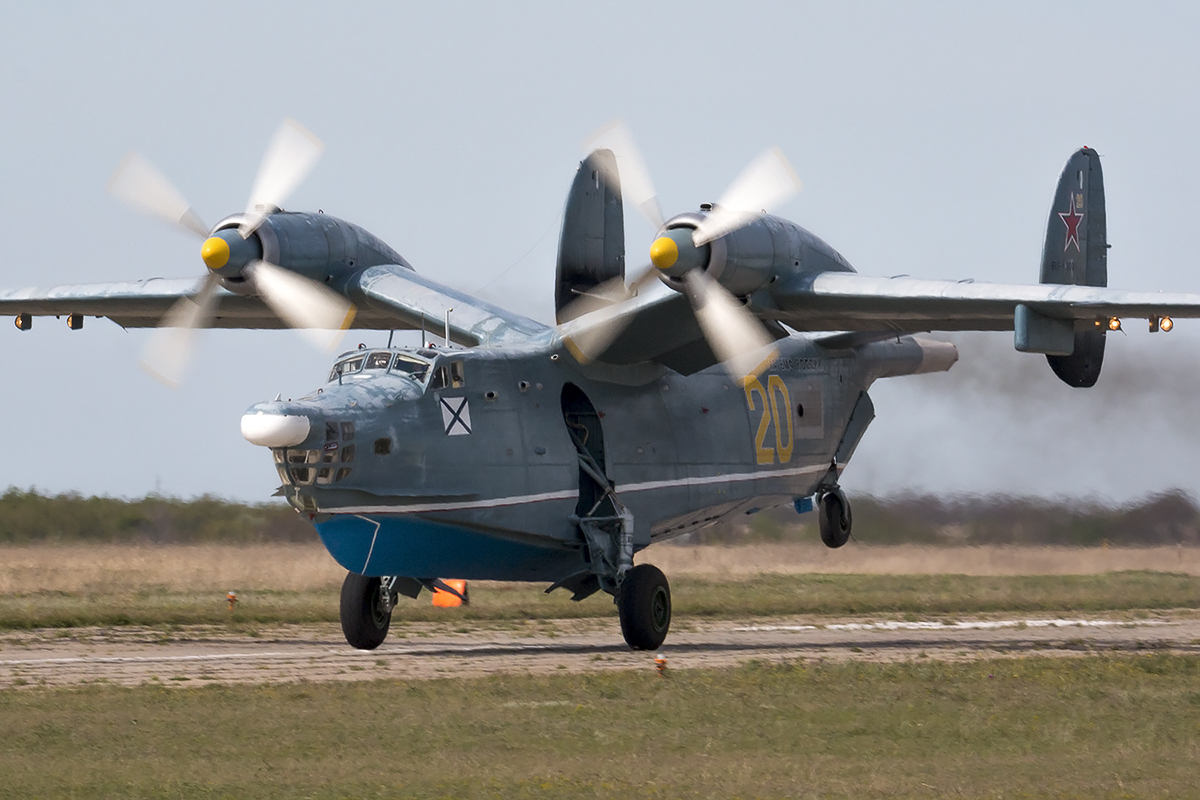
A Be-12 during take-off roll

The Be-12 entered service with Soviet Naval Aviation, or AV-MF (Aviatcia Voenno-Morskogo Flota), in the early 1960s in the maritime patrol role, and is one of the few amphibious aircraft still in military service in the world. Initially its role was ASW patrol, but when newer missiles enabled United States Navy submarines to launch from further offshore it was converted to the search and rescue role (Be-12PS). A few are still in service.

After the dissolution of the Soviet Union, some aircraft were converted to water bombers for the suppression of forest fires. During development of the Beriev Be-200, unique fire-fighting equipment was tested using a specially modified Be-12P, code-named "12 Yellow". After installation of the fire-fighting system, the aircraft was registered as RA-00046 and given the designation Be-12P-200. This modified Be-12 was also used to trial firefighting operations envisaged for the Be-200.

According to figures released in 1993, the Russian Navy had 55 aircraft in service. By 2005 this had dropped to 12, and to nine by 2008. A surviving Be-12 is preserved at the Central Air Force Museum at Monino, outside of Moscow. There are other examples at the Ukraine State Aviation Museum at Kyiv, Ukraine and at the Taganrog Air Museum, in southern Russia. It has been reported that the planes have been conducting patrols along and around the Crimean coast during the Russo-Ukrainian war. This includes searching for Ukrainian Unmanned surface vehicles.

On 21 September 2025, the Ukrainian HUR claimed that it had destroyed Russian Be-12 Chayka amphibious aircraft for the first time, attacking two in Crimea. The serviceability of the craft targeted is unclear with one of them appearing to be missing its propellers.

Russia has been using Be-12 in combat on the Black Sea during the Russo-Ukrainian war.

== Variants ==
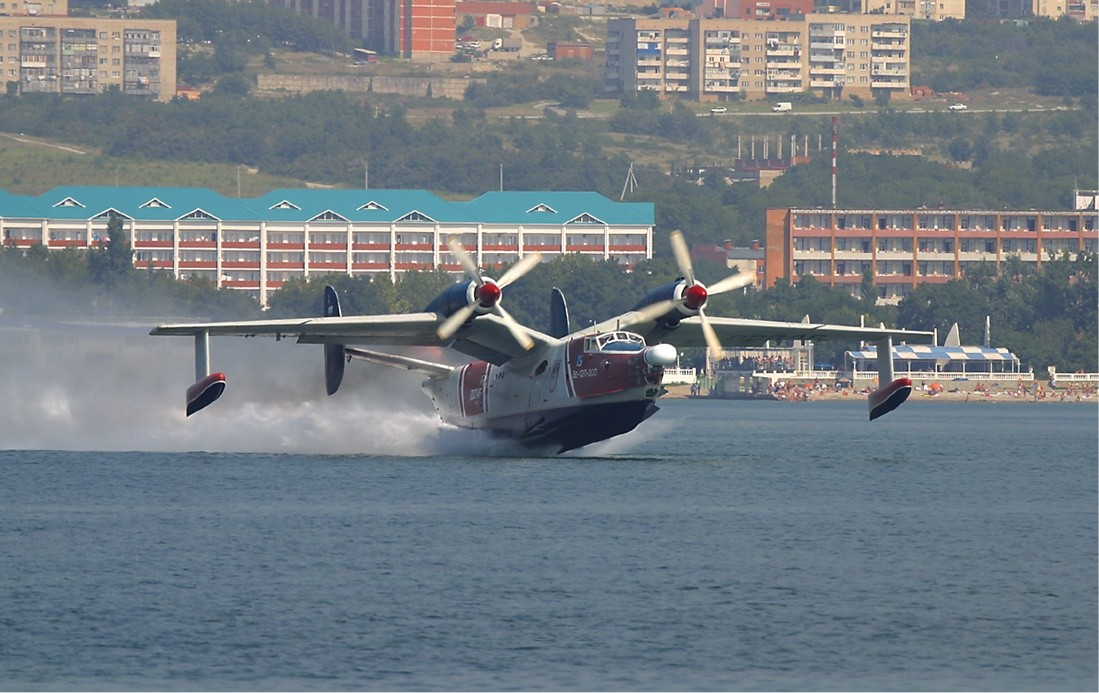
Be-12 during take-off on water

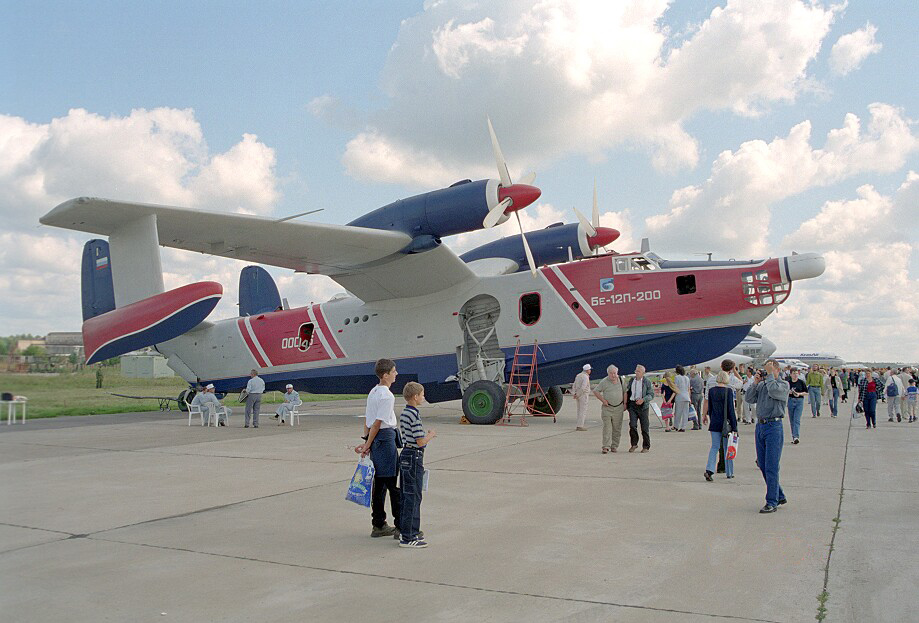
Be-12P-200 technology demonstrator

Be-12
Twin-engined maritime reconnaissance, anti-submarine warfare flying-boat. 2 prototypes and 130 production airframes built.
Be-12EKO
Projected ecological reconnaissance version. Not built.
Be-12I
Projected scientific research version designed in 1991. Not built.
Be-12LL
Conversion for testing the 3M-80 'Moskit' anti-shipping missile. Nose radar replaced with missile seeker head. One aircraft converted in 1980.
Be-12N
ASW version fitted with new sensors, avionics, MAD sensor and Nartsiss search/attack system. 27 aircraft converted.
Be-12Nkh
Utility transport, experimental passenger transport version. Military equipment removed, additional windows fitted. 2 built, both converted from Be-12.
Be-12P
Firefighting version. One 4,500 L tank and two 750 L tanks installed. Four aircraft converted in 1992.
Be-12P-200
Technology demonstrator for the Beriev Be-200. Fire-fighting configuration. One aircraft converted.
Be-12PS
Maritime Search and rescue version. Life rafts and survival equipment carried. 6 crew. 10 built new, 4 converted from Be-12.
Be-12SK
One aircraft converted in 1961 for use in SK-1 nuclear depth charge tests.
Be-14
All weather, day/night SAR version. Additional SAR and medical equipment. 6 crew. AI-20D engines. One built.
M-12
Stripped-down Be-12 used for record-setting flights. 2 Crew. Later returned to standard configuration.

== Operators ==
=== Current operators ===
Russia

- Russian Naval Aviation – received ex-Soviet Union aircraft. Between two and seven Aircraft still in operation with the Black Sea Fleet.

Ukraine

- Ukrainian Naval Aviation – received ex-Soviet aircraft, two still in operation of 10th Naval Aviation Brigade.

=== Former operators ===
Azerbaijan

- Azerbaijani Air Forces – inherited three aircraft from the Soviet Union. They were decommissioned around 2000, and scrapped in 2018.

Egypt

- Egyptian Air Force – operated two or three Be-12s circa 1970, crewed by Soviet personnel, to maintain surveillance on the United States Navy's 6th Fleet in the Mediterranean.

Soviet Union

- Soviet Naval Aviation – passed its aircraft to successor countries: Russia, Ukraine and Azerbaijan.

Syria

- Syrian Air Force

Vietnam

- Vietnam People's Air Force – four aircraft in 1981.

== Specifications (Be-12) ==
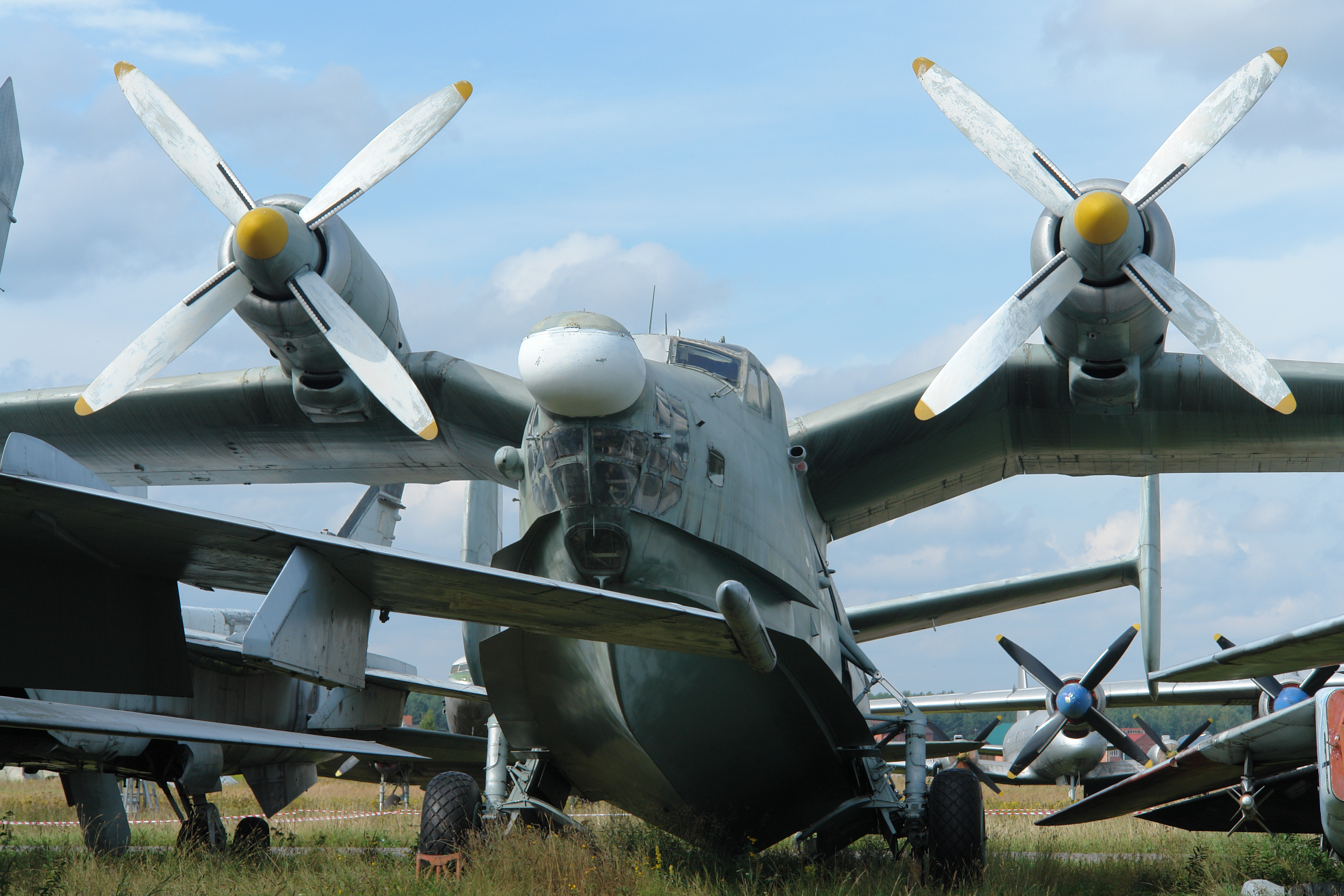
Be-12 at Monino Central Air Force Museum in Moscow, 2006

Data from

General characteristics

- Crew: 4
- Length: 30.11 m (98 ft 9 in)
- Wingspan: 29.84 m (97 ft 11 in)
- Height: 7.94 m (26 ft 1 in)
- Wing area: 99 m^{2} (1,070 sq ft)
- Empty weight: 24,000 kg (52,911 lb)
- Gross weight: 29,500 kg (65,036 lb)
- Max takeoff weight: 36,000 kg (79,366 lb)
- Powerplant: 2 × Ivchenko Progress AI-20D turboprop engines, 3,964 kW (5,316 hp) each
- Propellers: 4-bladed constant-speed propellers

Performance

- Maximum speed: 530 km/h (330 mph, 290 kn)
- Range: 3,300 km (2,100 mi, 1,800 nmi)
- Service ceiling: 8,000 m (26,000 ft)
- Wing loading: 298 kg/m^{2} (61 lb/sq ft)
- Power/mass: 0.260 kW/kg (0.158 hp/lb)

== See also ==
Related development

- Beriev Be-6

Aircraft of comparable role, configuration, and era

- Canadair CL-415
- Harbin SH-5
- Martin P5M Marlin
- Martin PBM Mariner
- ShinMaywa US-1

Related lists

- List of military aircraft of the Soviet Union and the CIS
- List of flying boats and floatplanes
