= HAMC =

HAMC may refer to:

- Harbin Aircraft Manufacturing Corporation, an aircraft manufacturer
- Hells Angels Motorcycle Corporation, or Club, a one-percenter outlaw motorcycle club (MC)
- High and Mighty Color, a Japanese rock band
