= Harbin Y-12 =

Utility transport aircraft

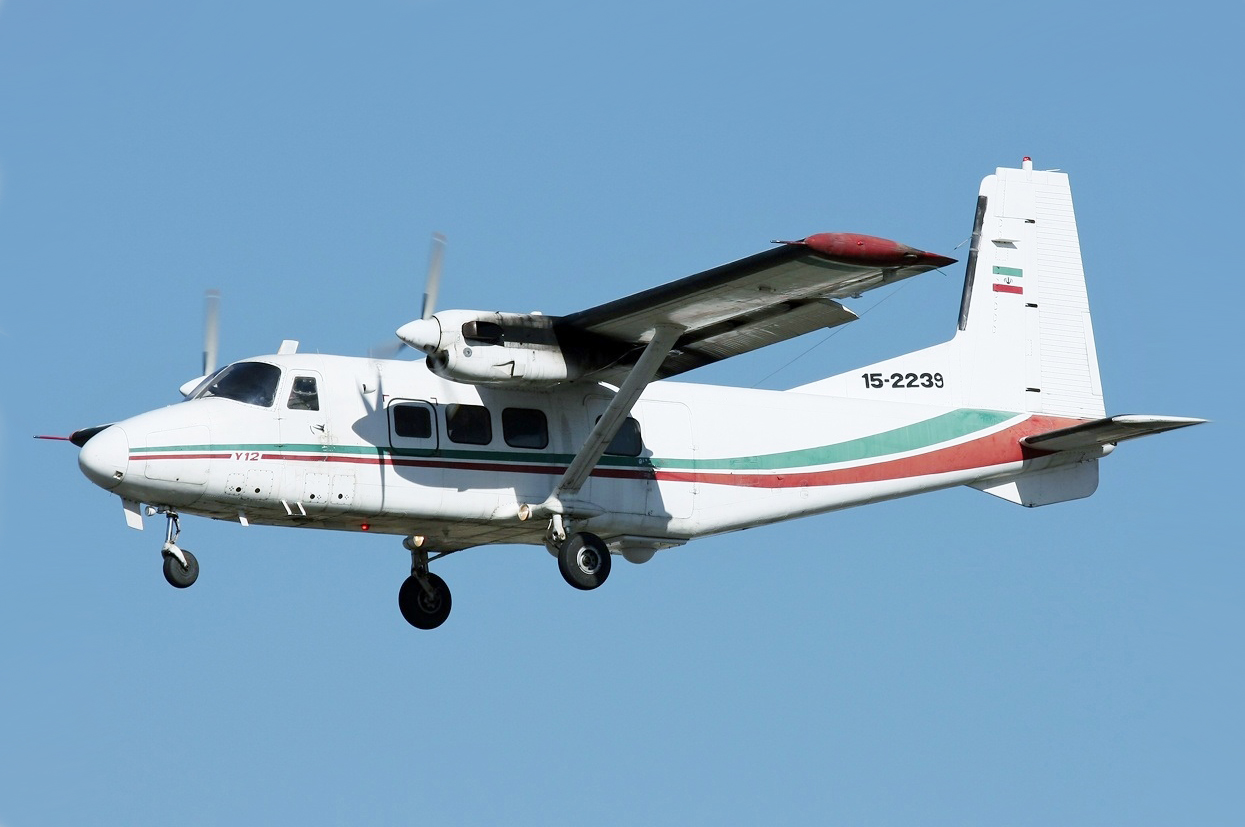
- Harbin Y-12 II of the Iranian IRGC

General information
- Type: Twin-engine turboprop utility aircraft
- National origin: China
- Manufacturer: Harbin Aircraft Industry Group
- Status: In service, in production
- Primary users: People's Liberation Army Air Force Myanmar Air Force; Iran Revolutionary Guard Air Force; Zambian Air Force
- Number built: 300+

History
- Manufactured: 1985–present
- First flight: 14 July 1982
- Developed from: Harbin Y-11

The Harbin Y-12 (Chinese: 运-12; pinyin: Yùn-12) is a high wing twin-engine turboprop utility aircraft built by Harbin Aircraft Industry Group (HAIG). It is the first Chinese-designed and produced aircraft to receive a type certificate from the Federal Aviation Administration (FAA) in March 1995. Around 300 aircraft were delivered by 2023.

== Design and development ==
The Y-12 started as a development of the Harbin Y-11 airframe called Y-11T in 1980. The design featured numerous improvements including a redesigned wing with a new low drag section, a larger fuselage and bonded rather than riveted construction. It also replaced the radial piston engines with turboprops.

The prototype first flew in 1982, followed by about 30 production Y-12 (I) aircraft before a revised version was produced. This was designated the Y-12 (II), which featured more powerful engines and removal of leading edge slats, first flying on 16 August 1984 and receiving Chinese certification in December of the following year.

China and the US signed a bilateral airworthiness agreement to allow the FAA and General Administration of Civil Aviation of China overseeing the manufacture of US aircraft in China in 1991. Harbin Aircraft Manufacturing Corporation (HAMC) and the Civil Aviation Administration of China (CAAC) applied for Part 23 certification of the Y-12 in September 1992. Modifications are made to the Y-12 (II) to meet US requirements, including a larger, reshaped, wing with wing-lets and landing gear reinforced with stronger struts. The power plants are two locally made Pratt & Whitney Canada PT6A-27 turboprops with Hartzell propellers. The Y-12 has a maximum takeoff weight of 5,700 kg (12,600 lb) with seating for 17 passengers and two crew. The aircraft is operated as a light commuter and transport aircraft. The Y-12 (IV) received its type certificate from the FAA in March 1995, a first for an aircraft designed and produced in China. According to an FAA official: the Y-12 programme was a vehicle to demonstrate the CAAC's compatibility with FAR Part 23 and most Chinese CCAR-23 certification procedures for small-category aircraft are recognised by the FAA. In early 1995, it is reported overseas sales totaled 61 aircraft to 13 countries including Fiji, Malaysia, Nepal and Peru.

In 1999, HAMC was reorganised into Hafei Aviation Industry (HAI).

The latest development is the Y-12F, which is almost a new design with many improvements: new wings, landing gear, fuselage, more powerful engines, and extended payload and range. The Y-12F made its maiden flight on 29 December 2010, received CAAC type certification on 10 December 2015, FAA type certification on 22 February 2016, and type certification from the EASA on 13 July 2023. In 2015, Kenmore Air announced that they would begin development of floats for the Y-12 for FAA certification. The Y-12 completed the FAA evaluation flight tests for its automatic flight control system on 30 June 2018, with its performance meeting the requirements, said AVIC Harbin Aircraft Industry Company Ltd (AVIC HAFEI).

== Variants ==
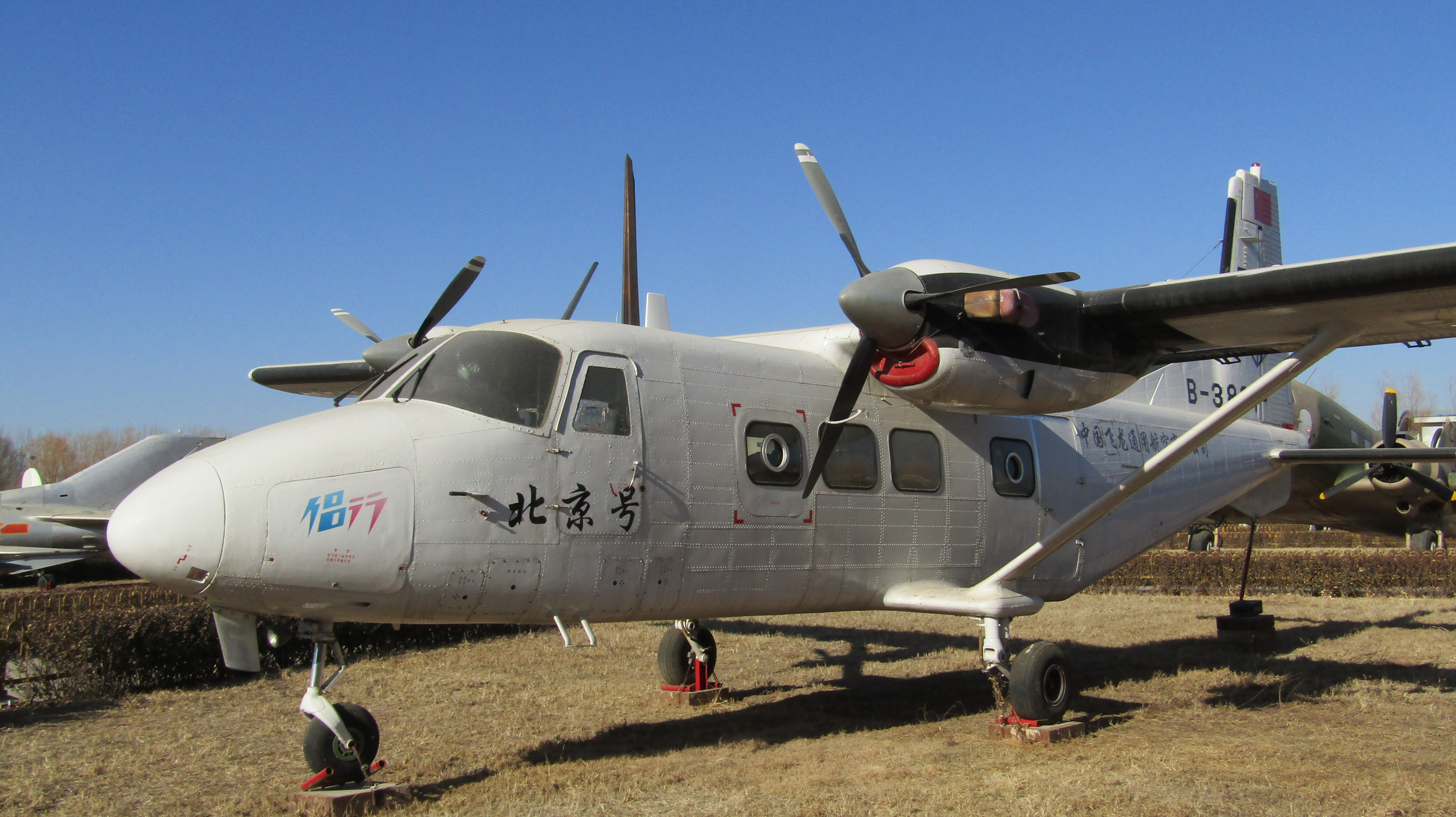
Harbin Y-12 (II) at China Aviation Museum, Beijing

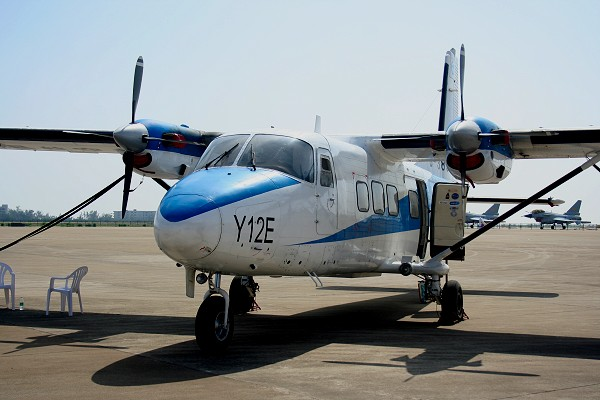
Harbin Y-12E

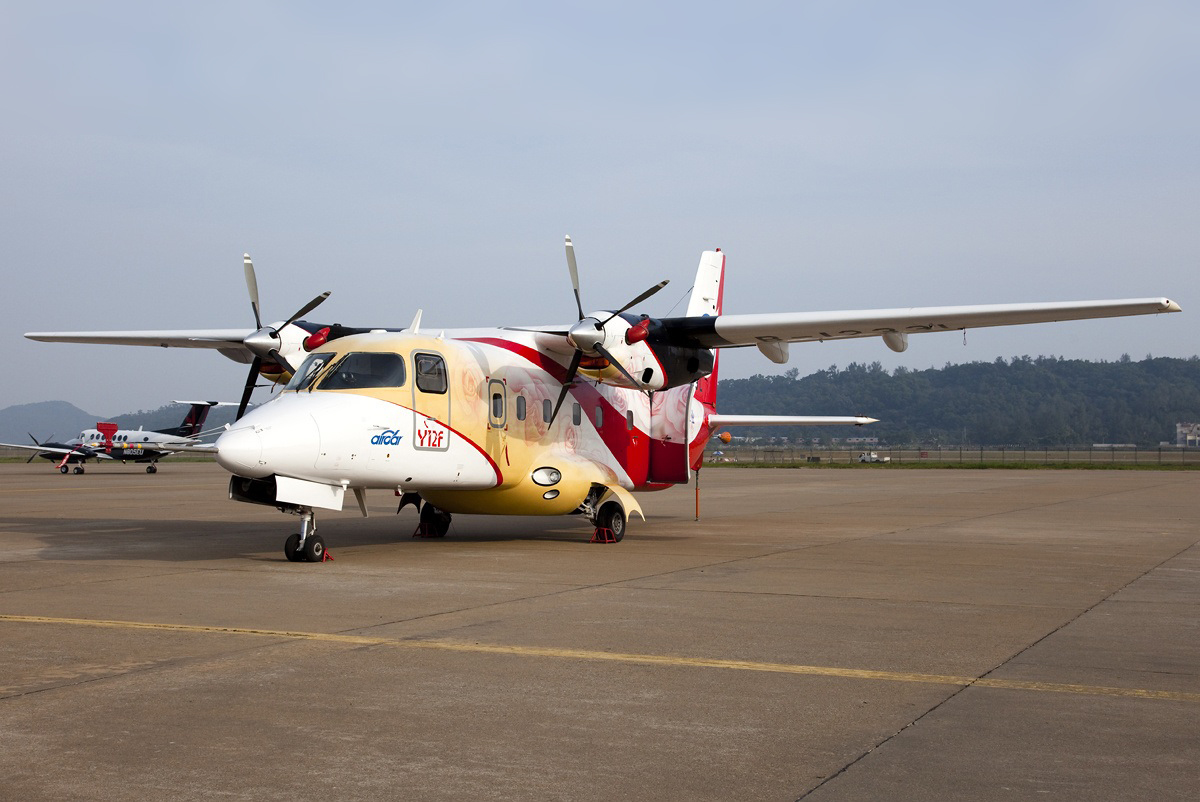
Harbin Y-12F

- Y-12 (I): Twin-engined STOL utility transport aircraft, powered by two 500-shp (373-kW) Pratt & Whitney Canada PT6A-11 turboprop engines. Seating for 17 passengers and a MTOW of 5,000 kg.
- Y-12 (II): Fitted with more powerful 600-hp PT6A-27 engines, received type certificate from UK CAA in 1990, with aircraft operate in Malaysia and Fiji.
- Y-12 (III): Planned version to be fitted with WJ-9 turboprop. Evolved to Y-12C because of IV's success when WJ-9 development was completed.
- Y-12 (IV): Improved version. Revised wingtips (span increased to 19.2 m (63 ft)) and increased max. takeoff weight to 5,700 kg. 18-19 passengers. This version is the first aircraft in the series certified by the FAA in 1995.
- Y-12C: Basically a (IV) version with WJ-9 turboprop, used by PLAAF for aerial survey.
- Y-12D: Domestically deployed military version with upgraded engines driving four-bladed propellers, used by PLA Airborne Corps for parachute training.
- Y-12E: Variant with 18 passenger seats. PT6A-135A engines of equal horsepower but increased torque driving four-bladed propellers. This version was certified by the FAA in 2006.
- Y-12F: The latest development with almost everything redesigned: wider fuselage, new wings, retractable landing gear and more powerful PT6A-65B engines. The Y-12F has higher cruise speed, longer range and can accommodate 19 passengers or 3x LD3 containers. Design started in April 2005 and the maiden flight was on 29 December 2010. CAAC type certification was received on 10 December 2015 and FAA certification on 22 February 2016. The Y-12F passed flight tests for its automatic flight control system by the FAA on 30 June 2018. It was demonstrated during the 2012 Zhuhai Airshow.
- Y-12G: Proposed cargo version of Y-12F.
- Turbo Panda: Export name for (II) version, marketed by England and Japanese companies. No real order due to airworthiness certification.
- Twin Panda: Originally (II) version for export. Later a modified Y-12 (IV) powered by two Pratt & Whitney Canada PT6A-34 turboprop engines and fitted with uprated undercarriage, upgraded avionics and interior. Thirty-five orders reportedly are received by 2000 but production did not proceed.

== Operators ==
=== Military operators ===
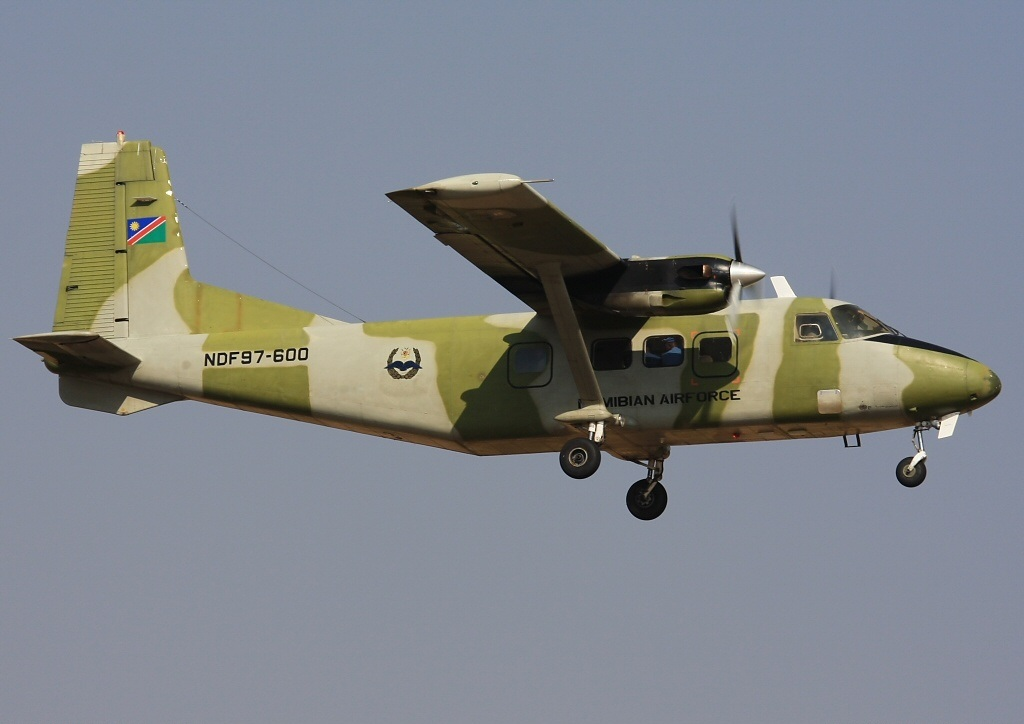
Namibian Air Force Harbin Y-12

Afghanistan

- Afghan Air Force

Cambodia

- Royal Cambodian Air Force

China

- People's Liberation Army Air Force - 12 Y-12D operated by the Airborne Corps

Djibouti

- Djibouti Air Force - 2 as of December 2016.

Eritrea

- Eritrean Air Force

Ghana

- Ghana Air Force

Guyana

- Guyana Air Force

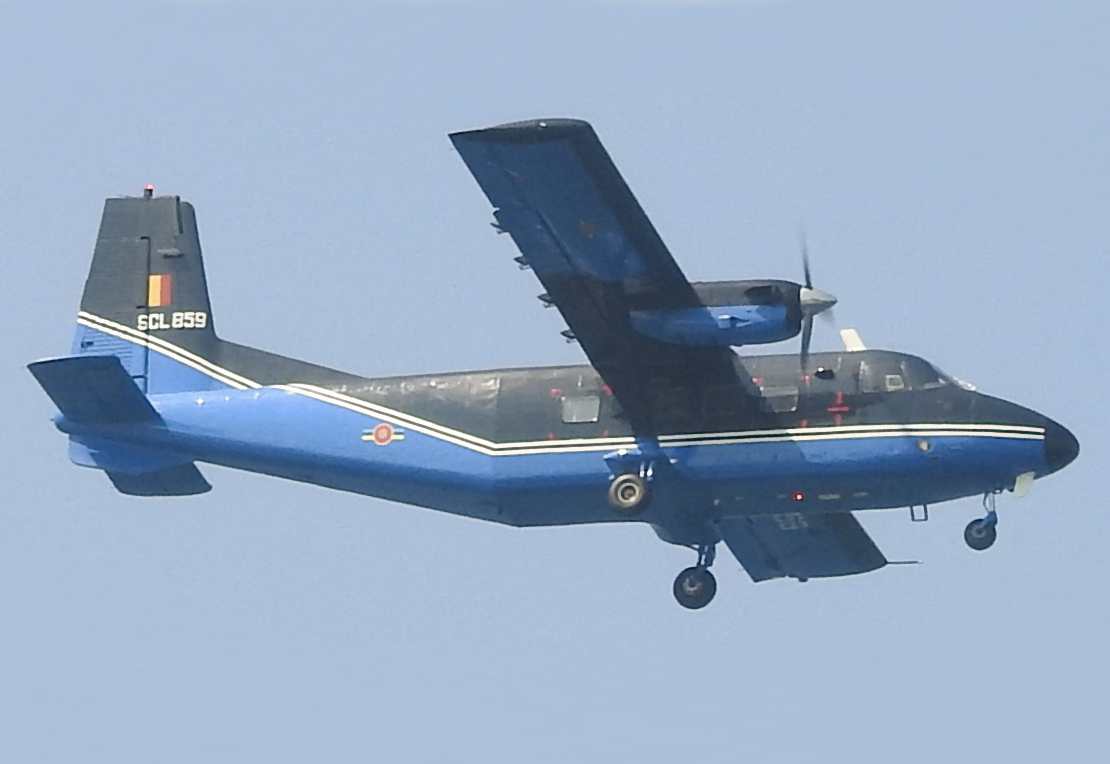
Harbin Y-12 II of the Sri Lanka Air Force

Iran

- Islamic Revolutionary Guard Corps Air Force

Kenya

- Kenya Air Force To be replaced by the C-145 Skytruck.

Mali

- Mali Air Force – 2

Mauritania

- Mauritanian Air Force

Myanmar

- Myanmar Air Force - 20 as of 2020.

Namibia

- Namibian Air Force

Pakistan

- Pakistan Air Force
- Pakistan Army Aviation Corps

Peru

- Policía Nacional del Perú
- Peruvian Air Force

Sri Lanka

- Sri Lanka Air Force

Tanzania

- Tanzanian Air Force

Zambia

- Zambian Air Force

=== Government operators ===
Costa Rica

- Air Vigilance Service (2)

China

- China Marine Surveillance (3) (Former)

Republic of the Congo

- Ministry of Transport (2)

Federated States of Micronesia

- Federated States of Micronesia (1)

Seychelles

- Republic of Seychelles (2)

=== Civil operators ===
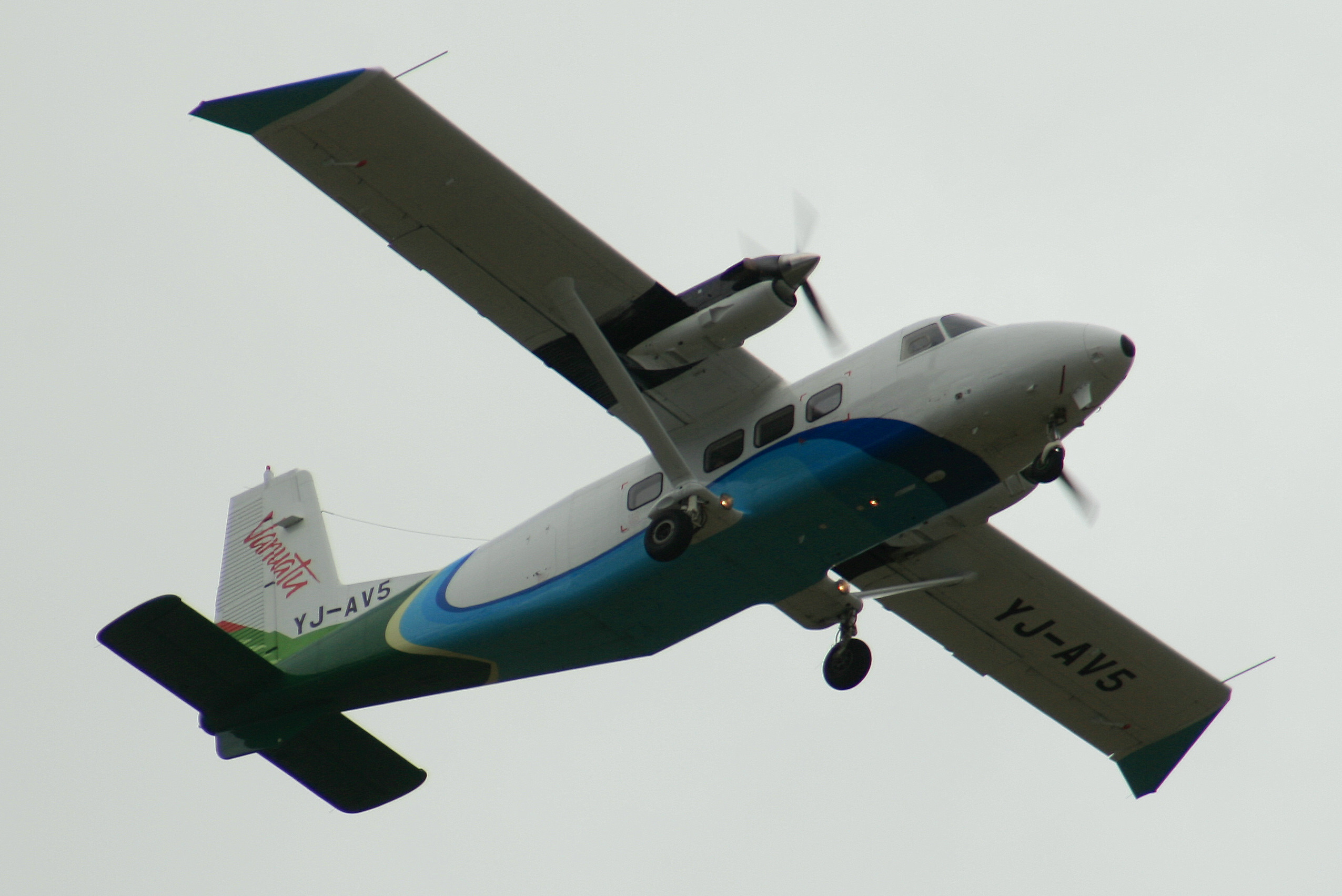
An Air Vanuatu Harbin Y-12 with revised wingtips

China

- China Flying Dragon Aviation
- China Heilongjiang Longken General Aviation
- Donghua General Aviation
- Jiangnan General Aviation
- Ordos General Aviation Co. Ltd.
- Shuangyang General Aviation
- Xinjiang General Aviation
- Ying'an Airlines
- Zhong Fei General Aviation Company

Republic of the Congo

- Trans Air Congo (10 on order)

Democratic Republic of the Congo

- LAC
- Congo Airways - 2 on order as of July 2016.

Federated States of Micronesia

- Caroline Islands Air

Fiji

- Air Fiji

Indonesia

- Sabang Merauke Raya Air Charter (SMAC)
- Dirgantara Air Service (DAS)

Iran

- Pouya Air

Kiribati

- Air Kiribati

Malaysia

- Berjaya Air

Pakistan

- Air Eagle

Sri Lanka

- Helitours

Tonga

- Lulutai Airlines (1)

Uganda

- Uganda Air Cargo (2)

==== Former operators ====
Colombia

- SATENA-3 donated by China, last operated in 2019.

Mongolia

- MIAT Mongolian Airlines- After 2 planes crashed, the remaining 3 planes were returned to the manufacturer.

Nepal

- Nepal Airlines - 4 Delivered in 2012. All 4 grounded in 2020 due to sub-standard performance and high operating costs.

== Accidents and incidents ==
- On 13 December 1993, a Lao Aviation (now Lao Airlines) Y-12-II, registration RDPL-34117, clipped trees in fog and crashed at Phonsavan, Laos, killing all 18 on board.
- On 4 April 1995, a TANS Y-12-II, registration 333/OB-1498, crashed shortly after takeoff from Iquitos Airport, Peru, killing all three on board.
- On 21 June 1996, a China Flying Dragon Aviation Y-12-II, registration B-3822, crashed into a 100 m (330 ft) mountain near Changhai Airport after the crew began the final approach too early and deviated from the intended course, killing two of 12 on board.
- On 20 January 1997, a Sri Lanka Air Force Y-12-II, CR851, crashed off Palali Air Base while on a surveillance mission, killing all four on board.
- On 10 June 1997, a MIAT Mongolian Airlines Y-12-II, registration JU-1020, crashed at Mandalgobi Airport due to windshear, killing seven of 12 on board.
- On 26 May 1998, a MIAT Mongolian Airlines Y-12-II, registration JU-1017, crashed into a 10,800 ft (3,300 m) mountain near Galt, Mongolia, en route to Tosontsengel due to heavy icing, wing de-ice system fault and overloading, killing all 28 on board; this crash is the worst ever accident involving the Y-12.
- On 19 October 2000, Lao Aviation Flight 703 crashed in a mountainous area in bad weather while on approach to Sam Neua, killing eight of 15 passengers; both pilots survived.
- On 18 May 2005, a Zambia Air Force Y-12-II, AF-216, crashed shortly after takeoff from Mongu Airport, killing all 13 on board.
- On 10 April 2006, a Kenya Air Force (KAF) Y-12-II, 132, struck the side of Mount Marsabit, killing 14 of 17 on board.
- On 15 June 2008, a China Flying Dragon Aviation Y-12-II, registration B-3841, struck a small hill during a survey flight for a new aluminum mine, killing three of four on board.
- On 12 July 2012, a Y-12-II of the Mauritanian Air Force crashed while transporting gold, killing all 7 occupants.
- On 12 May 2014, a Y-12-II of the Kenyan Air Force crashed in El Wak, Kenya. The airplane operated on a flight from Mandera to Nairobi with stops at El Wak and Garissa. Preliminary information suggests that one pilot was killed and the remaining eleven occupants were injured.
- On 26 August 2018, a Y-12e of the Colombian Air Force was damaged in flight as it encountered severe turbulence. The pilot made an emergency landing at Florencia. The aircraft was not repaired, and was scrapped in situ.
- On 3 January 2020, a Y-12-II of the Sri Lankan Air Force crashed to Haputale, Sri Lanka, while on aerial observations, killing all 4 airmen.
- On 4 August 2020, a Y-12-II of the Kenyan Air Force resupplying AMISOM crashed after taking off from Dhobley Airstrip in Somalia. All 10 occupants survived. The aircraft was seriously damaged.

== Aircraft on display ==
=== Colombia ===
- Y-12E on static display at the History Museum of the Armed Forces of Colombia, Tocancipá.

== Specifications (Y-12 (II)) ==
Data from Brassey's World Aircraft & Systems Directory 1999/2000, Jane's all the World's Aircraft 2000–01

General characteristics

- Crew: 2
- Capacity: 17 max / 1,700 kg (3,748 lb) max payload
- Length: 14.86 m (48 ft 9 in)
- Wingspan: 17.235 m (56 ft 7 in)
- Height: 5.575 m (18 ft 3 in)
- Wing area: 34.27 m^{2} (368.9 sq ft)
- Airfoil: LS(1)-0417
- Empty weight: 2,840 kg (6,261 lb)
- Max takeoff weight: 5,300 kg (11,684 lb)
- Fuel capacity: 1,616 L (427 US gal; 355 imp gal) / 1,230 kg (2,712 lb) max usable fuel weight
- Powerplant: 2 × Pratt & Whitney Canada PT6A-27 turboprop engines, 462 kW (620 hp) each
- Propellers: 3-bladed Hartzell HC-B3TN-3B/T10173B-3, 2.49 m (8 ft 2 in) diameter constant-speed fully-feathering reversible-pitch propellers (4 and 5 bladed propellers used on some models)

Performance

- Maximum speed: 328 km/h (204 mph, 177 kn) V_{MO} (maximum operating speed) at 3,000 m (9,800 ft)
- Cruise speed: 292 km/h (181 mph, 158 kn) (max) at 3,000 m (9,800 ft)

250 km/h (160 mph; 130 kn) (economical) at 3,000 m (9,800 ft)

- Range: 1,340 km (830 mi, 720 nmi) at econ cruise, 45 min reserves at 3,000 m (9,800 ft)
- Endurance: 5 hours 12 minutes at econ cruise
- Service ceiling: 7,000 m (23,000 ft)

3,000 m (9,800 ft) on one engine

- Rate of climb: 8.1 m/s (1,590 ft/min)

1.4 m/s (4.6 ft/s) on one engine

- Wing loading: 145.9 kg/m^{2} (29.9 lb/sq ft)
- Power/mass: 0.106 kW/kg (0.064 hp/lb)
- Take-off run: 370 m (1,210 ft)
- Take-off run to 15 m (49 ft): 490 m (1,610 ft)
- Landing run: 340 m (1,120 ft)
- Landing run from 15 m (49 ft): 630 m (2,070 ft)

== See also ==
Aircraft of comparable role, configuration, and era

- Antonov An-28/PZL M28 Skytruck
- Beechcraft 1900
- Beechcraft Model 99
- Britten-Norman BN-2 Islander/Britten-Norman BN-2A Trislander
- CASA C-212 Aviocar
- Cessna 408 SkyCourier
- Dornier 228
- De Havilland Canada DHC-6 Twin Otter
- IAI Arava
- Indonesian Aerospace N-219
- GAF Nomad
- Let L-410 Turbolet/Let L-410NG
- Let L-610
- Short 330/Short 360
- Short SC.7 Skyvan

Related lists

- List of Chinese aircraft
- List of light transport aircraft
- List of civil aircraft
