= Mil Mi-26 =

Soviet/Russian heavy transport helicopter

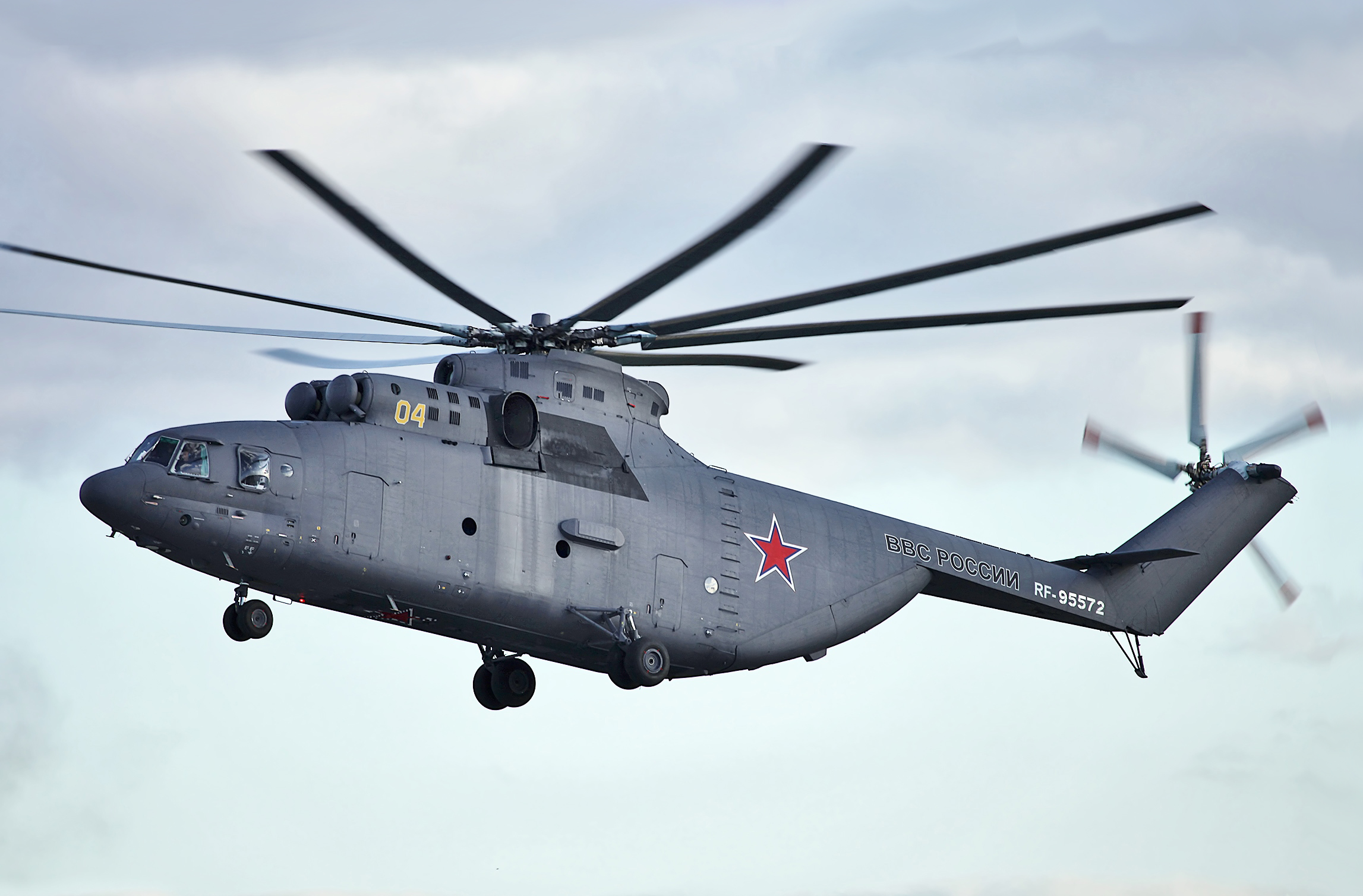
- A Russian Air Force Mi-26

General information
- Type: Heavy lift transport helicopter
- National origin: Soviet Union/Russia
- Manufacturer: Rostvertol
- Designer: Mil Moscow Helicopter Plant
- Status: In service
- Primary users: Russian Aerospace Forces Algerian Air Force; Utair; Russian Ministry of Emergency Situations
- Number built: Over 300 as of 2026

History
- Manufactured: 1980–present
- Introduction date: 1983
- First flight: 14 December 1977

The Mil Mi-26 (Russian: Миль Ми-26, NATO reporting name: Halo) is a Soviet/Russian heavy transport helicopter. Its product code is Izdeliye 90. Operated by both military and civilian operators, it is the largest helicopter to have gone into serial production. (Note: The Mil V-12 is larger, but only two prototypes were built.)

== Design and development ==
Following the incomplete development of the heavier Mil Mi-12 (prototypes known as Mil V-12) in the early 1970s, work began on a new heavy-lift helicopter, designated as the Izdeliye 90 ("Project 90") and later allocated designation Mi-26. The new design was required to have an empty weight less than half its maximum takeoff weight. The helicopter was designed by Marat Tishchenko, protégé of Mikhail Mil, founder of the OKB-329 design bureau.

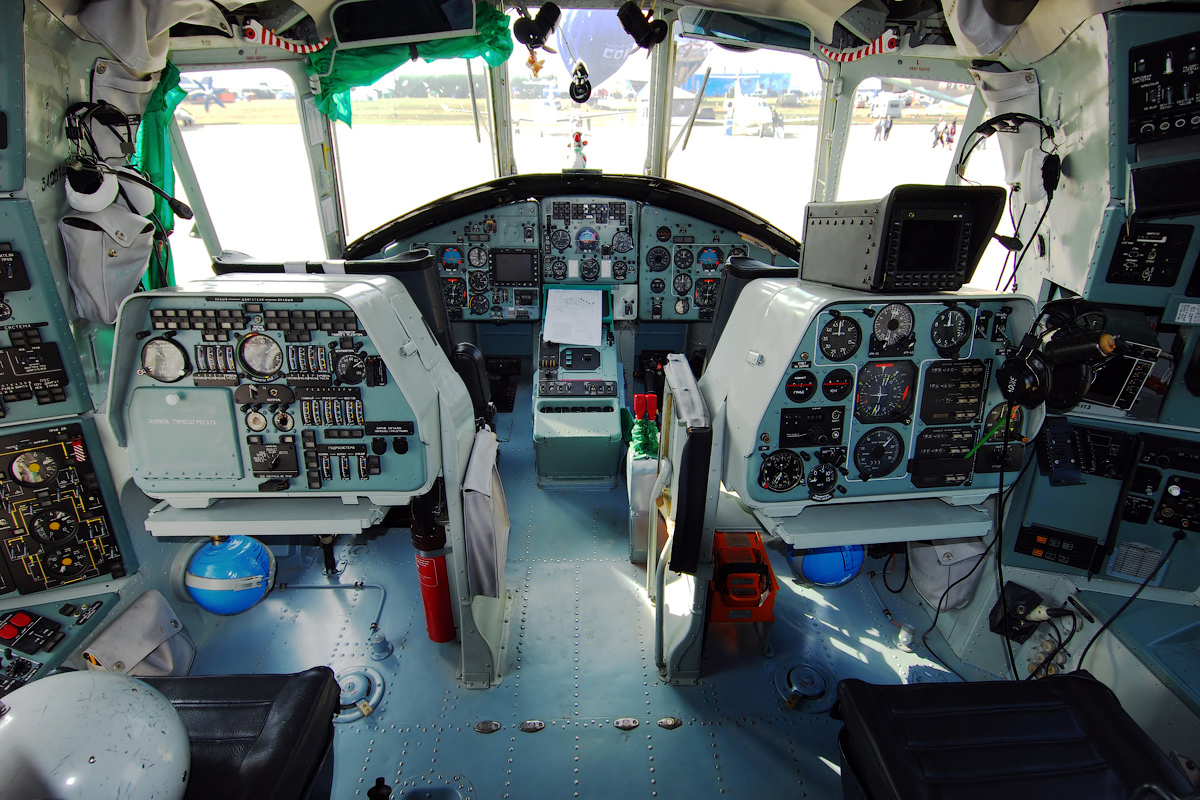
Cockpit of a Mil Mi-26

The Mi-26 was designed to replace earlier Mi-6 and Mi-12 heavy lift helicopters and act as a heavy-lift helicopter for military and civil use, having twice the cabin space and payload of the Mi-6, then the world's largest and fastest production helicopter. The primary purpose of the Mi-26 was to transport military equipment such as 13-tonne (29,000 lb) amphibious armored personnel carriers and mobile ballistic missiles to remote locations after delivery by military transport aircraft such as the Antonov An-22 or Ilyushin Il-76.

The first Mi-26 flew on 14 December 1977 and the first production aircraft was rolled out on 4 October 1980. Development was completed in 1983 and by 1985, the Mi-26 was in Soviet military and commercial service.

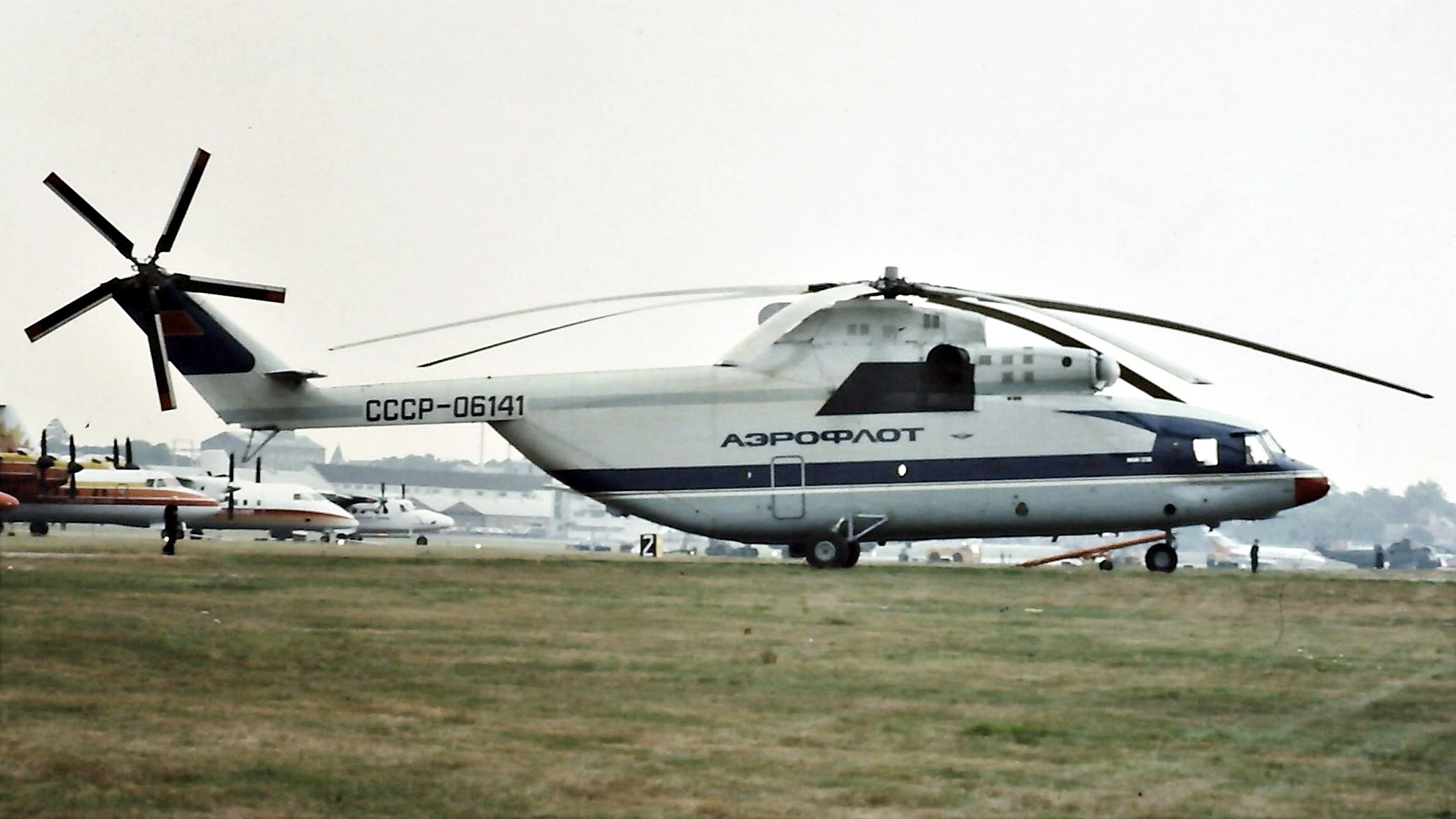
An Aeroflot Mi-26 at the 1984 Farnborough Air Show

The Mi-26 was the first factory-equipped helicopter with a single, eight-blade main lift rotor. It is capable of flight in the event of power loss by one engine (depending on aircraft mission weight) because of an engine load sharing system. While its empty weight is only slightly higher than the Mi-6's, the Mi-26 has a payload of up to 20 tonnes (44,000 lb). It is the second largest and heaviest helicopter ever constructed, after the experimental Mil V-12. The tail rotor has about the same diameter and thrust as the four-bladed main rotor fitted to the MD Helicopters MD 500.

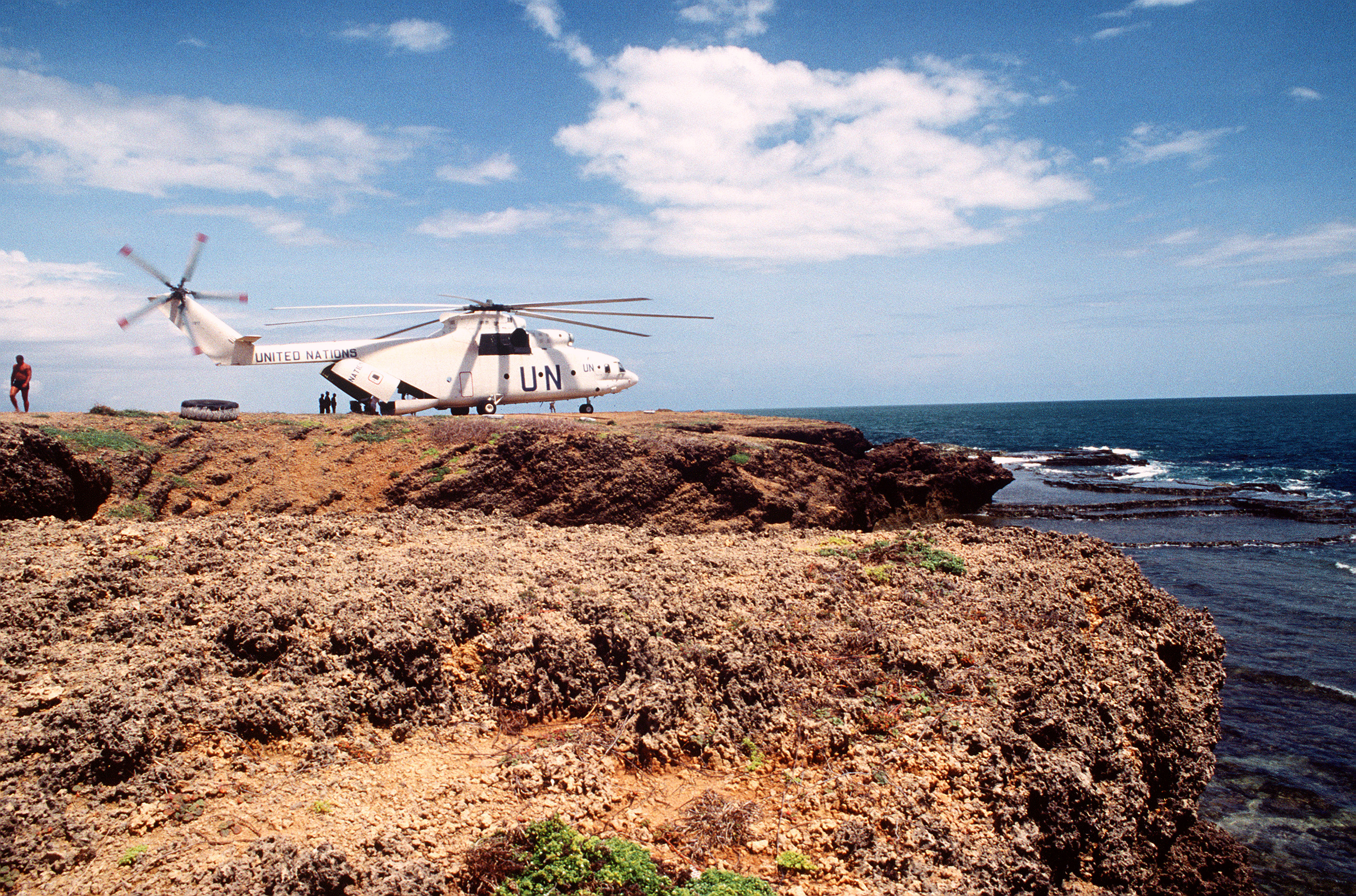
A UN Mi-26 on the shores of Kismayo, Somalia, during UNOSOM II

The Mi-26's unique main gearbox is relatively light at 3,639 kg (8,023 lb) but can absorb 14,700 kilowatts (19,725 shp), which was accomplished using a non-planetary, split-torque design with quill shafts for torque equalization. The Mil Design Bureau designed the VR-26 transmission itself, due to Mil's normal gearbox supplier not being able to design such a gearbox. The gearbox housing is stamped aluminum. A split-torque design is also used in the 5,670 kg (12,500 lb) gearbox assembly on the American three-engine Sikorsky CH-53K King Stallion.

As of 2024, the Mi-26 still holds the Fédération Aéronautique Internationale world record for the greatest mass lifted by a helicopter to 2,000 metres (6,562 ft) – 56,768.8 kilograms (125,000 lb) on a flight in 1982.

Rostvertol, the Russian helicopter manufacturer, was contracted to refurbish and upgrade the entire fleet of Mi-26s serving in the Russian Air Force, estimated to be around 20 helicopters. The upgraded aircraft is comparable to a new variant, the Mi-26T. Contract completion was planned for 2015. The contract also covered the production of 22 new Mi-26T helicopters. Eight new-built helicopters were delivered to operational units by January 2012. Under the 2010 contract, 17 new-production helicopters were delivered by 2014. In all, Rostvertol delivered fourteen Mi-26s to domestic and foreign customers in the period 2012‑14 and six helicopters in 2015. Deliveries to the Russian Aerospace Forces were continued in 2016, 2017 and 2019.

In 2016, Russia started development of PD-12V, a variant of the Aviadvigatel PD-14 turbofan engine to power the Mi-26.

== Operational history ==
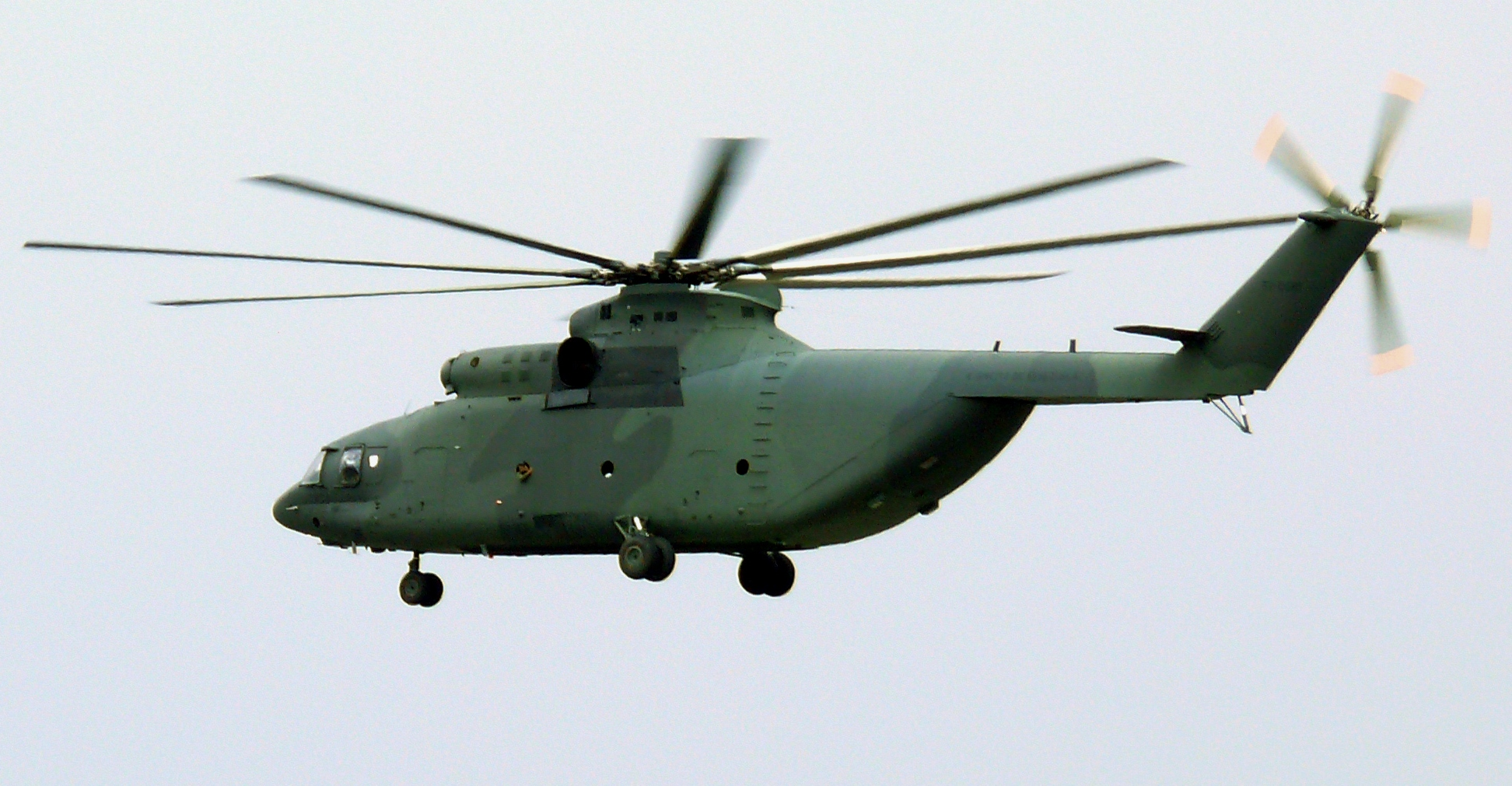
A Mi-26 in a military parade over Caracas, Venezuela

=== Buran programme ===
The developers of the Buran space vehicle programme considered using Mi-26 helicopters to "bundle" lift components for the Buran spacecraft, but test flights with a mock-up showed this to be risky and impractical.

=== Chernobyl accident ===
The Mi-26S was a disaster response version hastily developed during the containment efforts of the Chernobyl nuclear accident in 1986. Thirty Mi-26 were used for radiation measurements and precision drops of insulating material to cover the damaged No. 4 reactor. It was also equipped with a deactivating liquid tank and underbelly spraying apparatus. The Mi-26S was operated in immediate proximity to the nuclear reactor, with a filter system and protective screens mounted in the cabin to protect the crew during delivery of construction materials to the most highly contaminated areas.

=== Siberian Woolly Mammoth recovery ===
In October 1999, an Mi-26 was used to transport a 23-tonne (25-short-ton) block of frozen soil encasing a preserved, 23,000-year-old woolly mammoth (Jarkov Mammoth) from the Siberian tundra to a lab in Khatanga, Russia. Due to the weight of the load, the Mi-26 had to be returned to the factory afterward to check for airframe and rotor warping caused by the potential of structural over-stressing.

=== Afghanistan Chinook recovery ===
In early 2002, a civilian Mi-26 was leased to recover two U.S. Army MH-47E Chinook helicopters from a mountain in Afghanistan. While the second craft was too badly damaged to recover, the first was determined to be repairable and estimated to weigh 12 tonnes (26,000 lb) with fuel, rotors, and non-essential equipment removed. That weight exceeded the maximum payload of 9.1 tonnes (20,000 lb) at an altitude of 2,600 metres (8,500 ft) of the U.S. military's Sikorsky CH-53E.

The Mi-26 was located through Skylink Aviation in Toronto, which had connections with a Russian company called Sportsflite that operated three civilian Mi-26 versions called "Heavycopters". One of the aircraft, aiding in construction and firefighting work in neighboring Tajikistan, was leased for $300,000; it lifted the Chinook, flew it to Kabul, then later to Bagram Air Base, Afghanistan to ship to Fort Campbell, Kentucky, U.S. for repairs. Six months later, a second U.S. Army CH-47 that had made a hard landing 160 kilometres (100 mi) north of Bagram at an altitude of 1,200 metres (3,900 ft) was recovered by another Sportsflite-operated Mi-26 Heavycopter.

=== Chechnya shoot down crash ===
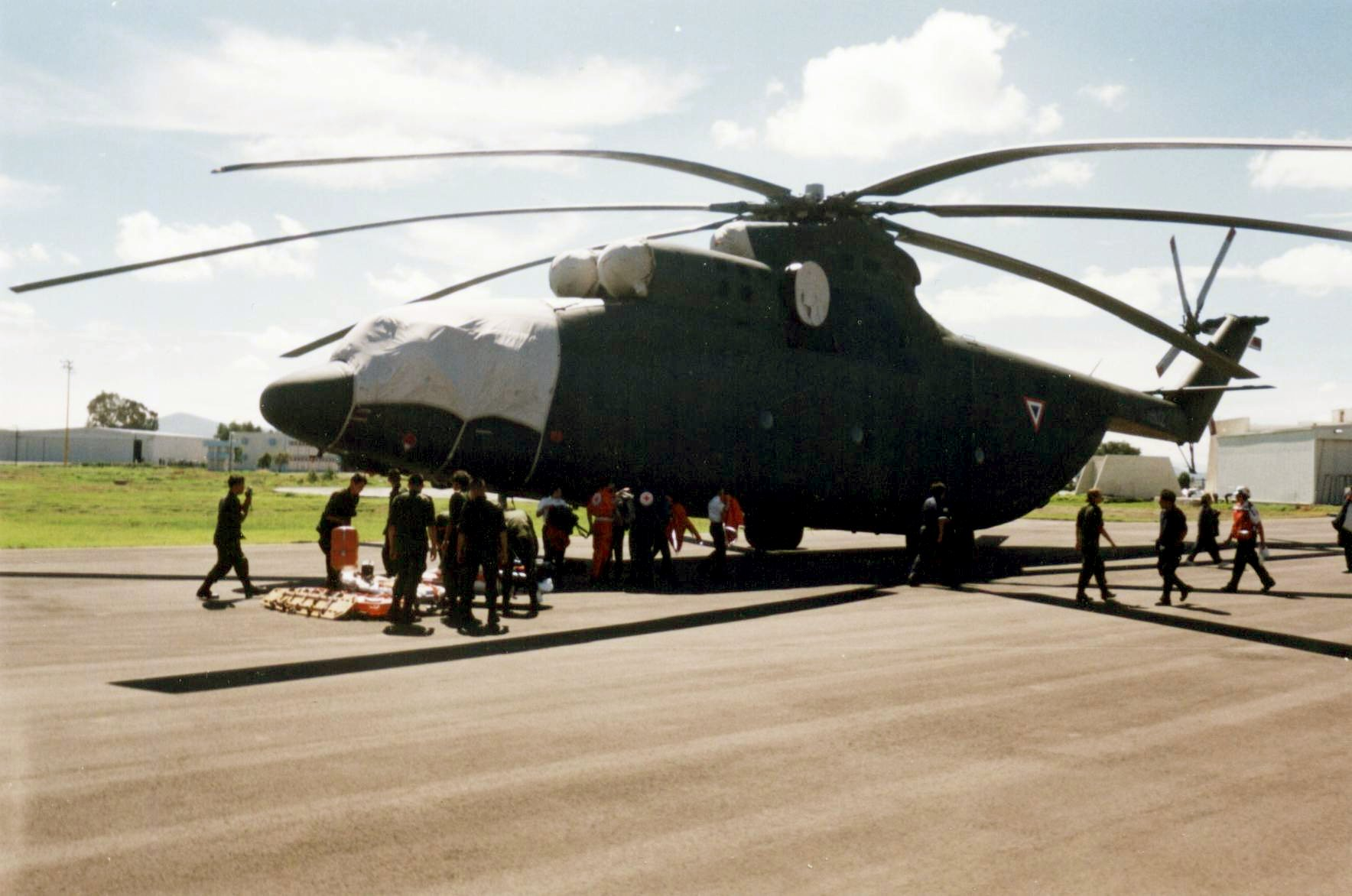
A Mexican Air Force Mil Mi-26 being loaded at Santa Lucía Air Force Base, Mexico

On 19 August 2002, Chechen separatists hit an overloaded Mi-26 with a surface-to-air missile, causing it to crash-land in a minefield, killing 127 of the people on board – the greatest loss of life in the history of helicopter aviation.

=== China, Wenchuan "quake lake" emergency ===
As a result of the magnitude 8.0 earthquake in Sichuan province of China on 12 May 2008, many rivers became blocked by landslides, resulting in the formation of so-called quake lakes: large amounts of water pooling up behind the landslide-formed dams. These dams eventually broke under the weight of the water, endangering those downstream. At least one Mi-26 belonging to a branch of China's civil aviation service was used to bring heavy earth moving tractors to the quake-lakes at Tangjiashan mountain, located in difficult terrain and accessible only by foot or air.

=== Afghanistan helicopter downing ===
In July 2009, a Moldovan Mi-26 was shot down in Helmand province with the loss of six Ukrainian crew members. The aircraft, belonging to Pecotox Air, was said to be on a humanitarian mission under NATO contract.

=== Indian Air Force Mi-26 crash ===
On 14 December 2010, an Indian Air Force Mi-26 crashed seconds after taking off from Jammu Airport, injuring all nine passengers. The aircraft fell from an altitude of about 15 metres (50 ft). The Indian Institute of Flight Safety released an investigation report that stated improper fastening of the truck inside caused an imbalance of the helicopter and led to the crash. The Mi-26 had been carrying machines from Konkan Railway to Jammu–Baramulla line project.

The Indian Air Force later retired its three remaining Mi-26s, as two needed a very expensive overhaul (quite frequent, as the machine is near the strength limits of the materials used), and there was little need for them, and decided to obtain Chinook helicopters from the US instead.

=== Norwegian Air Force Sea King recovery ===
On 11 December 2012, a Westland Sea King from No. 330 Squadron RNoAF experienced undisclosed technical issues and made an emergency landing on Mount Divgagáisá. The landing caused parts of the landing gear to break. The Sea King was prepared by removing rotor blades and fuel before it was airlifted to Banak Air Station by a Russian Mil Mi-26 on 23 December 2012.

=== Russo-Ukrainian War ===
During the 2022 Kharkiv counteroffensive, Russian Mi-26s helicopters were involved in transfer of reinforcements on the frontline, namely in the vicinity of towns Izium and Kupiansk.

=== Iranian Red Cross and Red Crescent Society ===
In September 2024, it was announced that the Red Crescent Society of the Islamic Republic of Iran will bring this helicopter to Iran for two months in a memorandum of understanding with a Russian company, in order to purchase two Mi-26 after that if approved. Also, an understanding has been reached for the purchase of 20 new helicopters, which, if operational, will be delivered within 2 years. The Russian side has promised to equip the Red Crescent Society helicopters with night vision and new navigation.

== Variants ==
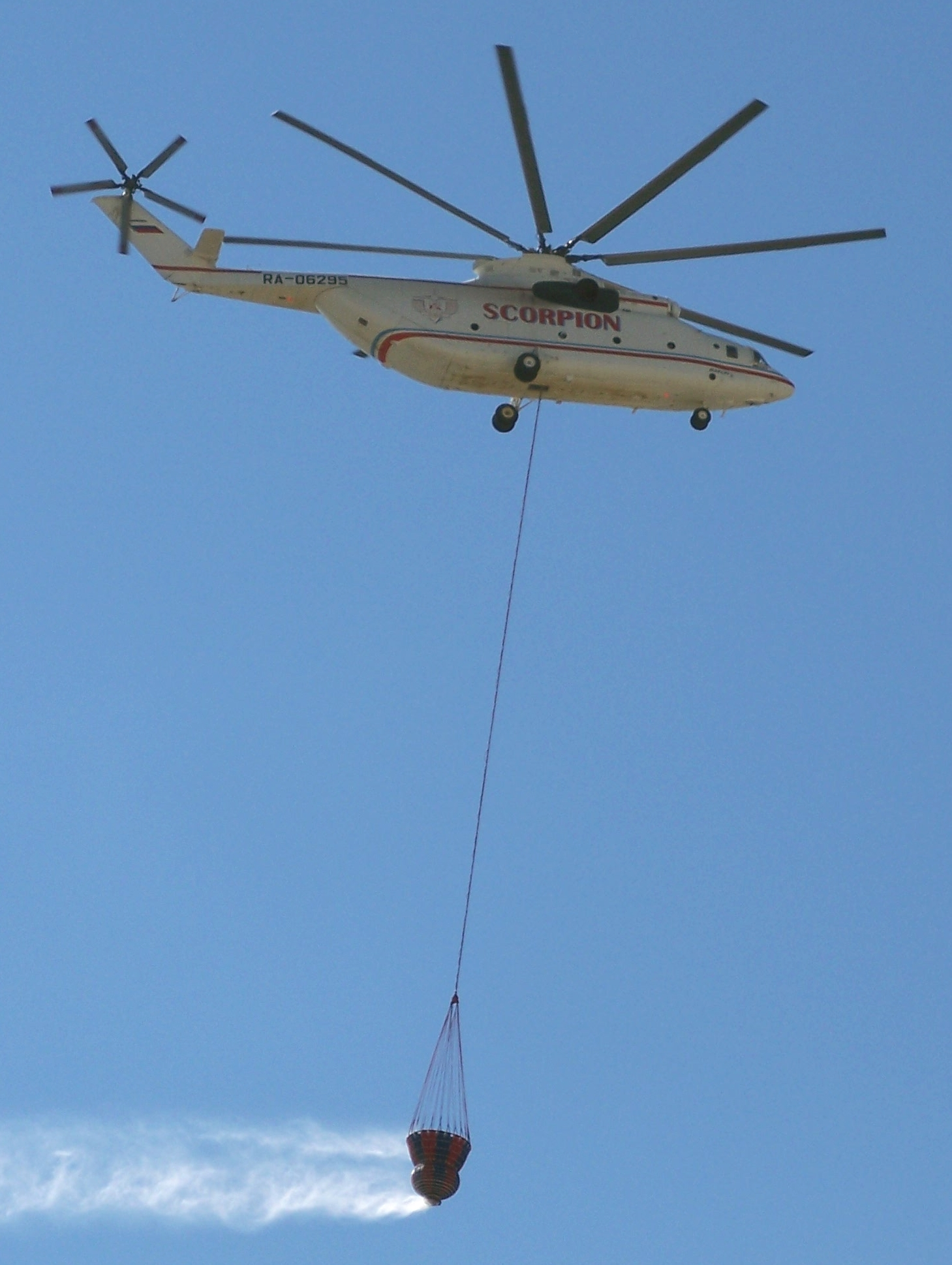
A Mi-26TC in firefighting role over Athens

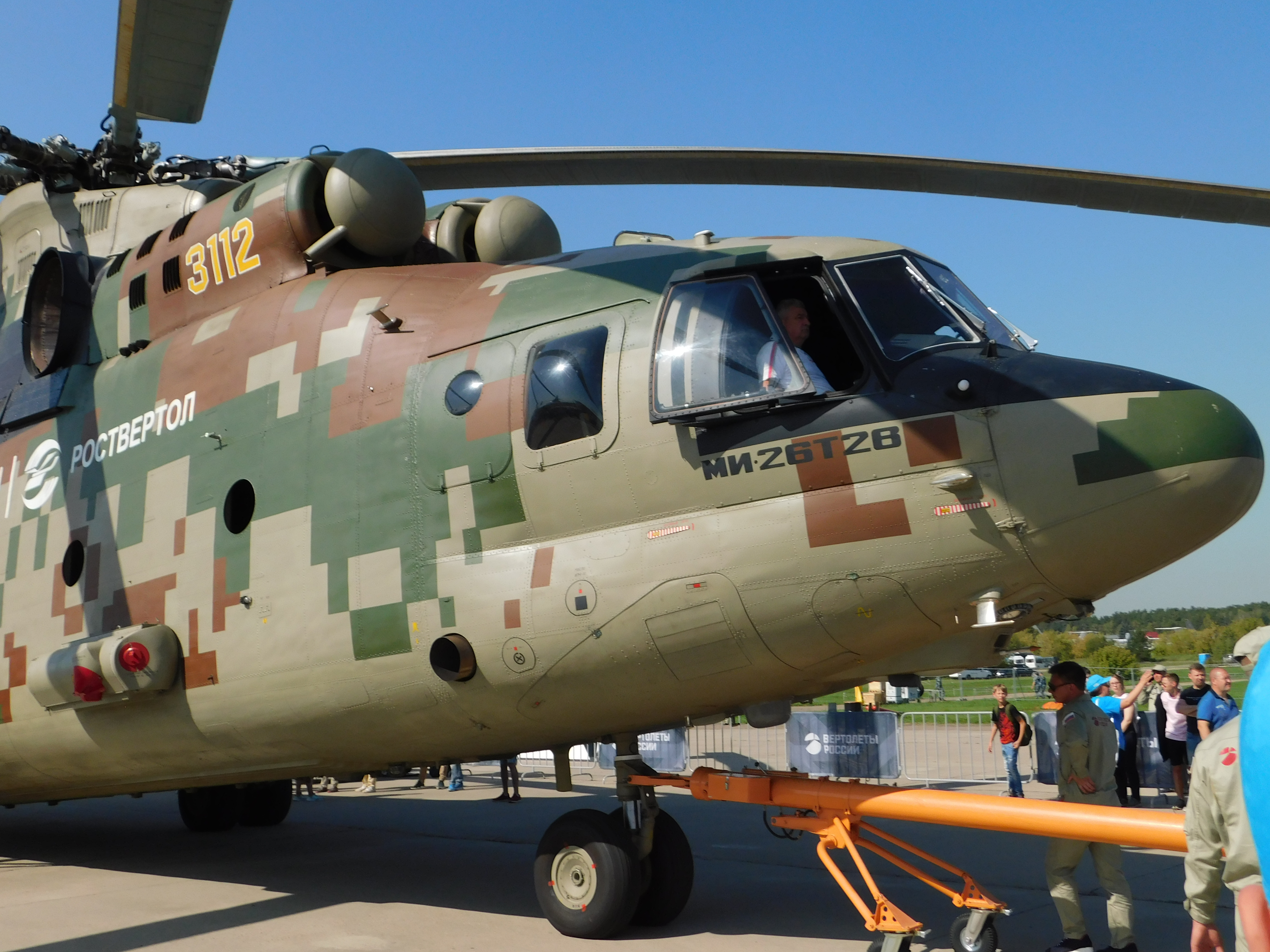
Latest version Mi-26T2V

V-29
Prototype version
Mi-26
Military cargo/freight transport version. NATO name: 'Halo-A'.
Mi-26A
Upgraded military version with a new flight/navigation system. Flown in 1985 but no production.
Mi-26M
Upgraded version of the Mi-26 with ZMKB Progress D-127 engines for better performance.
Mi-26S
Disaster response version developed in response to nuclear accident at Chernobyl.
Mi-26T
Basic civil cargo/freight transport version. Production from 1985.
Mi-26TS
Civil cargo transport version, also marketed as Mi-26TC.
Mi-26TM
Flying crane version with under-nose gondola for pilot/crane operator.
Mi-26TP
Firefighting version with internal 15,000 litres (4,000 US gal; 3,300 imp gal) fire retardant tank.
Mi-26MS
Medical evacuation version of Mi-26T. Up to 60 stretcher cases in field ambulance role, or can be equipped for intensive care or as field hospital.
Mi-26P
63 seat passenger version.
Mi-26PK
Flying crane derivative of Mi-26P.
Mi-26T2
Improved version of the Mi-26T equipped with BREO-26 airborne electronic system, allowing it to fly any time, day or night, under good and bad weather conditions. Serial production began on 22 May 2015.
Mi-26T2V
Newest modernization variant intended for the Russian military, equipped with new NPK90-2V avionics suite allowing it to fly routes in automatic mode, airborne defense complex "Vitebsk", anti-blast seats and new navigation and satellite communication systems. The cockpit is fitted with multifunctional displays with provision for use of night-vision goggles during night ops. The Mi-26T2V made its maiden flight in August 2018. Deliveries are reportedly conducted as of 2023.
Mi-27
Proposed airborne command post variant; two prototypes were built in 1988. This variant was built with foldable antennas for ground and air operations.

== Operators ==
=== Military operators ===
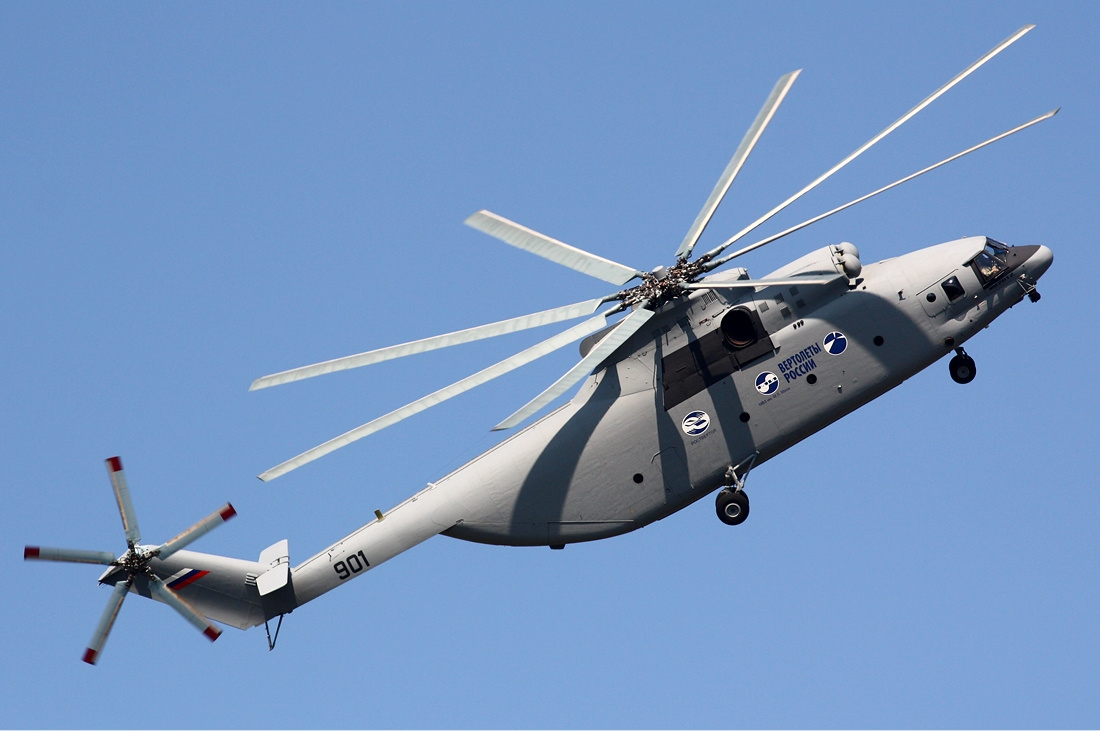
A Rostvertol Mil Mi-26T2 flight demonstration

Algeria

- Algerian Air Force

Cambodia

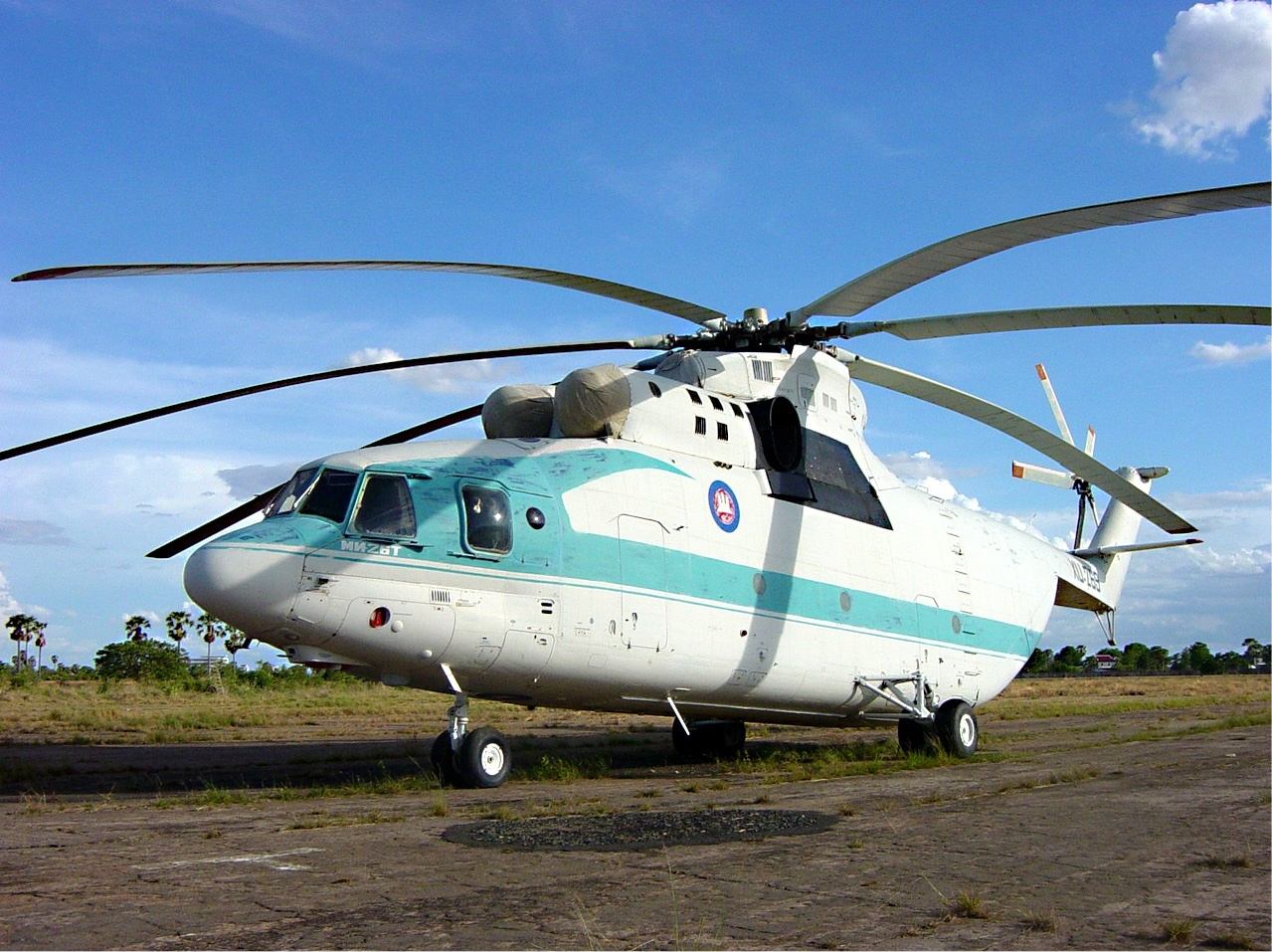
A Mi-26 of the Royal Cambodian Air Force

- Royal Cambodian Air Force
- Royal Cambodian Army

Democratic Republic of the Congo

- Congolese Democratic Air Force

Equatorial Guinea

- Equatorial Guinean Air Force

Jordan

- Royal Jordanian Air Force

Kazakhstan

- Kazakhstan Air Force

Mexico

- Mexican Air Force

North Korea

- North Korean Air Force

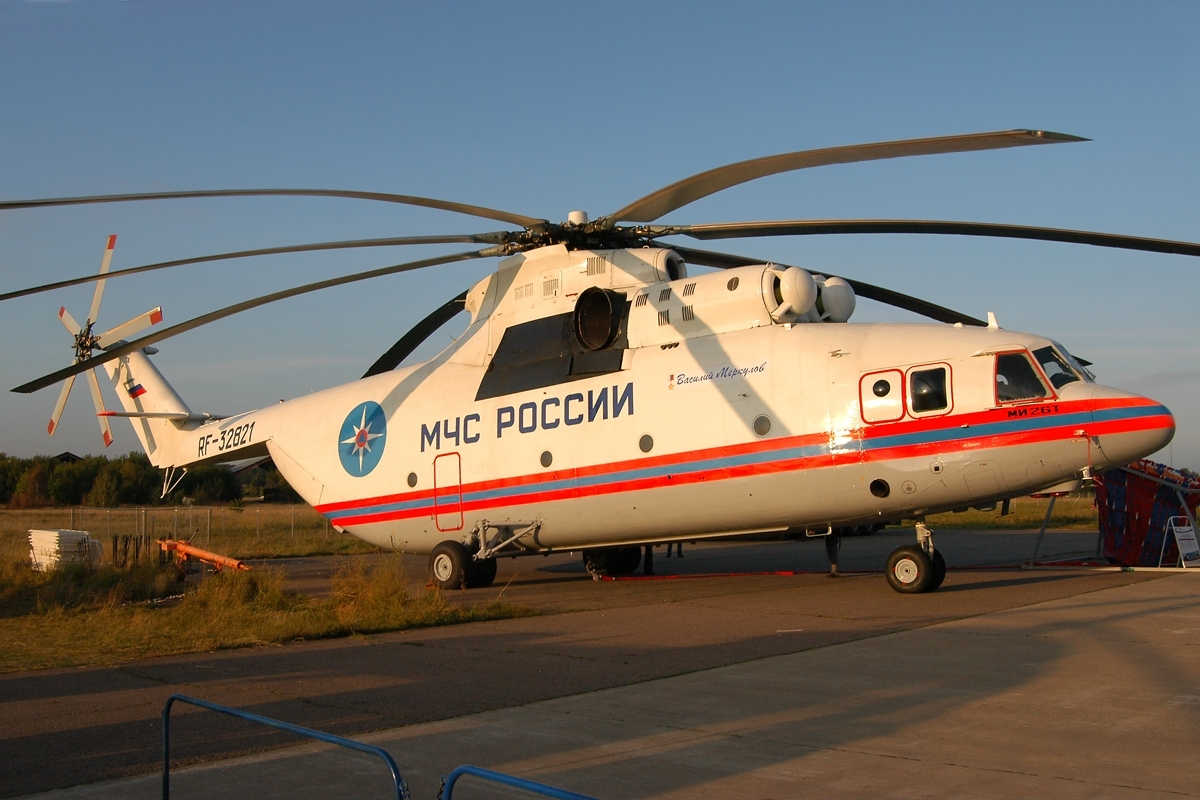
A Mi-26T from the Ministry of Emergency Situations

Russia

- Russian Aerospace Forces
- Border Service of Russia

Venezuela

- Venezuelan Army

=== Civil operators ===
China

- China Flying Dragon Aviation

Russia

- UTair Aviation

=== Former operators ===
Belarus

- Belarusian Air Force

Belgium

- Skytech

India

- Indian Air Force

Peru

- Peruvian Army

USSR

- Aeroflot
- Soviet Air Force

Ukraine

- Ukrainian Air Force

South Korea

- Samsung

== Specifications (Mi-26) ==
Mil Mi-26 3-view drawing

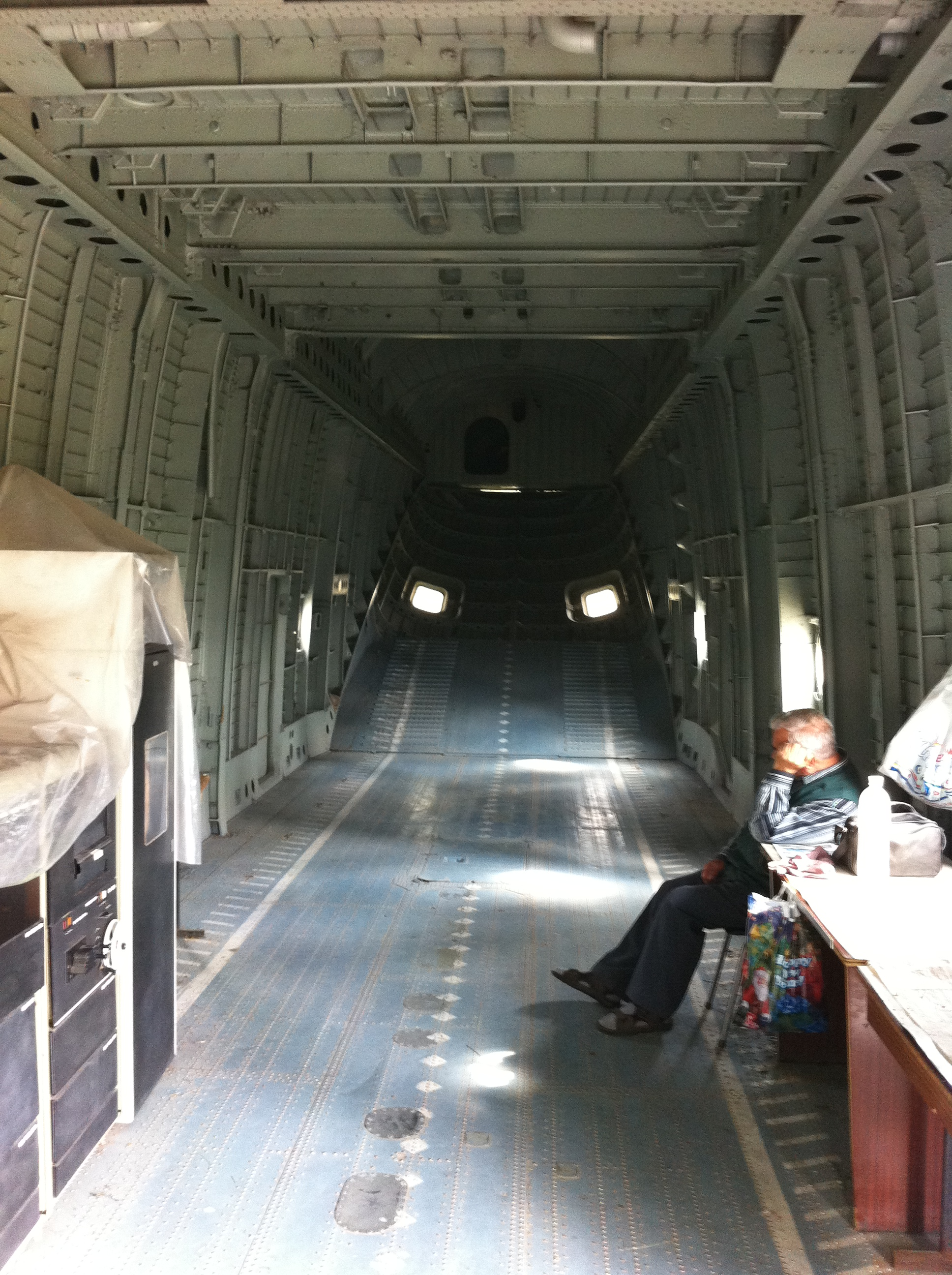
Mil-26 cargo bay

Data from Jane's All the World's Aircraft 2003–2004, Russian Helicopters

General characteristics

- Crew: 5 (2 pilots, 1 navigator, 1 flight engineer, 1 flight technician)
- Capacity: **90 troops or 60 stretchers
  - 20,000 kg (44,000 lb) cargo
- Length: 40.025 m (131 ft 4 in)
- Height: 8.145 m (26 ft 9 in)
- Empty weight: 28,200 kg (62,170 lb)
- Gross weight: 49,600 kg (109,349 lb)
- Max takeoff weight: 56,000 kg (123,459 lb)
- Fuel capacity: 12,000 L (3,200 US gal; 2,600 imp gal)
- Powerplant: 2 × ZMKB Progress D-136 turboshaft engines, 8,500 kW (11,400 hp) each
- Main rotor diameter: 32 m (105 ft 0 in)
- Main rotor area: 804.25 m^{2} (8,656.9 sq ft)
- Blade section: root: TsAGI 12%; tip: TsAGI 9%

Performance

- Maximum speed: 295 km/h (183 mph, 159 kn)
- Cruise speed: 255 km/h (158 mph, 138 kn)
- Range: 500 km (310 mi, 270 nmi) with 7,700 kg (17,000 lb) cargo
- Ferry range: 1,920 km (1,190 mi, 1,040 nmi) (with auxiliary tanks)
- Service ceiling: 4,600 m (15,100 ft) operational, 1,524 metres (5,000 ft) HOGE at max. gross weight

== See also ==
Aircraft of comparable role, configuration, and era

- Boeing CH-47 Chinook
- Mil Mi-6
- Mil V-12
- Sikorsky CH-53E Super Stallion
- Sikorsky CH-53K King Stallion
