= Harbin Y-11 =

Geological survey aircraft

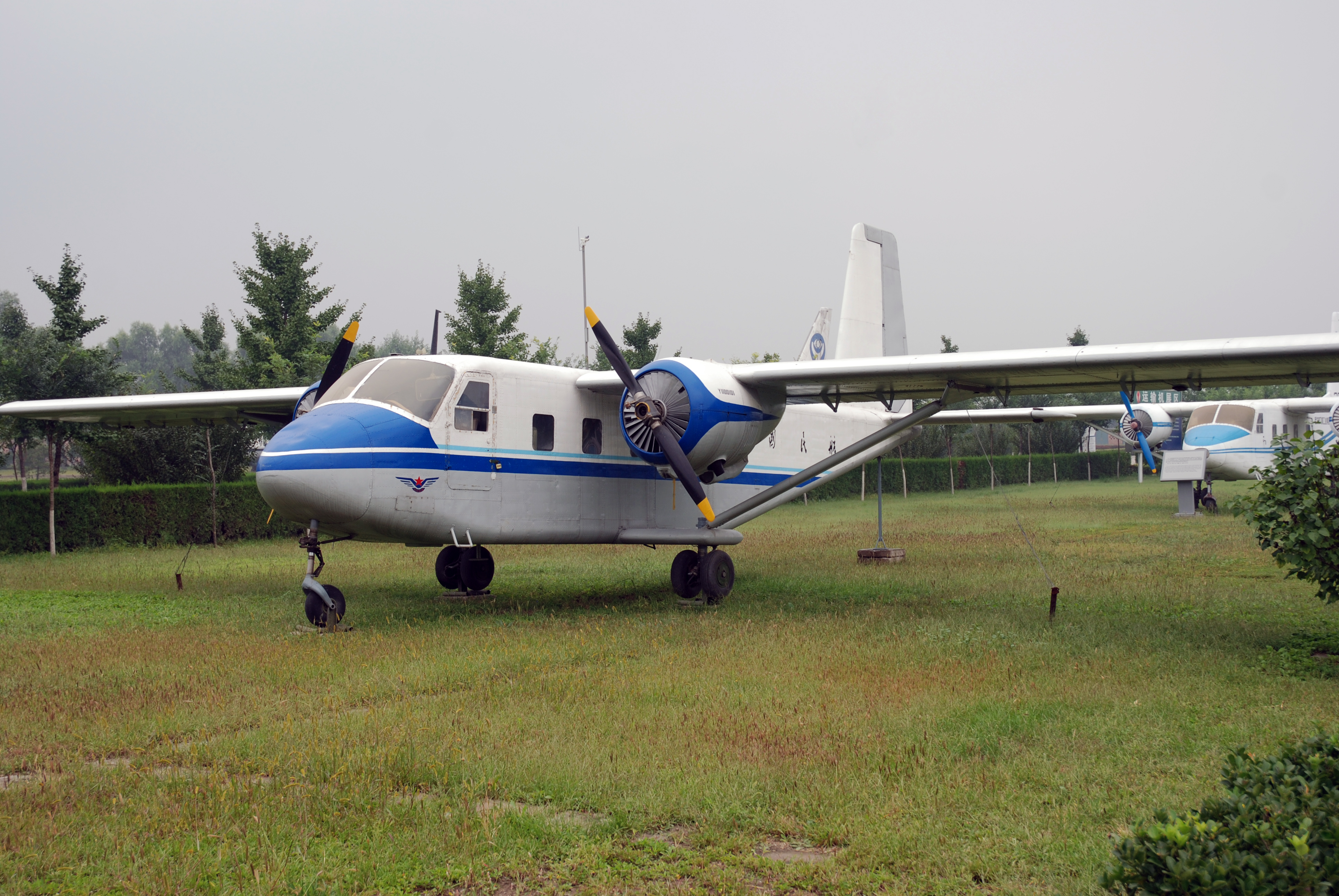
- Y-11 in the Chinese Aviation Museum

General information
- Type: utility aircraft
- Role: utility aircraft / geological survey aircraft
- Manufacturer: Harbin Aircraft Manufacturing Corporation
- Designer: Harbin Aircraft Manufacturing Corporation
- Status: Retired
- Primary user: CAAC Airlines
- Number built: ca. 50

History
- First flight: December 30, 1975
- Developed into: Harbin Y-12

The Harbin Y-11 (NATO reporting name Chan) is a high wing twin-engine piston utility and geological survey aircraft built by Harbin Aircraft Manufacturing Corporation (HAMC).

== Development ==
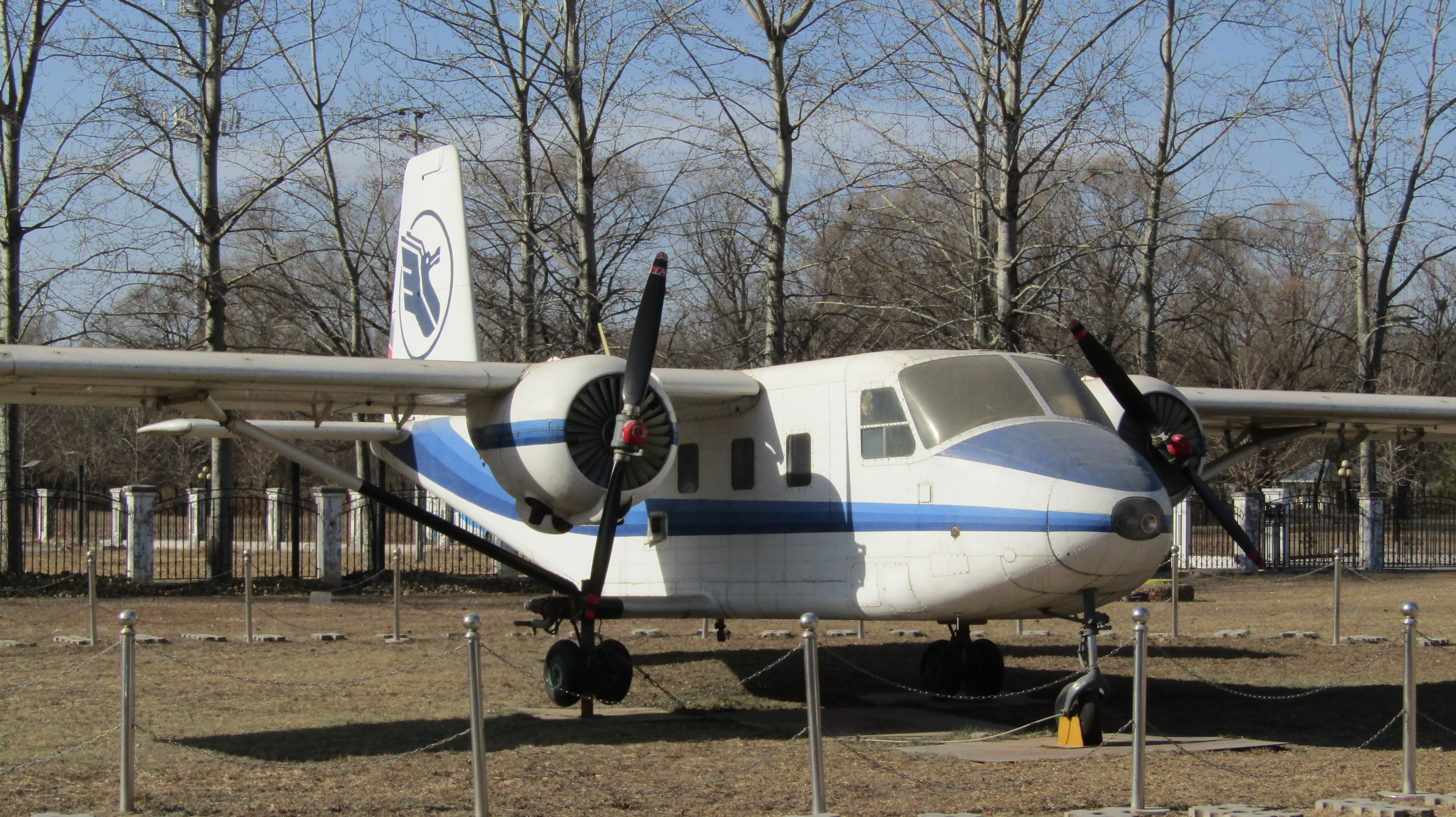
Y-11 at Beijing Civil Aviation Museum

A requirement for a twin-engined light utility transport was issued by the Chinese government in November 1974. The Y-11 was proposed in April 1974, and the design was begun in January 1975. Design of the Y-11, under Xiong Wenjie, was completed at Harbin in June 1975 and prototype construction started immediately. The static test article completed its test cycle on 19 December 1975 and the first flight of the prototype followed soon after on 30 December 1975. Production started on 3 April 1977 with at least fifty aircraft known to have been built before production stopped in favour of the Harbin Y-12.

== Variants ==
- Y-11 : Twin-engined STOL utility transport aircraft, designed for agriculture and geological survey.
- Y-11B : (I) is Fitted with advanced avionics and powered by 350 hp Teledyne -Continental TSIO-550-B air-cooled flat six piston engines. Type (II) was canceled. Later, the only flyable one was used for geological survey.
- Y-11 agricultural aircraft : Fitted with a hopper or tank in the cabin on the centre of gravity, dispensing chemicals through a dust spreader, spraybars or atomisers on the wing trailing edges.
- Y-11 Geological Survey aircraft : At least one aircraft fitted with a large toroidal sensor on the port wing-tip and a cigar shaped sensor on the starboard wing-tip.
- Y-11T : The initial designation of the Prototype Harbin Y-12, a redesigned plane fitted with Pratt & Whitney PT6A-11 turboprop engines driving three-bladed Hartzell HC-B3TN-3B propellers.

== Operators ==
China

- China Flying-Dragon Special Aviation Corp.

=== Former Operators ===
China

- CAAC Airlines operated 41 Harbin Y-11 from 1976 to 1988.

== Incidents And Accidents ==
- On June 19, 1999, a Harbin Y-11 operated by Xinjiang General Aviation crash-landed after it struck power cables during a crop spraying mission.

== Specifications ==
Data from Jane's All The World's Aircraft 1982–83

General characteristics

- Crew: 2
- Capacity:
  - 7–8 passengers or
  - 900 kg (1,984 lb) chemicals or
  - 900 L (200 imp gal; 240 US gal) chemicals
- Length: 12.02 m (39 ft 5 in)
- Wingspan: 17.00 m (55 ft 9 in)
- Height: 4.64 m (15 ft 3 in)
- Wing area: 34.00 m^{2} (366.0 sq ft)
- Aspect ratio: 8.5:1
- Airfoil: NACA 4412
- Empty weight: 2,050 kg (4,519 lb)
- Max takeoff weight: 3,250 kg (7,165 lb)
- Fuel capacity: 285 L (63 imp gal; 75 US gal)
- Powerplant: 2 × Huosai-6A 9-cylinder air-cooled radial engine, 213 kW (285 hp) each
- Propellers: 2-bladed variable-pitch propellers, 2.40 m (7 ft 10 in) diameter

Performance

- Maximum speed: 220 km/h (140 mph, 120 kn)
- Cruise speed: 175 km/h (109 mph, 94 kn) (65% power)
- Stall speed: 105 km/h (65 mph, 57 kn) (flaps down)
- Range: 995 km (618 mi, 537 nmi) (max fuel)
- Endurance: 7 hr 20 min
- Service ceiling: 4,000 m (13,000 ft)
- Rate of climb: 4.10 m/s (807 ft/min)
