= China Flying Dragon Aviation =

Chinese airline

IATA	ICAO	Call sign
FL	CFA	FEILONG
- Founded: 1981; 45 years ago
- Hubs: Harbin Taiping International Airport
- Headquarters: Harbin, Heilongjiang, China
- Website: www.chinafda.com.cn

China Flying Dragon Aviation
- Traditional Chinese: 中國飛龍專業航空公司
- Simplified Chinese: 中国飞龙专业航空公司
- Literal meaning: China Flying Dragon Professional Airlines Company
Transcriptions
Standard Mandarin
- Hanyu Pinyin: Zhōngguó Fēilóng Zhuānyè Hángkōng Gōngsī

China Flying Dragon Aviation (simplified Chinese: 中国飞龙专业航空公司; traditional Chinese: 中國飛龍專業航空公司; pinyin: Zhōngguó fēilóng zhuānyè hángkōng gōngsī) is an airline based in Harbin, Heilongjiang, China. It operates short-haul passenger and cargo charter flights, as well as maritime surveillance, aerial photography and forestry protection services. Its main base is Harbin Taiping International Airport.

== History ==
The airline was established and started operations in 1981. It is owned in a joint venture by the Harbin Aircraft Manufacturing Corporation and the former Ministry of Geology and Mineral Resources, now part of the Ministry of Natural Resources.

During the rescue and post-operations of the 2008 Sichuan earthquake, heavy equipment needed to be transported to deal with the dangerous formation of quake-lakes located in extremely difficult terrain, particularly at Tangjiashan mountain, which was accessible only by foot or air. A China Flying Dragon Special Aviation Company's Mi-26T heavy lift helicopter was used to bring heavy earth-moving tractors, fuel, and equipment to the affected location to create a sluice to relieve the dangerous quake-lake.

== Fleet ==
The China Flying Dragon Aviation fleet consists of the following aircraft (at August 2019):

- Air King 350ER
- Avicopter AC312
- AS350B2
- Cessna 172
- Diamond DA40
- Diamond DA42
- 11 Harbin Y-12 II
- Harbin Z-9
- Schweizer 300
- Comac C909

=== Previously operated ===
The airline also operated:

- 4 De Havilland Canada DHC-6 Twin Otter 300
- Bell 47
- Xian Y-7
- Shaanxi Y-8
- Changhe Z-11
- Beriev Be-103
- 1 Mil Mi-26T
- Mil Mi-8T
- Harbin Y-11
- Mil Mi-17
- Mil Mi-8
