= Skytech =

Aerospace company (Belgium)

Skytech Helicopters, Inc
- Company type: Private
- Industry: Aerospace
- Founded: 1989, Brussels, BE
- Headquarters: Brussels, Belgium
- Key people: Thierry Lakhanisky, CEO; Lucienne De Dryver, Vice Pres.
- Products: Commercial Helicopters
- Website: skytech-helicopters.com

Skytech Helicopters was a Belgian helicopter company operating heavy-lift helicopters in different countries. The company is known for pioneering commercial operation of the Mil MI 26T in Western Europe from 1992. As of the 3rd of October 2022 the company had filed for bankruptcy.

== History ==
Skytech SA was founded in Belgium in November 1989 by helicopter pilots Thierry Lakhanisky and Lucienne De Dryver.

First external load works were carried on with a single MD 500 helicopter; this light lifter was soon joined by a Mil MI 10K Harke-B under long term lease from the Aeroflot regional branch of the Republic of Komi. This MI 10K was used as a flying crane on various projects all over Europe, including building ski lifts up to 3,500 m on the Monte Rosa in the Alps.

The Belgian company introduced the first Mil MI 26T in South America in 1994 and in the same year set up partnerships with Nepal Airways to operate five Mil MI 17 helicopters in Nepal, and in Papua Niugini with Heli Niugini to operate a couple of Kamov 32 helicopters to support oil explorations with Barracuda Oil and Chevron Oil.

Since 2006, the family-owned company was largely involved in humanitarian support in Asia and signed a cooperation agreement with the Emercom, the Russian Ministry of Civil Protection to establish an alert base in Brussels South Charleroi Airport but the project was moved to north of France.

In 2008 the company first declared bankruptcy but was able to recover and had the declaration undone. Following the arrest of the CEO, Thierry Lakhanisky, for involvement in illegal arms trade with the Democratic Republic of the Congo on the 18th of September 2022 the company yet again filed for bankruptcy on the 3rd of October 2022.

== Heavy firefighting ==
Rostvertol, the MI 26T's manufacturer, teamed with Skytech in 1994 to produce a powerful fire fighting system for the world largest helicopters; the system, called Twin Bambi Buckets, was able to deliver 20.000 liters per drop and was manufactured in Canada by SEI.

The TBB was first operated commercially by Samsung Aerospace of South Korea under contract with Skytech SA in 1998, and on several governmental contracts in Turkey and Italy; in 2000 Skytech supplied at least three MI 26T for the Italian Civil Protection, operated as "state aircraft" for the firefighting season.

== Fleet ==
The fleet size is variable: the company has operated Ka 32T, KA 32S, MI 26T, MI 10K, MI 8MTV, MI 8AMT, MI 171, B 206, MD 500. At least three MI 26T were at one time based in Belgium but are no more active. Several MI 17 bearing Skytech titles were spotted in Yemen and Bosnia from 2000. The company is known to operate on undisclosed governmental programs.

== Media ==
The company’s helicopters appeared in several films:

- "Operation Okavango" - Nicolas Hulot
- "Ushuaia" - Nicolas Hulot
- "Massive Machines" - Chris Barrie
- "Greatest Ever" Discovery Channel

== See also ==
Russian Helicopters JSC
