= Changhai County =

Changhai 长海县
- County
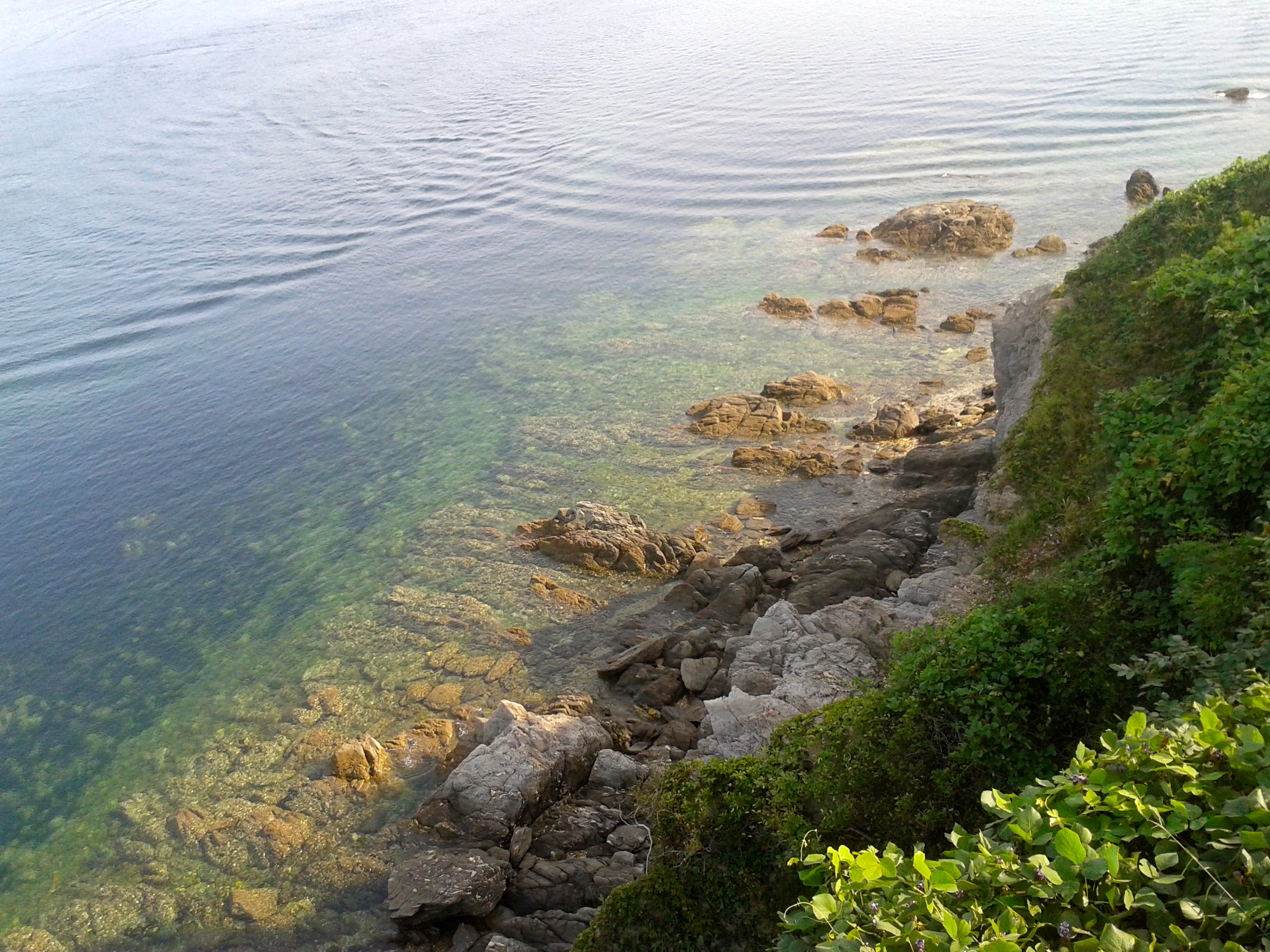
- Xiaoshuikou (小水口) Scenic Area in Xiaochangshan Island

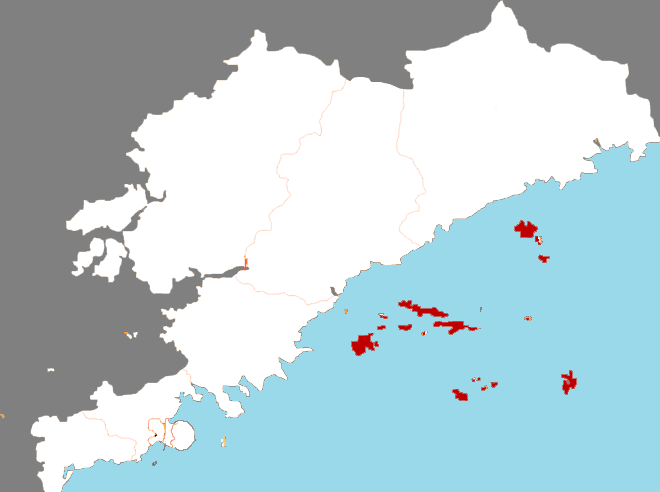
- Location of Changhai County in Dalian

- Location in Liaoning
- Coordinates: 39°16′19″N 122°35′42″E
- Country: People's Republic of China
- Province: Liaoning
- Sub-provincial city: Dalian
- Seat: No. 1 Changhai Square, Dachangshandao (大长山岛镇长海广场1号)

Area
  - Total: 156.89 km^{2} (60.58 sq mi)

Population (2020)
  - Total: 66,824
  - Density: 425.93/km^{2} (1,103.2/sq mi)
- Time zone: UTC+8 (China Standard)
- Postal code: 116500
- Division code: 210224
- Website: www.changhai.dl.gov.cn

Changhai County (Chinese: 长海县; pinyin: Chánghǎi Xiàn; lit. 'Long-Sea County') is a county under the administration of Dalian, Liaoning province, China. It consists of several islands in the Yellow Sea and is located offshore of the Liaodong Peninsula. There are 112 small islands and reefs in the county, traditionally called the Outer Long Mountains Island Chain (Chinese: 外长山群岛; pinyin: Wàichángshān Qúndǎo). The county has an area of 156.89 square kilometres (60.58 sq mi) and a permanent population as of 2010 of 77,951, making it Dalian's least populous county-level division, and the county government is located in the Dongshan neighborhood of the town of Dachangshandao (Chinese: 大长山岛; lit. 'Great Long-Mountain Island').

== Administrative divisions ==
There are 5 towns in the county.

Towns:

- Dachangshandao (大长山岛镇)
- Zhangzidao (獐子岛镇)
- Guangludao (广鹿岛镇)
- Xiaochangshandao (小长山岛镇)
- Haiyangdao (海洋岛镇)

== Demographics ==
Census	Population
2000	99,532
2010	77,951
2020	66,824

== Climate ==
Climate data for Changhai, elevation 36 m (118 ft), (1991–2020 normals, extremes 1981–present)
Month	Jan	Feb	Mar	Apr	May	Jun	Jul	Aug	Sep	Oct	Nov	Dec	Year
Record high °C (°F)	9.5 (49.1)	11.3 (52.3)	17.8 (64.0)	22.3 (72.1)	30.1 (86.2)	34.5 (94.1)	35.4 (95.7)	37.1 (98.8)	31.7 (89.1)	26.4 (79.5)	19.4 (66.9)	13.0 (55.4)	37.1 (98.8)
Mean daily maximum °C (°F)	−0.4 (31.3)	1.8 (35.2)	6.6 (43.9)	12.7 (54.9)	18.4 (65.1)	22.0 (71.6)	25.5 (77.9)	27.1 (80.8)	24.1 (75.4)	17.7 (63.9)	9.6 (49.3)	2.3 (36.1)	13.9 (57.1)
Daily mean °C (°F)	−3.7 (25.3)	−1.4 (29.5)	3.1 (37.6)	9.0 (48.2)	14.4 (57.9)	18.7 (65.7)	22.6 (72.7)	24.3 (75.7)	21.1 (70.0)	14.6 (58.3)	6.4 (43.5)	−0.9 (30.4)	10.7 (51.2)
Mean daily minimum °C (°F)	−6.3 (20.7)	−4.1 (24.6)	0.5 (32.9)	6.1 (43.0)	11.6 (52.9)	16.3 (61.3)	20.5 (68.9)	22.2 (72.0)	18.6 (65.5)	11.9 (53.4)	3.5 (38.3)	−3.7 (25.3)	8.1 (46.6)
Record low °C (°F)	−21.7 (−7.1)	−18.1 (−0.6)	−9.7 (14.5)	−1.0 (30.2)	4.6 (40.3)	9.2 (48.6)	14.7 (58.5)	15.3 (59.5)	9.4 (48.9)	−0.4 (31.3)	−12.5 (9.5)	−15.6 (3.9)	−21.7 (−7.1)
Average precipitation mm (inches)	4.4 (0.17)	9.2 (0.36)	13.1 (0.52)	35.0 (1.38)	55.3 (2.18)	79.2 (3.12)	128.0 (5.04)	161.6 (6.36)	55.1 (2.17)	31.6 (1.24)	28.2 (1.11)	9.1 (0.36)	609.8 (24.01)
Average precipitation days (≥ 0.1 mm)	2.8	3.1	3.4	6.2	7.7	8.8	10.7	8.5	5.5	5.5	5.1	3.4	70.7
Average snowy days	4.1	3.1	2.1	0.5	0	0	0	0	0	0.1	1.6	3.4	14.9
Average relative humidity (%)	57	60	63	67	73	85	89	85	73	64	61	58	70
Mean monthly sunshine hours	211.1	195.8	239.0	243.1	258.8	211.0	189.6	225.7	241.3	226.4	186.1	192.2	2,620.1
Percentage possible sunshine	70	64	64	61	58	47	42	54	65	66	63	66	60
Source: China Meteorological Administrationall-time extreme temperatureall-time May high

== Transport ==
- Changhai Dachangshandao Airport
