= Changhai Dachangshandao Airport =

Airport in Liaoning, China

Changhai Dachangshandao Airport 长海大长山岛机场
- IATA: CNI; ICAO: ZYCH

Summary
- Airport type: Public
- Operator: Dalian Zhoushuizi International Airport Co., Ltd.
- Serves: Changhai, Liaoning, China
- Opened: 2 February 2008; 18 years ago
- Built: November 1988; 37 years ago
- Coordinates: 39°15′59″N 122°40′01″E

Map
- Location of airport in Liaoning

Runways
Direction	Length		Surface
Direction	m	ft	Surface
17/35	800	2,625	Concrete

Statistics (2022)
- Passengers: 2765
- Aircraft movements: 535

Changhai Dachangshandao Airport
- Simplified Chinese: 长海大长山岛机场
- Traditional Chinese: 長海大長山島機場
Transcriptions
Standard Mandarin
- Hanyu Pinyin: Chánghǎi Dàchángshāndǎo Jīchǎng

Changhai Dachangshandao Airport (IATA: CNI, ICAO: ZYCH) is an airport serving Changhai, in the province of Liaoning in the People's Republic of China.

== Airlines and destinations ==
The airport has one daily flight to Dalian Zhoushuizi International Airport. In peak times, like holidays, an additional flight to Dalian Zhoushuizi will be provided.

Airlines	Destinations
China Flying Dragon Aviation	Dalian

== Facilities ==
The airport has one runway which is 850 metres (2,789 ft) long. The terminal has traditional ticketing and baggage claim areas. Security checks often proceed on the tarmac, but can also be done inside the terminal in specially marked areas.
