= Hafei Aviation =

Chinese aircraft manufacturer

Hafei Aviation Industry Co Ltd.
- Type: Private
- Industry: Aerospace
- Headquarters: Harbin, Heilongjiang Province, China
- Parent: Harbin Aircraft Industry Group
- Website: hafei.com

Hafei Aviation Industry Co Ltd (Chinese: 哈飞航空工业股份有限公司) (SSE: 600038) is a Chinese manufacturer of light airplanes, helicopters and aerospace parts. While located in Harbin, Heilongjiang Province the company also has a presence in Beijing.

Hafei Aviation is a publicly traded subsidiary of the Harbin Aviation Industry (Group) Co Ltd, a company that also has a joint venture with Airbus to make A320 composite materials components and work on the A350 XWB.
