= Harbin Aircraft Industry Group =

Chinese aerospace manufacturer

- Company type: Subsidiary
- Industry: Aerospace, Defence
- Founded: 1952; 74 years ago
- Headquarters: Harbin, Heilongjiang, China
- Key people: Guo Dianman (Chairman)
- Products: Military aircraft, Helicopters, Utility aircraft
- Number of employees: 6700
- Parent: Aviation Industry Corporation of China
- Website: hafei.com

Harbin Aircraft Industry Group Co., Ltd.
- Simplified Chinese: 哈尔滨飞机工业集团有限责任公司
- Traditional Chinese: 哈爾濱飛機工業集團有限責任公司
Transcriptions
Standard Mandarin
- Hanyu Pinyin: Hā'ěrbīn Fēijī Gōngyè Jítuán Yǒuxiàn Zérèn Gōngsī

Harbin Aircraft Industry (Group) Co., Ltd. (HAIG), often shortened to Hafei (Chinese: 哈飞; pinyin: Hāfēi), is an aircraft manufacturing company headquartered in Pingfang District, Harbin, Heilongjiang province, China. It was previously called Harbin Aircraft Manufacturing Corporation (HAMC) in English.

The company was founded in 1952 to manufacture planes for domestic sales, but today it supplies various components for foreign aerospace companies. It is a subsidiary of the Aviation Industry Corporation of China (AVIC).

A former subsidiary of Harbin Aircraft Manufacturing Corporation — Hafei Motor, was one of the major automobile manufactures in China.

== History ==
The 1st factory opened in 1952 to repair aircraft and situated on the former site of the Manchuria Airplane Manufacturing Company (Manshū/Mansyuu) factory. In 1958, it began producing licensed copies of Soviet aircraft. It produced the Z-5, the Mil Mi-4 helicopter, and the H-5 light bomber — a copy of the Ilyushin Il-28.

It then produced the Harbin Y-11 a light twin-engined utility aircraft — an aircraft of its own design and not a licensed copy. The Harbin Y-12 which followed, while similar to the Y-11, was a largely new aircraft.

The most recent and important product is the Z-20 utility helicopter designed and built for the Chinese military.

== Subsidiaries ==
- Hafei Aviation, a manufacturer of light airplanes, helicopters and aerospace parts.
- Hafei Motors, defunct producer of automobile engines; sedans; MPVs; and mini vehicles, small trucks and vans that see commercial use. Subsidiaries include the auto-making Hafei Motor Co Ltd and the engine maker Harbin Dongan Auto Engine Co.

== Major products ==
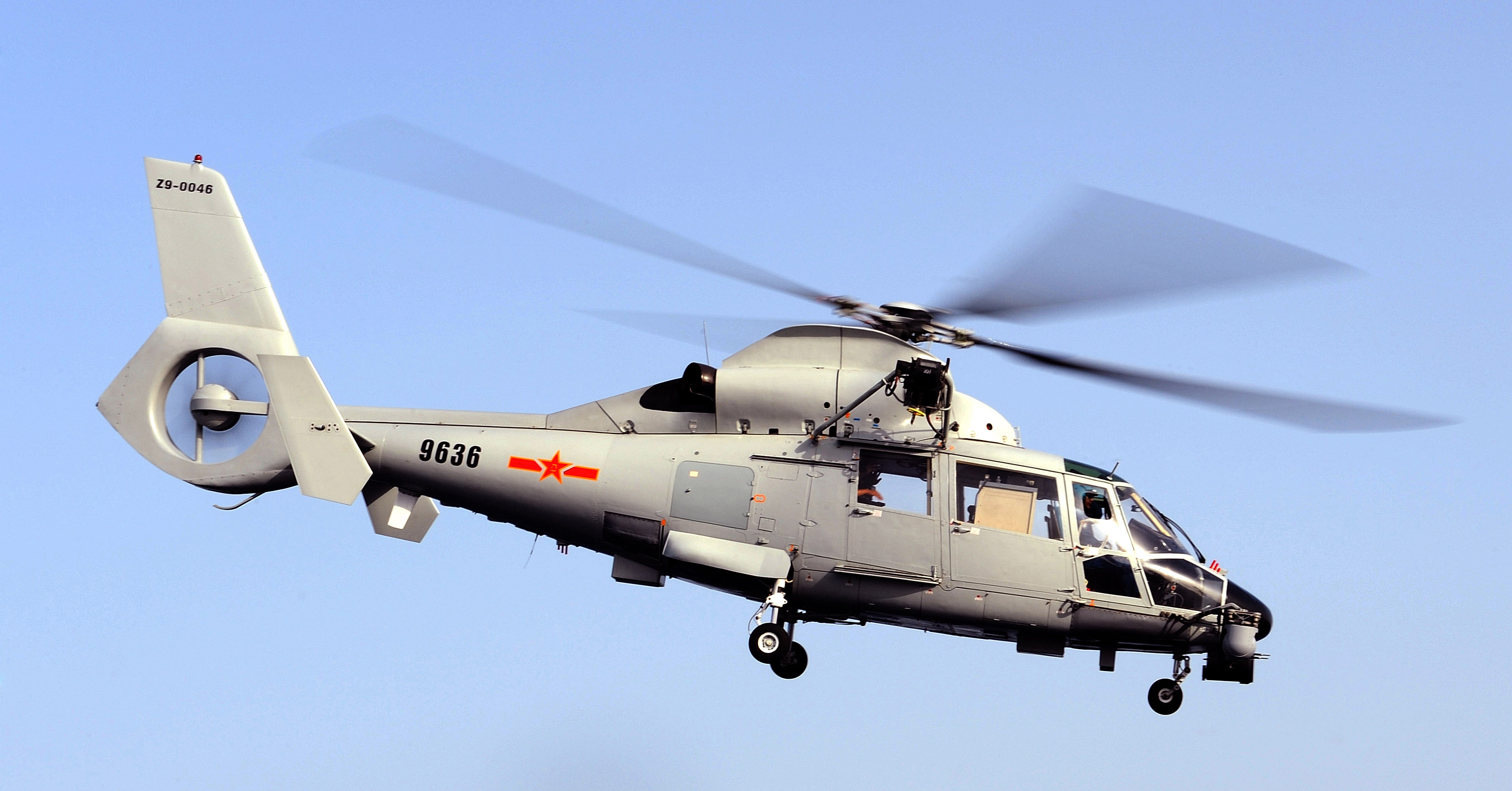
Harbin Z-9

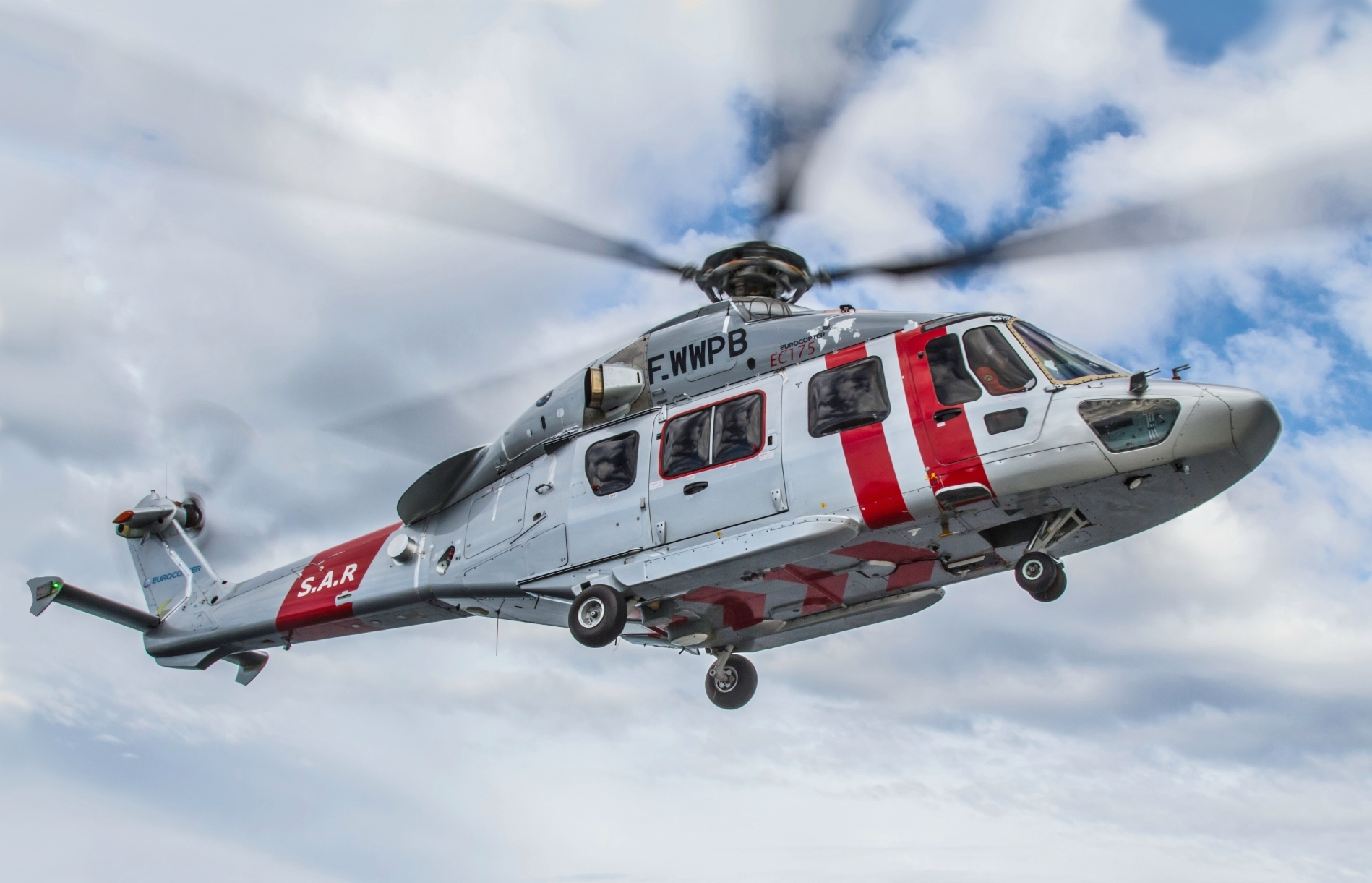
Harbin Z-15

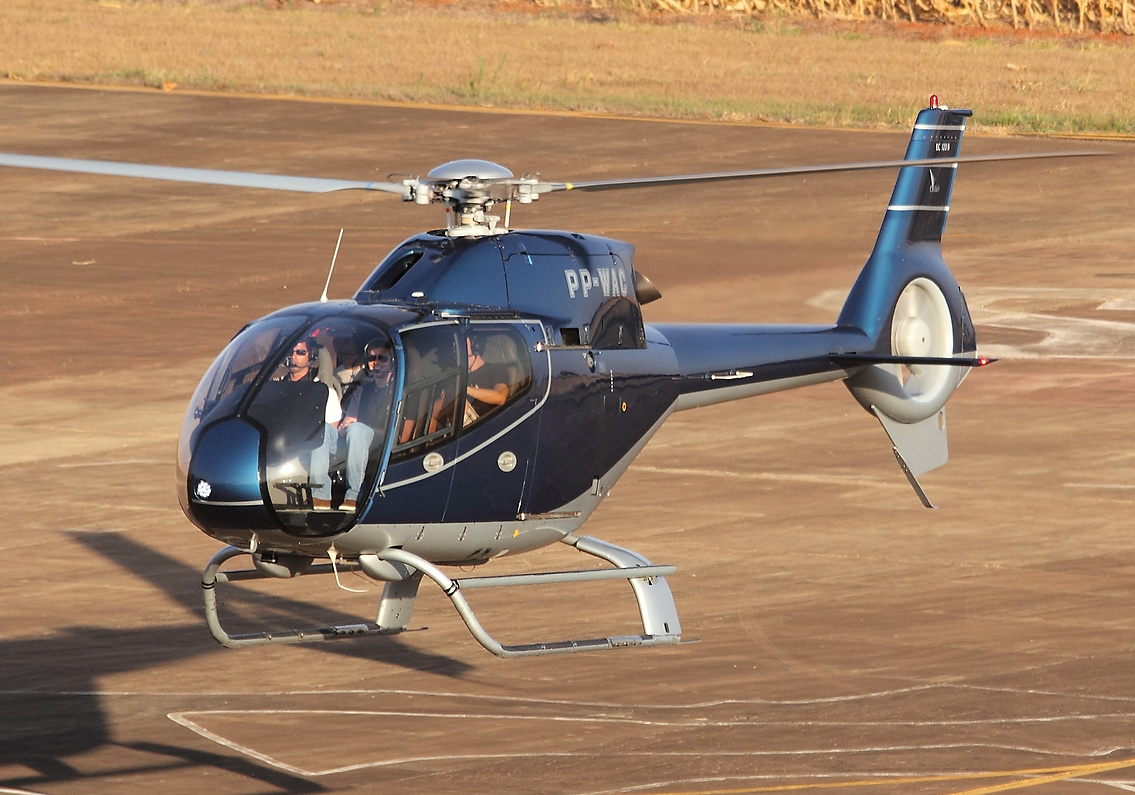
HC-120/EC120

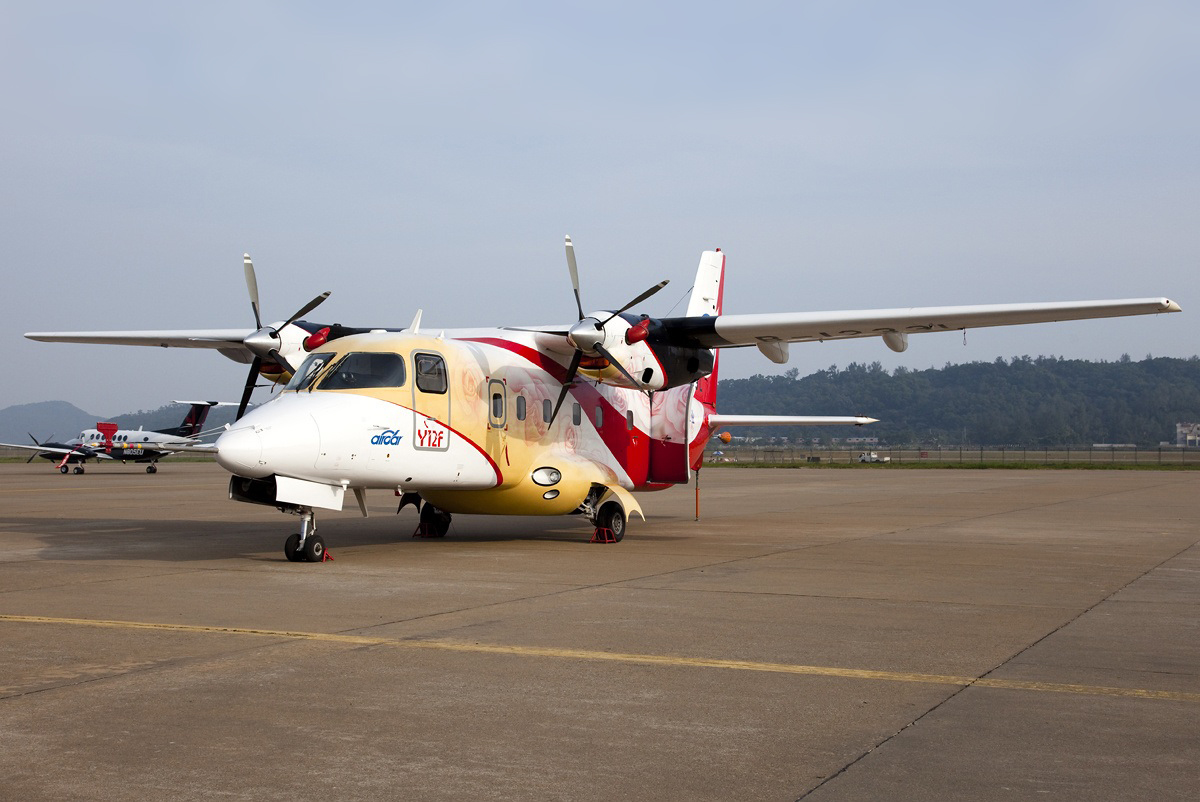
Harbin Y-12F

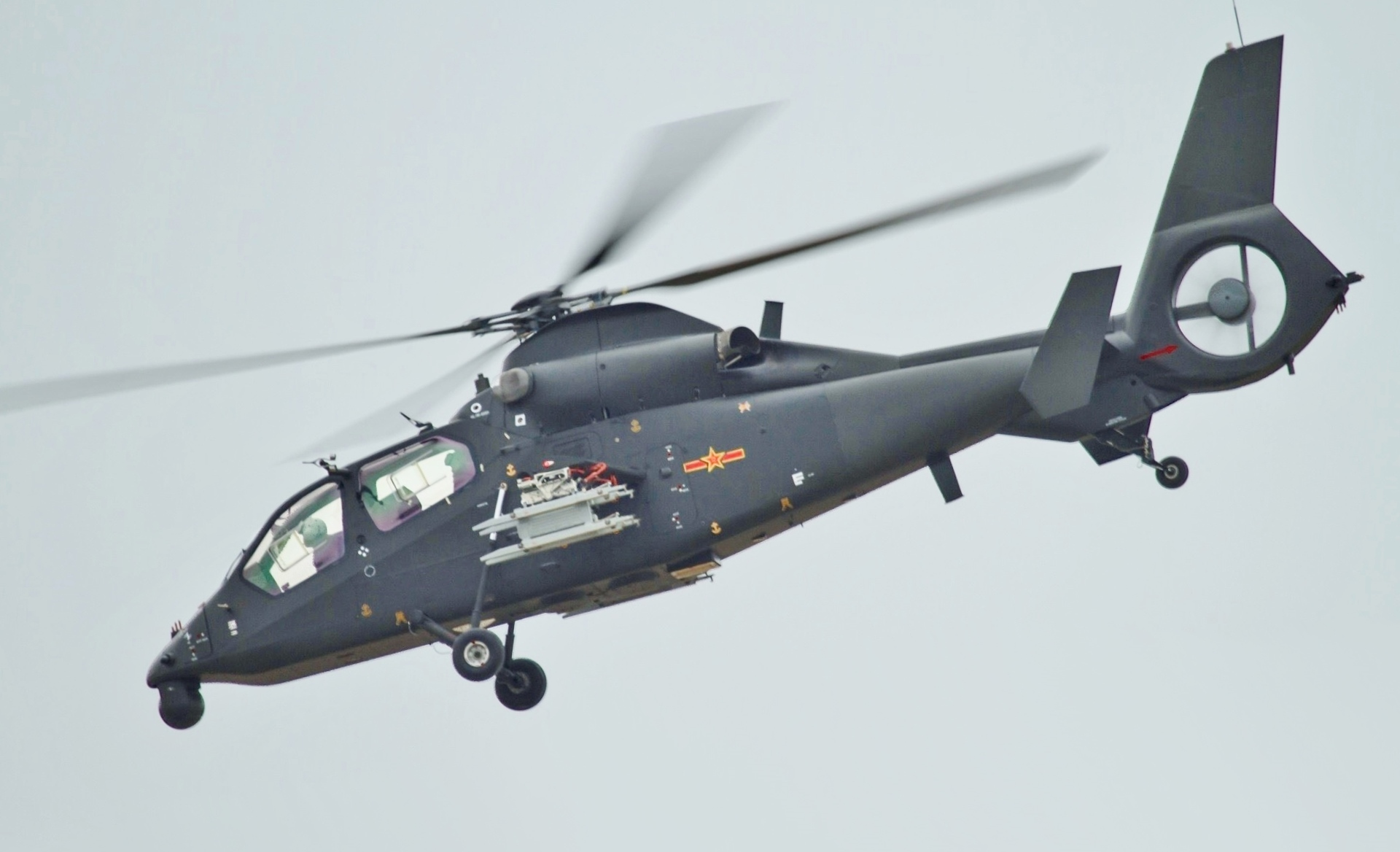
Harbin Z-19

Helicopters

- Harbin Z-5 - Chinese variant of the Mil Mi-4 transport helicopter
- Harbin/CHDRI Z-6 - turboshaft re-design of the Z-5
- Harbin Z-9 - medium-weight multipurpose twin-engine helicopter - Chinese variant of the Eurocopter Dauphin
  - Harbin Z-9W/G - attack helicopter
- Harbin Z-19 - reconnaissance and attack helicopter
- Harbin Z-20 - a new 10-ton utility helicopter for the PLA Air Force, army and navy. Similar specifications to Sikorsky UH-60 Black Hawk.
- Harbin Z-21
- Harbin Z-15/EC175 - medium utility helicopter, joint-developed with Eurocopter
- HC-120/EC120 - joint-developed with Eurocopter and Singapore Technologies Aerospace, Ltd.

Bombers

- Harbin H-5 - Chinese variant of the Ilyushin Il-28 bomber
- Harbin SH-5 - amphibious bomber
- HongDian-5 - ECM version of Harbin H-5, being replaced

Patrol/Utility aircraft

- Harbin PS-5 - Patrol Anti-submarine seaplane version of Harbin SH-5
- Harbin Y-11 - high wing twin-engine piston utility aircraft

Transports

- Harbin Y-12 - utility STOL transport and variant of the Harbin Y-11

Unmanned Aerial Vehicles (UAV)

- Harbin BZK-005

Former production

- ERJ 145 - in a joint venture with Embraer
- Embraer Legacy 650 - in a joint venture with Embraer
