= Yermolayev =

Yermolayev (Russian: Ермолаев, Ukrainian: Єрмолаєв, masculine) and Yermolayeva (Russian: Ермолаева; feminine) is an East Slavic patronymic surname. Yermolayev is derived from the given name Yermolay (or Ermolai, Ermolay, Yermolai; Russian: Ермолай), which was from the Greek Hermolaos, meaning "the people of Hermes".

"Yermolayev" may also be romanized as Ermolaeff, Ermolaev, Ermolajew, Ermolayev, Iermolaïev, Jermolajeff, Jermolajev, Jermolajew, Yermolaeff, Yermolaev, Yermolaieff, Yermolaiev, or Yermolaiew.

Notable people with this surname include:

- Aleksey Yermolayev (1910–1975), Soviet ballet dancer
- Galina Yermolayeva, multiple persons
- Nikita Ermolaev
- Vadim Yermolayev, Russian ice hockey player
- Vadym Iermolaiev
- Vera Ermolaeva
- Vladimir Yermolaev (1909–1944), Soviet aircraft designer
- Yelizaveta Yermolayeva

== See also ==
- Yermolaev Design Bureau
- Yermolayev Yer-2
