= Bartini T-117 =

General information
- Type: Transport
- National origin: USSR
- Manufacturer: OOS (Otdel Opytnogo Samolyetostroeniya - section for experimental aircraft construction)
- Designer: Roberto L. Bartini
- Number built: 1 (not completed)

The Bartini T-117 was a twin-engined cargo aircraft designed by Robert Ludvigovich Bartini in the USSR from 1944-1948.

== Development ==
From 1944 to 1948 Bartini devoted much effort to the development of the T-117 heavy transport aircraft. Work on the project started whilst Bartini was working at TsKB 29 NKVD as a detainee. Initially designated P-7, the aircraft, designed in both passenger and cargo versions, was a high-wing monoplane with triple vertical tails powered by two Shvetsov ASh-73 18-cylinder radial engines, with take-off rating of 1,700 kW (2,300 hp).

A peculiarity of the project was the fuselage of elliptical cross-section with the larger axis horizontal. The basic assault transport version was designed to carry a load of 8,000 kg (18,000 lb), carrying self-propelled guns, lorries, motorcycles, mortars, artillery pieces of up to 122 mm (4.80 in) calibre and other items loaded through a rear cargo hatch with detachable loading ramps. Because of the wide fuselage, it was possible to transport two GAZ-67 jeeps side by side. Alternatively, 80 troops could be carried on 4 lengthwise rows of seats. There were several passenger versions with different cabin layouts, allowing the carriage of up to 50 passengers over a distance of 1,600 km (990 mi) at a cruising speed of 365 km/h (197 kn; 227 mph).

Construction of a prototype started in 1946, but in 1948 work was halted due to a shortage of ASh-7 engines which were needed for the Tupolev Tu-4 strategic bomber, which had been given priority on the personal directive of Joseph Stalin. There were several projected variants of the T-117 with alternative powerplants, including the Shvetsov ASh-82FN, the experimental Shvetsov ASh-2 four-row radial and the 3,600 kW (4,800 hp) Klimov VK-2 turboprop, but this did not save the project. The uncompleted T-117 prototype never had engines fitted and was scrapped.

== Specifications ==
Data from The Osprey Encyclopedia of Russian Aircraft 1875–1995

General characteristics

- Crew: 4
- Capacity: 80 passengers
- Wingspan: 35 m (114 ft 10 in)
- Wing area: 128 m^{2} (1,380 sq ft)
- Empty weight: 11,800 kg (26,015 lb)
- Max takeoff weight: 25,000 kg (55,116 lb)
- Powerplant: 2 × Shvetsov ASh-73 18-cylinder air-cooled radial engine, 1,900 kW (2,600 hp) each

Performance

- Cruise speed: 540 km/h (340 mph, 290 kn)
- Service ceiling: 12,000 m (39,000 ft)

== See also ==
- Antonov An-8
- Bartini Stal-6
- Bartini Stal-7
- Bartini Beriev VVA-14
