= BE8 =

BE8 or BE-8 may refer to:

- Beryllium-8 (Be-8 or ^{8}Be), an isotope of beryllium
- Brazilian destroyer escort Bocaina (BE-8), formerly USS Marts
- Beriev Be-8, a 1947 Soviet aircraft
- An endianness mode for the ARM architecture
- The index number for The Nose Book in the Beginner Books collection
