= MS5 =

MS5, or similar, may refer to:

- Beriev MS-5, a Soviet flying boat
- Matra MS5, a racing car
- Metal Slug 5, a video game
- Mississippi's 5th congressional district
- Mississippi Highway 5
- Manga Studio 5, comics and manga creation software
- Season 5 of the American TV show The Masked Singer
