= N40 =

N40 may refer to:

== Roads ==
- N40 road (Ireland)
- N-40 National Highway in Pakistan
- Nebraska Highway 40, in the United States

== Other ==
- N40 (Long Island bus)
- Benign prostatic hyperplasia
- BMW N40, an automobile engine
- Naughty Forty, a football hooligan firm linked to Stoke City F.C.
- Sky Manor Airport (New Jersey), in Hunterdon County, New Jersey, United States
- Toyota Hilux (N40), a Japanese pickup truck
- IBM RISC System/6000 N40, a laptop; see IBM RS/6000 § Type 7007
