= T117 =

T117 or variation, may refer to:

== Vehicles ==
- Bartini T-117, a Soviet World War II cargo aircraft
- FMC T117, a steel-based prototype version of the M113 armored personnel carrier
- Talus MB-H amphibious tractor T 117
- HMS Morris Dance (T117), a British Royal Navy World War II Dance-class trawler
- Soviet minesweeper T-117, a World War II Lend-Lease ship; formerly the Admirable-class minesweeper USS Arch (AM-144)

== Places ==
- Terengganu State Route T117, Malaysia; a highway
- Põhimaantee 117 (T117), Estonian national route 117; see Estonian national road 1

== Other uses ==
- KHD T117, an aero-engine; see List of aircraft engines
- UNISOC T117, a computer chip; see List of UNISOC processors
- T117, a bus route in Kuala Lumpur, Malaysia; see List of bus routes in Greater Kuala Lumpur

== See also ==
- Type 117 inshore minesweeper of the Yugoslav Navy; see List of ships of the Yugoslav Navy
- Peugeot Type 117, an automobile; see List of Peugeot vehicles
- Blériot Aéronautique Type 117 escort fighter, a French Interwar airplane
- 117 (disambiguation)
- T17 (disambiguation)
