= Beriev Be-103 =

Russian flying boat

Be-103
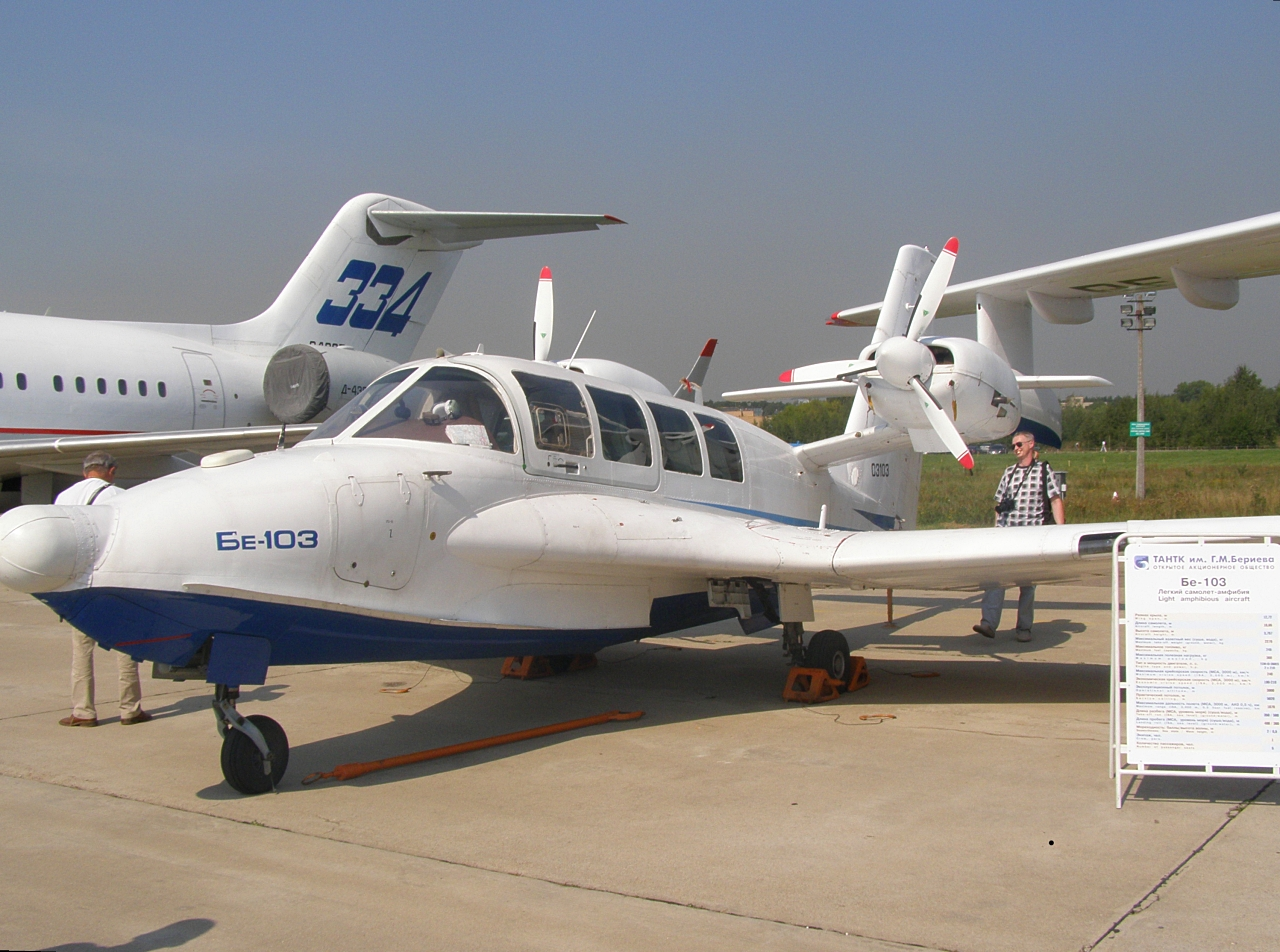

General information
- Type: Amphibian
- Designer: Beriev
- Built by: KnAAPO
- Status: In production

History
- Introduction date: 2003
- First flight: 15 July 1997

The Beriev Be-103 (in English sometimes called "Snipe") is an amphibious seaplane designed by Beriev and constructed by the Komsomolsk-on-Amur Aircraft Production Association (KnAAPO) in Russia. Intended for autonomous operation in the unmarked areas of Russia's far north and Siberia, the Be-103 was designed for short-haul routes in regions that have rivers, lakes and streams, but are otherwise inaccessible.

== Design and development ==
The Be-103 is a mid-wing monoplane, making use of the modified wing roots as water-displacing sponsons. It features an all-moving slab tail and retractable tricycle landing gear for land operations. Its hallmark and most distinguishing design feature is the water-displacing wing, an unusual feature for a seaplane, with three aquaplaning implements (planing step, port and starboard wing trailing edges) which substantially enhance the aircraft's on-the-water stability and seaworthiness.

The Be-103 features include an advanced, blended wing, swept at 22°, with 11-foot (3.4 m)-long fixed leading edge slats, trailing-link main landing gear, and three-bladed MT-12 reverse pitch propellers. Fuel is stored in the wet wings. The aircraft is built from aluminium-lithium alloy with titanium used in high-stress areas. A 30-parameter, five-hour flight data recorder, engine fire-detection systems and an ice detector are also standard, as are hydraulic brakes. However, unlike most modern aircraft, the Be-103 is not equipped with wing flaps.

When flying solo, ballast must be placed near the right front seat due to center of gravity issues.

=== Certification ===
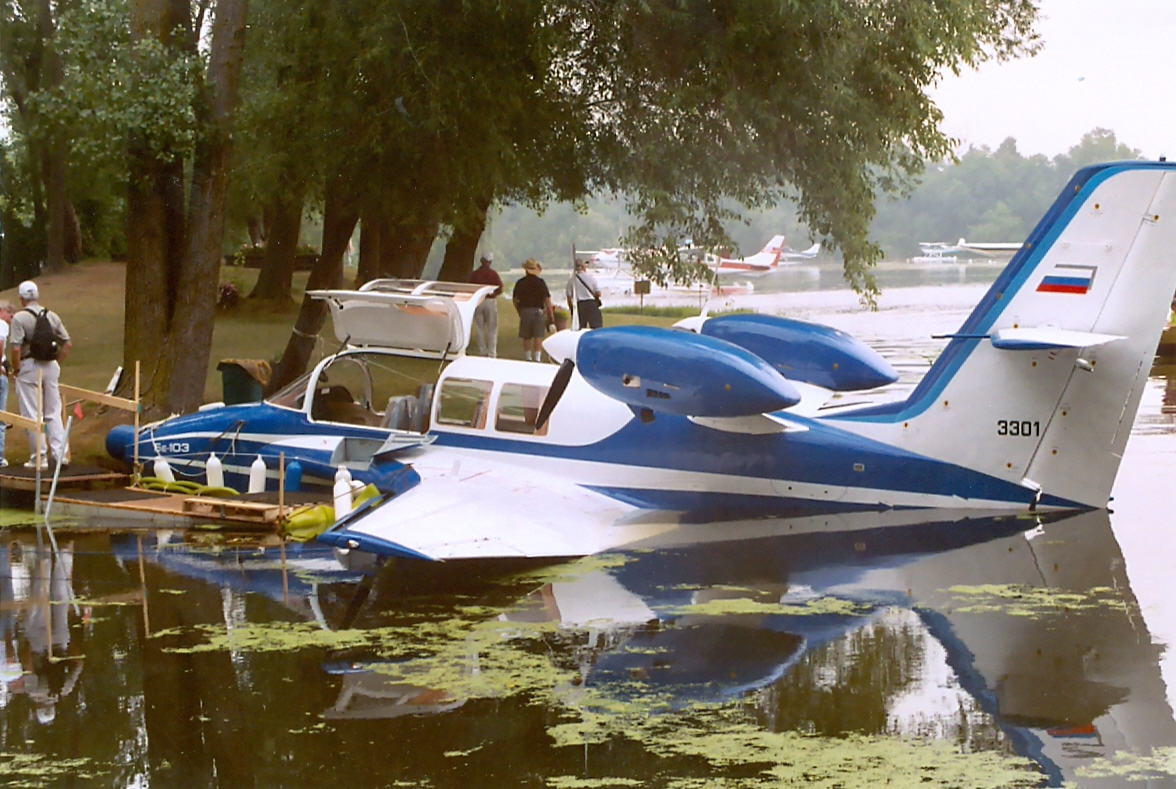
Be 103

The Be-103 received its Federal Aviation Administration type certification on 21 July 2003 at the EAA AirVenture airshow in Oshkosh, Wisconsin US, where the aircraft had arrived via An-124 airlift. The type certificate was handed over by the FAA's co-chairman of regulations and certification, Nicholas Sabatini. The aircraft is also certified in Brazil, the People's Republic of China, the European Union, and Russia.

On 1 August 2003, FAA Director Marion Blakey visited the Be-103's display area at the exhibition in order to familiarize herself personally with the aircraft and to meet representatives of the developer, manufacturer and Air Register.

The obtaining of FAA certification allows official sales of the Be-103 in Canada and the US. After the exhibition, the first production Be-103 aircraft were officially handed over to its American dealer, Kent Linn of Sky Manor Airport in Pittstown, New Jersey.

== Operators ==
As of 2010, three aircraft were on the United States civil register. In 2004 China signed a US$20 million contract with KnAAPO for the delivery of 20 aircraft. In 2016 contract was signed between Taganrog-based Beriev Aircraft Company and the Chinese Energy Leader Aircraft Manufacturing to start licensed production of Beriev Be-103 in China.

- China Flying Dragon Aviation

== Variants ==
Be-103
Twin-engine light utility amphibian aircraft, seating one pilot and five passengers.
SA-20P
Eight-seat version powered by single VOKEM M14X radial engine; one prototype.

== Specifications (Be-103) ==
Data from

General characteristics

- Crew: 1 (Pilot)
- Capacity: 5 passengers or 545 kilograms (1,202 lb) cargo
- Length: 10.7 m (34 ft 11 in)
- Wingspan: 12.5 m (41 ft 9 in)
- Height: 3.7 m (12 ft 4 in)
- Wing area: 25.1 m^{2} (270.2 sq ft)
- Empty weight: 1,730 kg (3,810 lb)
- Gross weight: 2,283 kg (5,033 lb)
- Max takeoff weight: 2,270 kg (5,011 lb)
- Fuel capacity: 340 litres (90 US gal)
- Powerplant: 2 × Continental IO-360-ES4 fuel-injected Horizontally flat engines, 157 kW (210 hp) each
- Propellers: 3-bladed MT-Propeller MT-12, 1.83 m (6 ft 0 in) diameter

Performance

- Cruise speed: 235 km/h (145 mph, 127 kn)
- Stall speed: 111 km/h (70 mph, 60 kn)
- Never exceed speed: 241 km/h (150 mph, 130 kn)
- Minimum control speed: 115 km/h (71 mph, 62 kn)
- Range: 845 km (525 mi, 460 nmi)
- Service ceiling: 5,000 m (16,400 ft)
- Wing loading: 90.3 kg/m^{2} (18.5 lb/sq ft)
- Power/mass: 11.9lb/hp (7.2 kg/kW)

== See also ==
Aircraft of comparable role, configuration, and era

- Lake Renegade

Related lists

- List of flying boats and floatplanes
