= Yermolaev Design Bureau =

Yermolaev Design Bureau was a Soviet OKB (design bureau) formed in 1939 around Vladimir Yermolaev. After his death in on 31 December 1944, it was absorbed into the Sukhoi OKB in March 1945.

== Aircraft ==
- Yermolaev Yer-2

== Bibliography ==
- Gunston, Bill (1995). The Encyclopedia of Russian Aircraft 1875–1995. Osceola, Wisconsin: Motorbooks International. ISBN 0-7603-0027-5.
