= MP2 =

MP2 or MP-2 may refer to:

== Aviation ==
- The second terminal of Marseille Provence Airport
- Chyetverikov ARK-3 flying-boat

== Firearms ==
- German Army designation for the Uzi
- MP-2 machine pistol

== Science ==
- MP 2, an abbreviation for a zone during the Paleocene
- Møller–Plesset perturbation theory of the second order, a method in the field of computational chemistry

== Technology ==
=== File formats ===
- MPEG-1 Audio Layer II, a lossy audio compression format
- MPEG-2, a video encoding standard

=== Video games ===
- Mario Party 2, a 1999 party game for the Nintendo 64 and the second game for the console
- Max Payne 2: The Fall of Max Payne, a 2003 shooter game
- Metroid Prime 2: Echoes, a 2004 action-adventure game
