= Chetverikov ARK-4 =

Multi-role flying boat

ARK-4

General information
- Type: Arctic Multi-role Flying Boat
- National origin: USSR
- Manufacturer: Chyetverikov
- Designer: Igor Vyacheslavovich Chyetverikov
- Number built: 1

History
- First flight: 1936

The ARK-4 was a single-engine Soviet flying boat design produced by Chyetverikov.

== Specifications ==
General characteristics

- Crew: 5
- Length: 14.6 m (47 ft 11 in)
- Wingspan: 20 m (65 ft 7 in)
- Wing area: 59.5 m^{2} (640 sq ft)
- Empty weight: 3,642 kg (8,029 lb)
- Gross weight: 5,600 kg (12,346 lb)
- Powerplant: 2 × Shvetsov M-25V 9-cylinder air-cooled radial piston engines, 560 kW (750 hp) each

Performance

- Maximum speed: 320 km/h (200 mph, 170 kn)
- Range: 1,500 km (930 mi, 810 nmi)
- Service ceiling: 8,500 m (27,900 ft)
- Rate of climb: 4.76 m/s (937 ft/min)

Armament

- Guns:

1 x machine gun in a manually operated bow turret
1 x machine-gun in a dorsal sliding hatch

- Bombs: 1,000 kg (2,200 lb) of bombs

== See also ==
- Chyetverikov ARK-3
