= Robert Bartini =

Soviet aircraft designer (1897–1974)

- Роберт Бартини
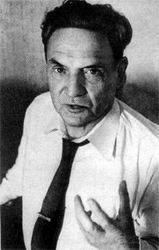
- Born: Róbert Orosdy (de Orosd et Bö); 14 May 1897; Fiume, Kingdom of Hungary Austro-Hungarian Empire (modern-day Croatia)
- Died: 6 December 1974 (aged 77); Moscow, Soviet Union
- Resting place: Vvedenskoye Cemetery
- Parent: Lajos Orosdy (Hungarian name order Orosdy Lajos)
- Engineering career
- Discipline: Aeronautical Engineering
- Awards: Order of Lenin

Robert Ludvigovich Bartini (Russian: Роберт Людвигович Бартини; 14 May 1897 – 6 December 1974) was a Soviet aircraft designer and scientist, involved in the development of numerous successful and experimental aircraft projects. A pioneer of amphibious aircraft and ground-effect vehicles, Bartini was one of the most famous engineers in the Soviet Union, nicknamed Barone Rosso (Italian for 'Red Baron') because of his rumored noble Italian ancestry.

== Biography ==
=== Early life ===
Robert Bartini was born on 14 May 1897, in Fiume, Kingdom of Hungary, Austro-Hungarian Empire (now Rijeka, Croatia).

He gave widely varying accounts of his parents' identity. In a 2020 biography, Sergej Težak stated that it was "still quite unclear" who Bartini's parents were and where he was from. He evidently grew up in Austria-Hungary at Fiume (now Rijeka, Croatia) or Miskolc, or both. His father was apparently a member of a Hungarian aristocratic family, although Bartini's comments make it unclear which of two brothers named Orosdy was his father. His mother may have been named Bartini and of Italian noble origins. In other accounts, however, Bartini stated that his surname came from his father. And when questioned by the NKVD in 1938, Bartini stated that he had been born in Kanjiza, Kingdom of Hungary (modern-day Serbia) that his mother's surname was Fersel and that his father was an Austrian nobleman named Formaha. According to other sources, he was born in Nagykanizsa, Hungary (may have been confused with Kanjiza, as both town was colloquially called "Kanizsa" in Hungarian) and his mother was called Maria Ferlesch, born in Villach.

Most often, Bartini claimed to have been the son of an unmarried 17-year-old woman of noble origins, and that his mother had drowned herself shortly after his birth when his father, a married man, refused to recognise him as his son. Bartini claimed that his father was named Ludovico (Hungarian: Lajos) Orosdy, a baron of the Austro-Hungarian nobility. Contrary to a claim by Bartini, Ludovico Orosdy was not the Lieutenant Governor of Fiume, and the circumstances suggest that his father may have been Ludovico's brother, Phillippe (Fülöp) Orosdy. Members of the Orosdy family suggest that Ludovico and Phillippe's paternal grandfather had been named Adolf Schnabel, and had adopted the surname Orosdy in 1848, after earlier converting from Judaism to Catholicism in Pest (in 1826). Philippe (Fülöp) Orosdy was made a baron in 1905. As an infant, Bartini was fostered by a family from the city of Miskolc. Most accounts state that despite their noble background, Bartini's biological relatives were impoverished and that his foster parents were peasants.

Bartini graduated from gymnasium in 1915, and upon the outbreak of the First World War was conscripted into the Austro-Hungarian Army and sent to an officers' reserve school in Besztercebánya (now Banská Bystrica, Slovakia). Upon graduation in 1916, Bartini was sent to the Eastern Front where he was captured by Russian troops in June 1916 and detained at a prisoner of war camp in near Khabarovsk in the Russian Far East. He remained at the camp for the remainder of the war and was eventually released in 1920. Bartini returned home to find administration of Fiume being fought over by the local Italian and Croat populaces, as well as Italy and the Kingdom of Serbs, Croats and Slovenes, resulting in the Free State of Fiume. Bartini moved to Italy and received citizenship, where he became a member of the Italian Communist Party (ICP) and attended flying school in 1921, and began studying aerospace at the Politecnico di Milano in 1922.

=== Soviet Union ===
After the Fascist takeover in Italy in October 1922, the ICP sent Bartini to the Soviet Union as an aviation engineer, taking all the latest Italian design and avant-garde technology he was able to gather. Bartini received Soviet citizenship and changed his name to Robert Ludvigovich Bartini according to Eastern Slavic naming customs. Bartini initially worked at an airport near Khodynka Field in Moscow before occupying several engineering and command positions for the research wing of the Soviet Air Force. In 1928, Bartini began working for the Central Design Bureau building seaplanes near Sevastopol and the following year became the head of the department of amphibious experimental aircraft design, but was fired in 1930 for writing a letter to the Central Committee of the CPSU criticising the existence of the organisation. Bartini was quickly hired by the research wing of the Red Army where he began working on the Stal-series of aeroplanes. At the International Exhibition in Paris in August 1936, the Bartini Stal-7 broke the international speed record. He also published papers concerning aviation construction materials and technology, aerodynamics, dynamics of flight, and even theoretical physics.

In 1938, Bartini was arrested by the NKVD on charges of being an "enemy of the people" and a spy for Fascist Italy. He was extrajudicially convicted by a troika, receiving a 10-year imprisonment sentence. During his imprisonment Bartini continued his work on new aircraft designs, first at the sharashka TsKB-29, an NKVD experiment aircraft design bureau in Moscow where he worked with Andrei Tupolev designing the Tupolev Tu-2, which became one of the most important Soviet aircraft of World War II. Bartini's Stal-7 plane also became the base for the Yermolayev Yer-2 bomber, also used by the Soviet Air Force during the war. When German troops were close to Moscow during the German invasion of the Soviet Union, TsKB-29 was moved from the city to Omsk where Bartini led his own design bureau, OKB-86. His bureau was disbanded in 1943, and he began working on various transport plane projects. Bartini was released in 1946, later working at the Dimitrov Aircraft Factory in Taganrog until 1952, when he became the chief engineer of advanced aircraft designs at the Scientific Research Institute in Novosibirsk. In 1956, during the de-Stalinisation under Nikita Khrushchev, Bartini was officially rehabilitated by the Soviet state. The following year he was transferred to the OKBS MAP design bureau in Lyubertsy with Pavel Vladimirovich Tsybin, and received backing from Marshal of the Soviet Union Georgy Zhukov, at the time the Minister of Defence of the USSR. Zhukov was forced out the position shortly afterwards, and most of the projects he backed were cancelled. In 1961, Bartini had proposed a nuclear-powered supersonic long-range reconnaissance aircraft.

Contributions of Bartini were well appreciated at the highest levels of the Soviet government, and he was awarded the Order of Lenin in 1967. High esteem for his contributions to defence afforded him the help from Pontecorvo and Gershtein to publish his theoretical physics paper in the prestigious Proceedings of the Soviet Academy of Sciences (Doklady). The paper was considered to be strange even by Gershtein who was asked to help edit it and prepare for publication, while after the publication some prominent physicists initially thought that "Roberto Oros di Bartini" was a fictitious name invented specially for a scientific hoax. Bartini himself was apparently very proud of his paper, signed it with his noble name, and confided in Gershtein that this was the most important contribution of his lifetime. The paper develops the idea of the dimension of spacetime which is dynamical, equal to four only on average, and presenting an argument in favour using some numerological relations between physical constants.

==== Ground-effect vehicles ====
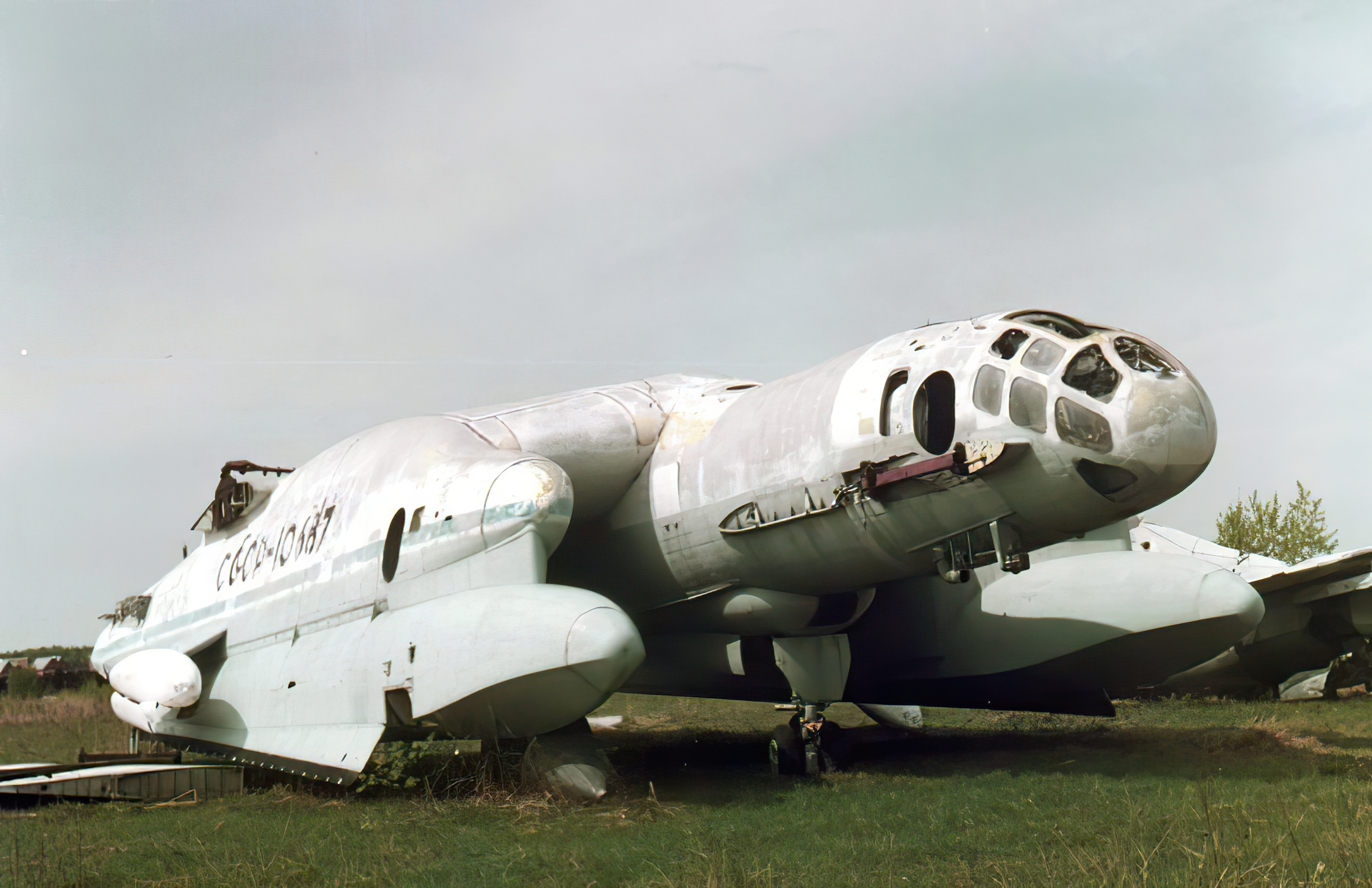
Partial remnants of the VVA-14 at the Central Air Force Museum

In the mid-1950s, Bartini became involved in ground-effect vehicles, named ekranoplans, in which the Soviet government developed a great interest. The extensive development of these vehicles led to Bartini's first output in 1964, with the Be-1, a small prototype ekranoplan made for research by the Beriev Design Bureau. In 1968, Bartini returned to Taganrog to specifically develop seaplanes, where began development of his last known project, the Bartini Beriev VVA-14, an experimental ekranoplan featuring vertical takeoff intended to be used in anti-submarine warfare against American submarines armed with Polaris missiles.

== Family ==
Bartini's personal life included several relationships and two families. According to a biographical article published in the Russian historical magazine Rodina in April 2015, he arrived in the Soviet Union accompanied by Olga Lukashevich, a Slovenian woman described as his common-law wife. He subsequently formed a relationship with Elizaveta Shvedskaya, with whom he had a son, Gero Bartini (1930 – 4 August 1959), and a grandson, Oleg G. Bartini. The magazine noted that some details of his relationships and descendants remained unconfirmed.

Following his release from imprisonment, Bartini lived in Moscow with Elizaveta, their son Gero, his daughter-in-law and his grandson Oleg. The five family members initially shared an 11-square-metre basement room in Merzlyakovsky Lane. In 1955, following Bartini's request for rehabilitation, reinstatement in the Communist Party and improved housing, he was allocated a two-room flat at 10 Kutuzovsky Prospekt. His grandson later recalled visiting him there as a child, drawing pictures together and listening to his grandfather's accounts of aircraft and space exploration.

During his subsequent work in Taganrog, Bartini established another family. According to Rodina, he had a second son, Vladimir, who was living in Taganrog at the time of the article's publication in 2015. The magazine also reported that Bartini mentioned another woman in his will, although her identity and relationship to him were not established.

Hi son, Gero Bartini, an enthusiastic mountaineer, died in 1959 in an avalanche in the Pamir Mountains. According to his son Oleg, Gero's death coincided with Robert Bartini's first heart attack.

Despite his family relationships, Bartini generally preferred to live alone. The writer Igor Chutko, who visited him in the early 1960s, recalled that Bartini lived separately from his wife, son and grandson, although he remained deeply attached to them. Chutko attributed this arrangement to Bartini's unconventional domestic habits, particularly his preference for keeping books, drawings, technical papers and personal belongings scattered throughout his apartment in an arrangement that was intelligible primarily to himself.

== Death ==
Bartini died on 6 December 1974, in Moscow, at the age of 77. He was buried at Vvedenskoye Cemetery with a grave featuring a monument with the inscription "In the land of the Soviets, he kept his oath to devote all life that the red planes flew faster than the black (ones)". Bartini had almost no contact with Italy since he had left in the 1920s. Beriev eventually cancelled the VVA-14 project as development slowed and eventually stopped after Bartini's death.

== Influence ==
Bartini influenced many Soviet aircraft engineers, particularly Sergey Pavlovich Korolev who named Bartini as his teacher. At various times and to different degrees, Bartini has been connected with other prominent Soviet aircraft engineers such as Sergey Ilyushin, Oleg Antonov, Vladimir Myasishchev, Alexander Yakovlev and many others.

Bartini's Effect, a phenomenon in aerodynamics where drag is reduced and thrust is increased when aircraft propellers are arranged of two motors in a tandem, was named in honour of Bartini as it was first used on his DAR aeroplane.

In recognition of his contributions to aerodynamics and aircraft design, his name was put forward to name an asteroid. 4982 Bartini, a main-belt asteroid, the asteroid Bartini, the 4982nd asteroid registered, was named in his honour.

== List of Bartini's aircraft designs ==
This table of Bartini's designs incorporates information extracted from the Russian language Wikipedia article on Bartini. "(Prototype)" indicates an aircraft project where a physical example was built to some extent but was never operational. "(Draft)" indicates an aircraft project that was likely a prefeasibility study where no physical examples were built.

Name	Description
A-55	(Prototype) Medium-range bomber flying boat (1955)
A-57	(Draft) Jet-powered flying boat strategic bomber with a range of 14,000 kilometres (8,700 mi) (1957)
AL-40	(Draft) Nuclear-powered hydroplane, SibNIA, 1960s.
DAR	Stainless steel flying boat for long range Arctic reconnaissance.
Be-1	Light amphibious ekranoplan for the study of ground effect. (1961)
E-57	Seaplane bomber, carrier cruise missile K-10 nuclear bomb. Crew - 2 people. By design, the plane was identical to the A-57. Tailless. Range - 7000 km
Yer-2 (DB-240)	Military version of the Stal-7 developed by Vladimir Yermolaev. (June 1940)
Yer-2 AM-35	(April 1942)
Yer-2 ACh-30B	~300 were built. 3x1000kg bombs. Max speed 446 km/h. Range 5000 km.
MTB-2	(Draft) Maritime heavy bomber (1929-1930)
MVA-62	(Prototype) Amphibious aircraft with vertical takeoff and landing. (1962)
P-57 (F-57)	(Draft) Supersonic bomber variant of the A-57.
R 53.6K	(?) All the aerodynamic surfaces were "calculatable" and have up to 4-th derivative function value. 1940s.
R-AL	(Draft) Nuclear-powered long-range reconnaissance variant of the A-57 (1961)
Stal-6	Experimental fighter, established Soviet speed record in 1933.
Stal-7	Twin-engined stainless steel 12-seater passenger aircraft prototype, established international speed record in 1936 (1935)
Stal-8	Fighter based on Stal-6 (1934)
T-107	(Prototype) Passenger plane (1945)
T-108	(Draft) Light transport aircraft (1945)
T-117	(Prototype) Two-engined transport aircraft prototype - scrapped before finished (1948)
T-200	(Prototype) Heavy amphibious military transport (1947)
T-203	(Draft) Supersonic plane with ogival wings (1952)
T-210	(Prototype) Variant of the T-200 (draft)
T-500	(Prototype) Heavy transport ekranolyot* (draft)
VVA-14-1/M-62	(Prototype) Experimental anti-submarine vertical takeoff ekranoplan. Variant with pontoons designated 14M1P.

* Ekranolyot refers to a hybrid ground-effect vehicle (ekranoplan) also capable of flight at more regular altitudes.
