= OKB Chyetverikov =

OKB Chyetverikov was a Soviet aircraft design bureau headed by designer Igor Vyacheslavovich Chyetverikov at the TsAGI (Tsentrahl'nyy Aerodinamicheskiy i Ghidrodinamicheskiy Institoot- central aerodynamics and hydrodynamics institute) Menzhinskii factory in 1931 in order to produce flying boat designs.

== Overview ==
Chyetverikov, Igor Vyacheslavovich (1909–1987), was a Soviet aircraft designer, and a Candidate in Technical Sciences (1951).
After completion of the Institute of the railroad and highway engineers, from 1928 he worked in D.P.Grigorovich’s OKB, where he conducted static and flight tests of training biplane MU-2. After the arrest of Grigorovich, he worked in Richard KB. With the departure of Richard, KB MOS was transferred to TsKB (Tsentrahl'noye konstrooktorskoye byuro - central construction bureau) TsAGI (Tsentrahl'nyy Aerodinamicheskiy i Ghidrodinamicheskiy Institoot- central aerodynamics and hydrodynamics institute) in the name of N. Ye. Zhukovskiy, where Chyetverikov headed the naval aviation division.
In December 1931 Chyetverikov departed for Sevastopol to participate in the tests of his long-range reconnaissance aircraft MDR-3. However, during the second flight MDR-3 begun to experience a strong vibration of the tail assembly-buffeting. On the 25 March 1932 tests are finally interrupted on the bureau's first major project. The MDR-3 was only a limited success, and then only after substantial redesign by Tupolev after the design documentation for MDR-3 was transferred to ZOK TscAgi (KB Tupolev), where the design was used as a base for Ant-27 (MDR-4). In 1930, G.M.Beriev, working in Chyetverikov’s division, proposes a project MBR-2 which Chyetverikov supports. However, after the transfer of TsKB TsAGI to TSKB-39 during 1933, brigade №5 (naval aircraft) is headed by Beriev and not Chyetverikov.
Unemployed in 1933, Chyetverikov turned to the division for design for gliders and propeller-driven sleighs (OSGA) of NII GVF(Naoochno-Issledovatel'skiy Institoot Grazdahnskovo Vozdooshnovo Flota - scientific test institute for civil air fleet) with the proposal for creation of aircraft for the submarines (SPL and Hydro-1). In 1934-1935 Chyetverikov designed and built a light flying boat in two versions: OSGA-101 - deck-based aircraft, and SPL – a folding aircraft for a submarine. In 1935 the SPL was presented by Chyetverikov at the Milan exhibition of 1935, and in 1937 it was used to establish several World records.

At the beginning of 1936 Chyetverikov completed an Arctic reconnaissance aircraft ARK-3 (MP-2). He began this work in 1933 when working at OSGA, but interest in the design was shown by Glavsevmorput (Glavsevmorput – chief administration of northern sea route), and the OKB obtained basing in Sevastopol for design testing where Chyetverikov was transferred to from GVF to GUAPV. ARK-3 served as a basis for the flying boat MDR-6 (Chye-2) design. In 1937 MDR-6 underwent plant and inspection tests, and commenced series production. Chyetverikov's only major design was the MDR-6 that was widely produced and used during World War II. By 1945 several modifications were developed in the basic design. During the war Chyetverikov attempted to modify the design to allow reaching speeds of land-based aircraft on the MDR-6 seaplane.
After World War II Chyetverikov was asked to develop a jet bomber based on the captured Arado Ar 234. In 1947 Chyetverikov produced the transport amphibian TA.
At the end of 1948 the OKB were closed, and Chyetverikov transferred to teaching work at the LKVVIA.

== Aircraft ==
- Chyetverikov ARK-3
- Chetverikov ARK-4
- Chyetverikov MDR-3
- Chetverikov MR-4bis
- Chyetverikov MDR-6 "Mug" (Chye-2)
- Chyetverikov OSGA-101
- Chyetverikov SPL
- Chyetverikov TA-1
