= MDR3 =

MDR3 may refer to:

- Multidrug resistance protein 3, a protein that in humans is encoded by the ABCB4 gene and is associated with progressive familial intrahepatic cholestasis type 3
- Chyetverikov MDR-3, a long range Russian flying boat
