= Bartini A-57 =

1957 Soviet bomber project

General information
- Type: Strategic bomber
- National origin: Soviet Union
- Designer: Robert Ludvigovich Bartini
- Status: Cancelled
- Number built: None

The Bartini A-57 was an experimental Soviet bomber and seaplane from the mid-1950s that was designed by Robert Ludvigovich Bartini. The aircraft was never put into production.

The A-57 was equipped with a lift jet (similar to VTOL aircraft today) facing downward to assist its take-off from the surface of the ocean. It was intended to refuel from submarines out at sea. The bomber had a long, slender delta wing called the Bartini Wing. A 1500 mph (supersonic) speed was planned. It was tested in wind tunnels, but the project was scrapped in 1957 before actual production could begin. Possibly because the Soviet Government after the launch of Sputnik 1 believed that the new R-7 ICBM made bombers less required and decided the Tu-95 would do and that the A-57 project was too expensive along with the perspective that such an aircraft was not needed.
