= Yermolayev Yer-2 =

Soviet medium bomber

Yer-2
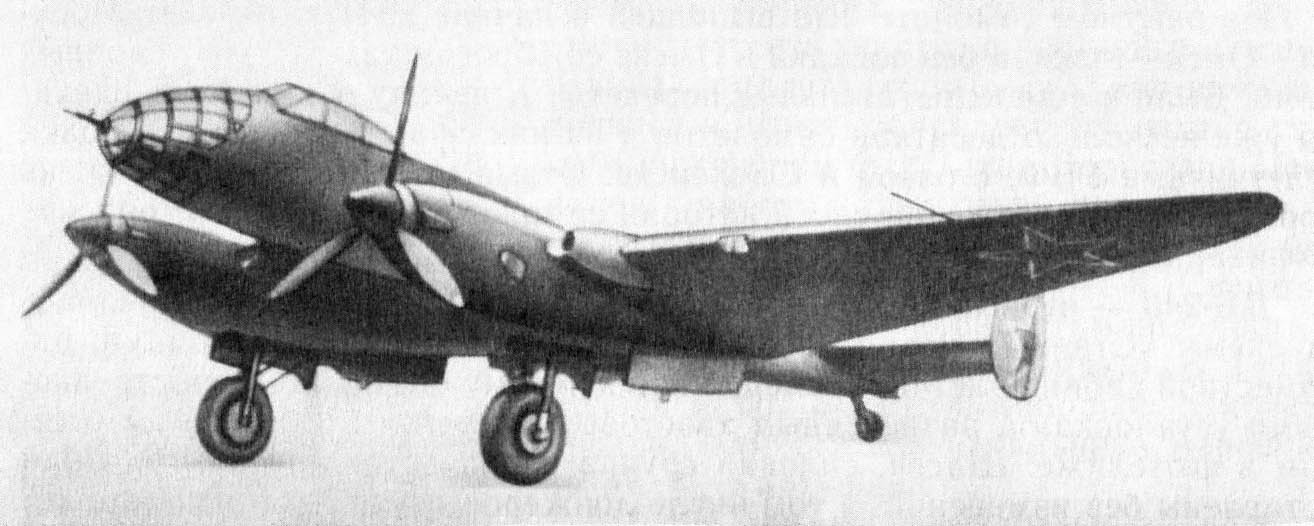

General information
- Type: Long-range medium bomber
- National origin: USSR
- Designer: Yermolaev OKB
- Status: Retired
- Primary user: Soviet Air Force
- Number built: about 360–370

History
- Introduction date: 1941
- First flight: 14 May 1940
- Retired: 1950 (est.)
- Developed from: Bartini Stal-7

The Yermolayev Yer-2 (Russian: Ермолаев Ер-2) was a long-range Soviet medium bomber used during World War II. It was developed from the Bartini Stal-7 prototype airliner before the war. It was used to bomb Berlin from airbases in Estonia after Operation Barbarossa began in 1941. Production was terminated in August 1941 to allow the factory to concentrate on building higher-priority Ilyushin Il-2 ground-attack aircraft, but was restarted at the end of 1943 with new, fuel-efficient, Charomskiy ACh-30B aircraft diesel engines.

Although designed as a long-range medium bomber it was flown on tactical ground-attack missions during the Battle of Moscow with heavy losses. The survivors were flown, in ever dwindling numbers, until August 1943 when the last examples were transferred to schools. However, the resumption of production in 1943 allowed the aircraft to resume combat operations in April 1945. The Yer-2 remained in service with Long-Range Aviation until it was replaced by four-engined bombers such as the Tupolev Tu-4 at the end of the 1940s.

Some later variants, differentiated mostly by engine choices, are designated Yer-4 and Yer-6 in some sources.

== Development ==
Roberto Bartini had designed and built the Stal-7 airliner whilst he was the chief designer at the ZOK NII GVF (Russian: Завод Опытных Конструкций Научно-Исследовательского Института Граждаского Воздушного Флота – Zavod Opytnykh Konstrooktsiy Naoochno-Issledovatel'skogo Institoota Grazhdanskogo Vozdooshnogo Flota, lit. 'Factory for Special Constructions at the Scientific Test Institute for the Civil Air Fleet'). The performance of the Stal-7 was exceptional, particularly in respect to its payload: at gross overload weight over 56% of the total weight was payload. During flight trials with maximum all-up weight the prototype crashed on takeoff in early 1938, resulting in the arrest of Bartini and his imprisonment in a Siberian gulag in February 1938. The Stal-7 lay unrepaired until Vladimir Yermolaev was appointed as chief designer at OKB-240 after Bartini's arrest, with the task of transforming the Stal-7 design into a long-range bomber, a task made easier since Bartini had reserved space for a bomb bay in the fuselage. After repair the Stal-7 carried on with the flight-test programme, including a record-breaking nonstop flight on 28 August 1939 when it flew Moscow—Sverdlovsk—Sevastopol—Moscow; a distance of 5,086 km (3,160 mi) at an average speed of 405 km/h (252 mph).

Preliminary design of the DB-240 (Russian: dahl'niy bombardirovschik, lit. 'long-range bomber'), as the bomber version was designated, was completed by the beginning of 1939 and the construction of two prototypes began the following July. The DB-240 retained little apart from the general layout of the Stal-7 as the structure was almost completely redesigned. The pilot's cockpit was offset to port to improve his downward view and the navigator/bomb aimer sat in the extensively glazed nose with a 7.62-millimeter (0.300 in) ShKAS machine gun, the radio operator sat below and to starboard of the pilot and the dorsal gunner in a partially retractable turret with one 12.7-millimeter (0.50 in) Berezin UBT machine gun. Another ShKAS was fitted in a ventral hatch. Up to 2,000 kg (4,409 lb) of bombs could be carried in the bomb bay and two 500-kilogram (1,102 lb) bombs could be carried externally. Up to 4,600 kg (10,141 lb) of fuel could be carried. The DB-240 had been designed to use the experimental Klimov M-106 V12 engines, but the less-powerful Klimov M-105 engine had to be substituted because the M-106 was not available.

The DB-240 prototype flew for the first time on 14 May 1940 and began its State acceptance tests on 27 September 1940. The weaker engines prevented the DB-240 from reaching its designed performance. It could only attain 445 km/h (277 mph) at 4,250 m (13,944 ft) instead of the expected 500 km/h (311 mph) at 6,000 meters (19,685 ft). Its defensive armament was deemed inadequate and other problems included an excessively long take-off run and engine defects. However, these did not offset its virtues of a heavy bomb load and long-range (4,100 kilometers (2,548 mi) carrying 1,000 kg (2,205 lb) of bombs). It was ordered into production at Factory No. 18, in Voronezh, as the Yermolayev Yer-2.

Manufacture began in March 1941, with approximately 50 aircraft delivered by 22 June 1941. These aircraft were about 5–8 km/h (3.1–5.0 mph) slower than the prototype and their normal weight increased 1,220 kg (2,690 lb) to 12,520 kg (27,602 lb). Production was terminated in August 1941 with only 128 built to allow the factory to concentrate on the higher-priority Ilyushin Il-2 ground-attack aircraft.

A Yer-2 was modified with experimental Mikulin AM-37 engines, a reinforced undercarriage, armored seats for the navigator and gunner, and 12.7 mm UBT machine guns in place of its original ShKAS weapons. It first flew in July 1941 and was able to reach 505 km/h (314 mph) at 6,000 m (19,685 ft), but the range was reduced to 3,500 km (2,175 mi) carrying 1,000 kg (2,205 lb) of bombs. One significant problem with this version was the excessive takeoff roll which hindered operations from grass airstrips. The engine was unreliable, however, and had cooling problems that the Mikulin OKB did not have the resources to resolve so it was cancelled in October when the factory was forced to evacuate from Moscow by the German advance.

The Charomskiy M-40F Diesel engine was also evaluated in a Yer-2 in 1941. This engine, like all Diesels, offered a greatly reduced fuel consumption compared to a standard gasoline-powered engine, but at a great penalty in weight. These engines increased the gross takeoff weight to 13,500 kg (29,762 lb) which required the undercarriage to be reinforced and the wing area increased to keep the same wing loading. The M-40F-powered aircraft reached a maximum speed of 430 km/h (267 mph) at 6,050 m (19,849 ft). However, the M-40 was not yet ready for service use and the project was cancelled.

The aircraft/engine combination did have enough potential that development work continued using the closely related, but more mature, Charomskiy ACh-30B Diesel engine. The cockpit was modified to accommodate two pilots side-by-side and the wing and tailplane areas were increased. The 12.7 mm UBT machine gun in the dorsal turret was replaced by a 20-millimeter (0.79 in) ShVAK cannon and the nose and ventral ShKAS machine guns were exchanged for 12.7 mm UBT machine guns. Up to 5,460 kg (12,037 lb) of fuel could be carried. The Yer-2/ACh-30B was placed into production at Factory No. 39 in Irkutsk at the end of 1943 and the first production aircraft was submitted to its State acceptance trials the following month. Some excess aircraft were converted as Yer-2ON VIP transports.

== Operational history ==
The Yer-2 was not in squadron service when Germany invaded on 22 June 1941, but the 420th and 421st Long-Range Bomber Regiments (Russian: Dahl'niy Bombardirovchnyy Aviapolk—DBAP) were formed shortly afterwards. However neither regiment flew any operational missions until later in the summer. On the evening of 10 August Yer-2s of the 420th DBAP, accompanied by Petlyakov Pe-8s of the 432nd DBAP, attempted to bomb Berlin from Pushkino Airfield near Leningrad. The airfield was too short to accommodate a fully loaded Yer-2, but three bombers did manage to take off regardless. Two managed to bomb Berlin, or its outskirts, but only one successfully returned; the other was shot down by 'friendly' Polikarpov I-16s when it reentered Soviet airspace and the third aircraft went missing. Three crews from the 420th DBAP bombed Königsberg during the nights of 28–29 and 30 August – 1 September from Ramenskoye Airport, southeast of Moscow.

On 1 October 1941 63 Yer-2s were in service, but only 34 were operational. The 420th DBAP had flown 154 sorties by the beginning of November (6 in August, 81 in September, 67 in October) and had lost 30 of its 40 aircraft. Over half of these (19) were due to non-combat losses. Losses were extremely high over the autumn and winter as they were inappropriately committed against German tactical frontline targets during the Battle of Moscow at low altitudes and only 12 were in service on 18 March 1942. On 4 August 1942 the 747th DBAP had only ten Yer-2s on hand and it was briefly committed during the Battle of Stalingrad. The survivors were flown, in ever dwindling numbers, until August 1943 when the last few aircraft were transferred to schools by the 2nd Guards DBAP and the 747th DBAP.

The Yer-2 was placed back into production at the end of 1943, but none of the new bombers had been issued to combat units by 1 June 1944. However 42 were in service on 1 January 1945 and 101 on 10 May 1945 after the war ended. The first combat mission undertaken by Yer-2s after they returned to production was a raid on Königsberg on 7 April 1945 by the 327th and 329th Bomber Aviation Regiments (Russian: Bombardirovchnyy Aviatsionyy Polk). It remained in service with Long-Range Aviation units until replaced by four-engined bombers like the Tupolev Tu-4 in the late 1940s.

== Variants ==
DB-240
Two prototypes of the Yer-2 series with two 1,050 hp M-105 engines.
Yer-2
Production version with two M-105 engines, 128 built.
Yer-2/AM-37
One aircraft re-engined with two prototype 1,380 hp Mikulin AM-37 engines, the fastest of all Yer-2s.
Yer-2/M-40F
The first diesel-powered Yer-2, with modified wings. One converted with two 1,500 hp Charomskiy M-40F diesel engines.
Yer-2/ACh-30B
Production model of the diesel-engined version. Performance was excellent despite the poor reliability and rough running of the Charomskiy ACh-30B diesel engines. Range increased 1,500 km (930 mi) from the version with M-105 engines.
Yer-2ON
(Russian: Osobogo Naznachyeniya−Special Assignment) Two aircraft from the Yer-2/ACh-30B production line were modified with a 12-seat VIP cabin, military equipment removed and long-range fuel tanks in the bomb-bay. A third aircraft was converted from a Yer-2 (1941 production) and used for shuttle flights between Irkutsk and Moscow.
Yer-2N
(Russian: Nositel−Carrier) One aircraft was modified as an engine testbed for captured Argus As 014 pulse jet engines.
Yer-2/MB-100
One production aircraft used as a testbed for the 2,200 horsepower (1,600 kW) Dobrotvorskii MB-100 engine in 1945.
Yer-4
1945 version with ACh-30BF engines and a redesigned cooling system. One source states that this was a single airframe (No. 11), and another states that a small batch of 11 aircraft with ACh-30BF engines was produced, but does not use the Yer-4 designation for them. At least one other source instead applies the Yer-4 designation to a 1943 prototype that he states did not enter production. However, his description otherwise matches the aircraft that other sources identify as the prototype that led to the Yer-2/ACh-30B production series, including its engine choice, extended wingspan, cannon armament in the nose, and development timeline. (Note: Yakubovich notes this as a mistake in some sources and attributes it to the prototype being pre-production airframe No.4. Shavrov also states that pre-production airframe no.4 was used as the ACh-30B prototype, but never refers to the Yer-4 designation in his own description of Yer-2 variants.)
Yer-6
The designation Yer-6 was applied to two different aircraft in some documentation:
- The first was a Yer-2 tested with M-40F engines in 1941. Fifteen flights had been made before the outbreak of war with Germany.
- The designation was re-used for a Yer-2 fitted with special engine mounts that allowed for M-40F, M-ZO, or AM-38F engines to be fitted without any further modifications.

== Operators ==
Soviet Union

- VVS (Russian: Voyenno-Vozdooshnyye Seely—Soviet Air Forces)
  - ADD (Russian: Aviahtsiya Dahl'nevo Deystviya—Long Range Aviation)
    - 420th Long-Range Bomber Aviation Regiment, later the 748th Long-Range Bomber Aviation Regiment
    - 421st Long-Range Bomber Aviation Regiment, later the 747th Long-Range Bomber Aviation Regiment
    - 747th Long-Range Bomber Aviation Regiment
    - 748th Long-Range Bomber Aviation Regiment, later the 2nd Guards Long-Range Aviation Regiment
    - 327th Long-Range Bomber Aviation Regiment
    - 329th Long-Range Bomber Aviation Regiment

== Specifications (Yer-2/ACh-30B) ==
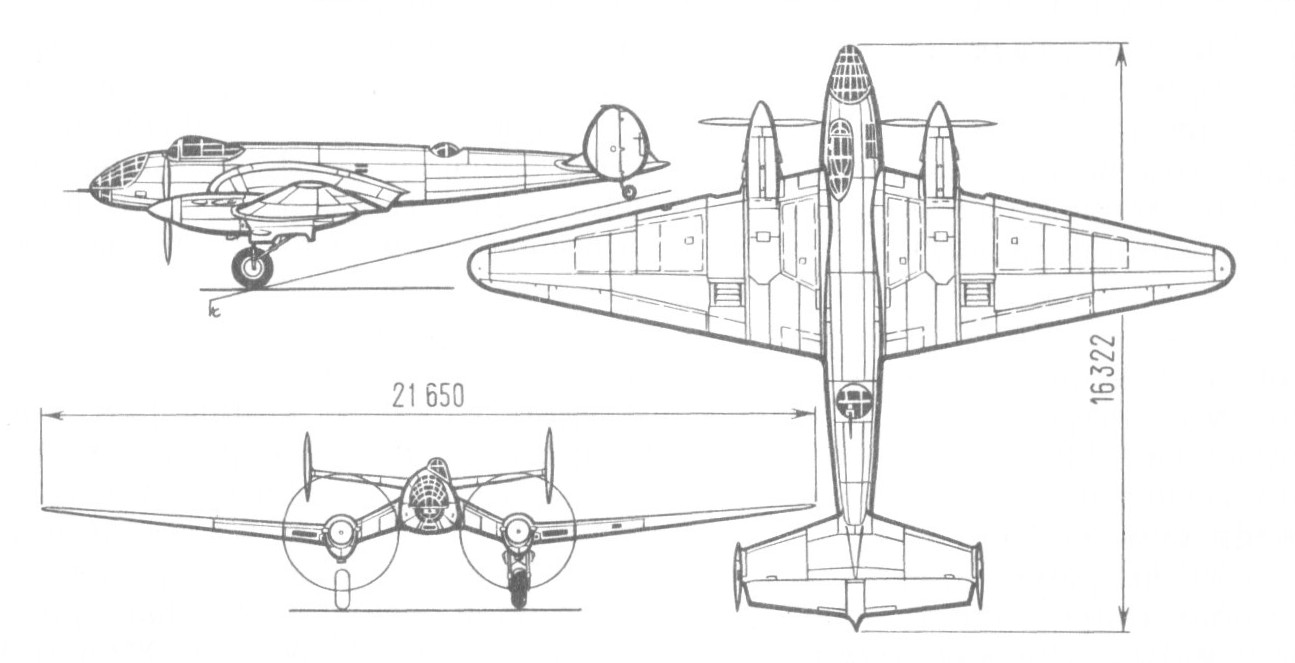

Data from Gunston, p. 503

General characteristics

- Crew: 4
- Length: 16.42 m (53 ft 10 in)
- Wingspan: 23 m (75 ft 6 in)
- Height: 4.82 m (15 ft 10 in)
- Wing area: 79 m^{2} (850 sq ft)
- Empty weight: 10,455 kg (23,049 lb)
- Gross weight: 18,580 kg (40,962 lb)
- Powerplant: 2 × Charomskiy ACh-30B V-12 liquid-cooled diesel piston engines, 1,100 kW (1,500 hp) each
- Propellers: 3-bladed constant-speed propellers

Performance

- Maximum speed: 420 km/h (260 mph, 230 kn)
- Range: 5,500 km (3,400 mi, 3,000 nmi)
- Service ceiling: 7,200 m (23,600 ft)

Armament

- Guns:

- 1 × 12.7 mm UBT machine-gun in nose flexible mount.
- 1 × 12.7 mm UBT machine-gun in ventral flexible mount.
- 1 × 20 mm ShVAK cannon in a TUM-5 dorsal turret.

- Bombs: Up to 2,000 kg (4,409 lb) internally, maximum of 5,000 kg (11,023 lb)

== See also ==
Aircraft of comparable role, configuration, and era

- North American XB-28
- Douglas B-23

Related lists

- List of aircraft

== Notes ==
=== Bibliography ===
- Gordon, Yefim (2008). Soviet Airpower in World War 2. Hinckley, England: Midland Publishing. ISBN 978-1-85780-304-4.
- Gunston, Bill (1995). The Osprey Encyclopaedia of Russian Aircraft 1875–1995. London: Osprey. ISBN 1-85532-405-9.
- Medved, Aleksandr; Khazanov, Dmitriy (1999). Дальний бомбардировщик Ер-2 [Long-range Bomber Yer-2]. Moscow: Tekhnika Molodezhi.
- Nemecek, Vaclav (1986). The History of Soviet Aircraft from 1918. London: Willow Books. ISBN 0-00-218033-2.
- Shavrov, Vadim Borisovich (1978). История конструкций самолетов в СССР 1938—1950 г.г. [History of Aircraft Construction in the USSR 1938—1950]. Moscow: Mashinostroenie.
- Yakubovich, Nikolai Vasilevich (2013). Великий Бартини. «Воланд» советской авиации [Velikii Bartini: Woland of Soviet Aviation]. Moscow: Eksmo.
