= Chyetverikov MDR-6 =

MDR-6
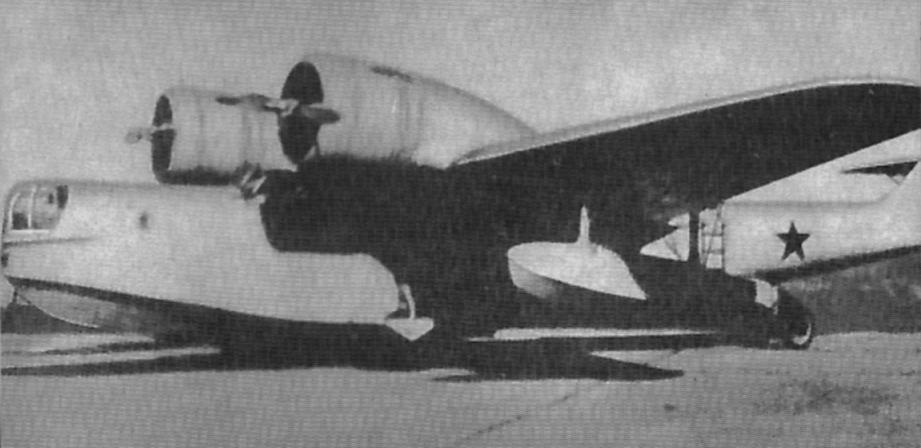

General information
- Type: Reconnaissance flying-boat
- Manufacturer: Chyetverikov
- Primary user: Soviet Naval Aviation
- Number built: 27

History
- Manufactured: 1939–1945
- Introduction date: 1941
- First flight: July 1937
- Retired: 1942

The Chyetverikov MDR-6 was a 1930s Soviet Union reconnaissance flying-boat aircraft, and the only successful aircraft designed by the design bureau led by Igor Chyetverikov.

== Development ==
First flying in July 1937, the MDR-6 was a two-engined high-wing monoplane of all-metal stressed skin construction. The prototype was powered by two M-25 radial engines. A production run of 20 units powered by M-63 engines were produced in 1940 and 1941. All the aircraft were withdrawn from service in 1942 due to structural problems.

Several progressively advanced prototypes were built from 1939 to 1945, but no further production ensued.

== Variants ==
MDR-6
Initial prototype. One built.
Chye-2
Production version powered by M-63 radial engine. 20 built.
MDR-6A
Redesign with smaller wing and two Klimov M-105 V-12 engines.
MDR-6B-1 to B-3
Refined developments of MDR-6A. Three prototypes built.
MDR-6B-4 to B5
New, much larger hull, powered by Klimov VK-107 engines. Two prototypes built.

== Operators ==
Soviet Union

- Soviet Naval Aviation

== Specifications (MDR-6A) ==
Data from Donald, 1997, pg 258.

General characteristics

- Crew: 3
- Capacity: 3
- Length: 15.73 m (51 ft 7.25 in)
- Wingspan: 19.4 m (63 ft 7.75 in)
- Wing area: 52.3 m^{2} (562.97 sq ft)
- Empty weight: 4,100 kg (9,039 lb)
- Gross weight: 7,200 kg (15,873 lb)
- Powerplant: 2 × Shvetsov M-63 radial piston , 821 kW (1,100 hp) each

Performance

- Maximum speed: 360 km/h (224 mph, 195 kn)
- Cruise speed: 220 km/h (137 mph, 119 kn)
- Range: 2,650 km (1,647 mi, 1,431 nmi)
- Service ceiling: 9,000 m (29,530 ft)

Armament

- 1 × 7.62-mm (0.3-in) ShKAS machine gun in bow turret
- 1 × 12.7-mm (0.5-in) UBT machine gun in dorsal turret
- 1,000-kg (2205-lb) bombload

== See also ==
Related lists

- List of aircraft of World War II
- List of flying boats and floatplanes

== Bibliography ==
- Donald, David, ed. (1997). The Encyclopedia of World Aircraft. Prospero Books. p. 258. ISBN 1-85605-375-X.
- Gunston, Bill (1995). The Osprey Encyclopedia of Russian Aircraft from 1875 – 1995. London: Osprey Aerospace. pp. 73–74. ISBN 1-85532-405-9.
- Maslov, Mihail (September 2000). "Un grand hydravion de reconnaissance maritime: le Chetverikov Che-2 (MDR-6A)" [The Chetverikov Che-2 (MDR-6A): A Large Maritime Reconnaissance Seaplane]. Avions: Toute l'Aéronautique et son histoire (in French) (90): 48–51. ISSN 1243-8650.
- Maslov, Mihail (November 2000). "Un grand hydravion de reconnaissance maritime: le Chetverikov Che-2 (MDR-6A)". Avions: Toute l'Aéronautique et son histoire (in French) (92): 49–55. ISSN 1243-8650.
