= Bartini DAR =

DAR
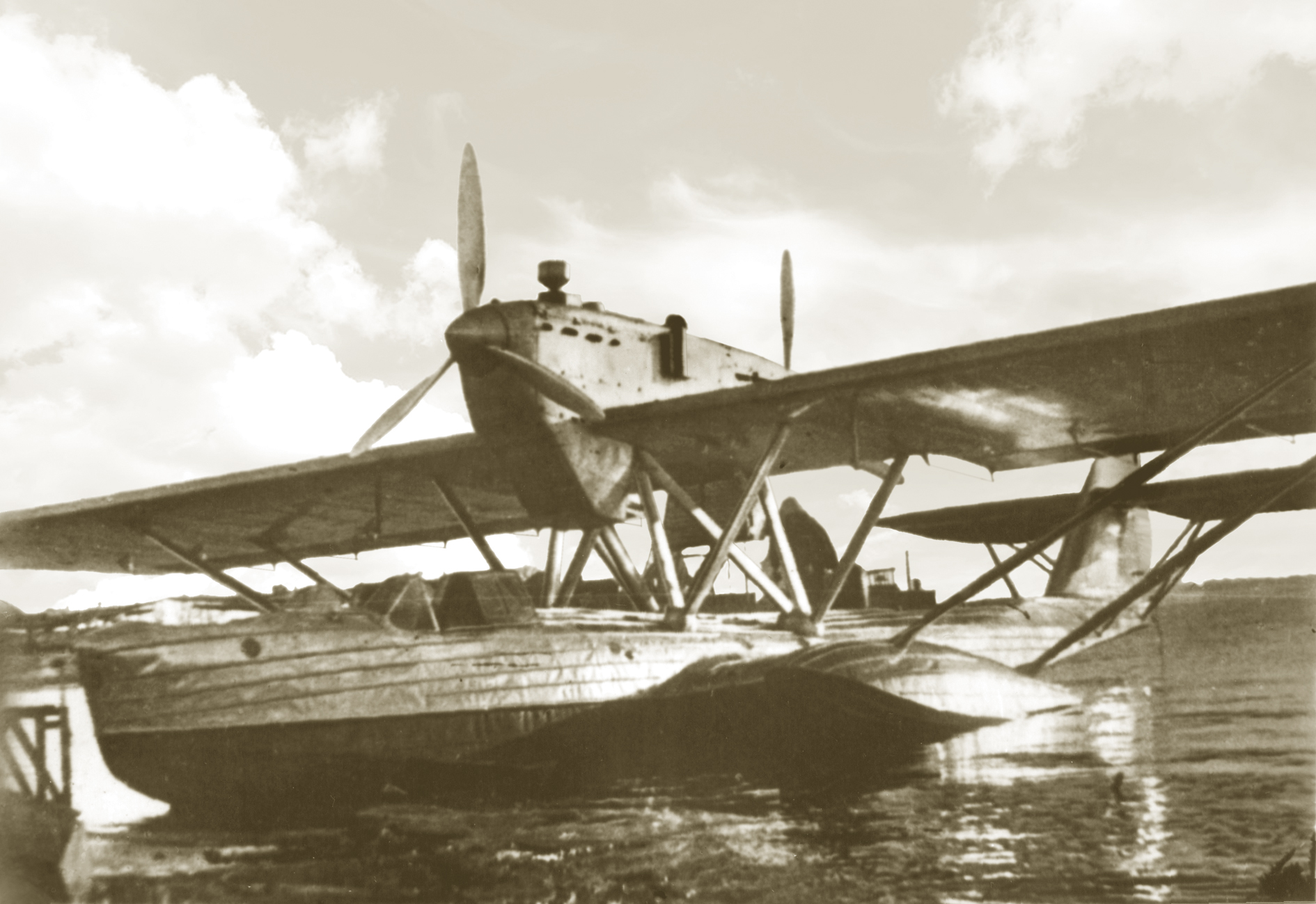

General information
- Type: Arctic reconnaissance flying boat
- National origin: USSR
- Manufacturer: ZOK NII GVF
- Designer: Roberto L. Bartini
- Number built: 1

History
- First flight: Spring 1936

The DAR (Dalnii Arkticheskii Razvyedchik – long range Arctic reconnaissance), was a twin-engined flying boat designed and produced in the USSR from 1934.

== Development ==
In 1934 Roberto L. Bartini was assigned to the ZOK NII GVF (Zavod Opytno Konstrooktorskoye Naoochno-Issledovatel'skiy Institoot Grazhdanskovo Vozdooshnovo Flota — Factory for Special Construction at the Scientific Test Institute for the Civil Air Fleet), to lead the design of the DAR. Built entirely of Enerzh-6 stainless steel, the DAR closely resembled the Dornier Wal, with a high length to beam ratio hull, sponsons either side of the hull, strut supported parasol wing and twin engines in a single nacelle in the centre of the wing. Initially Bartini intended the two engines to drive separate propellers running in a tubular shroud, much like a modern ducted fan; Tests at TsAGI (Tsentrahl'nyy Aerodinamicheskiy i Ghidrodinamicheskiy Institoot - central aerodynamics and hydrodynamics institute) confirmed Bartini's theories but the prototype was completed with a conventional tandem tractor/pusher engine nacelle.

Apart from the 'Enerzh-6' construction material, the DAR had several other innovations, including; full span slotted flaps, and pivoting wing-tip ailerons which were in two sections, fore and aft. During later testing steel faced skis were attached to the fuselage sides by rubber bag springs. Flight testing was carried out at the small boat port at Leningrad in the spring of 1936, with no major problems, and five more were ordered but production was not carried out.

== Specifications (DAR) ==
Data from Encyclopaedia of Russian Aircraft 1875-1995

General characteristics

- Length: 19.0 m (62 ft 4 in)
- Wingspan: 27.4 m (89 ft 11 in)
- Wing area: 100 m^{2} (1,100 sq ft)
- Empty weight: 4,820 kg (10,626 lb)
- Max takeoff weight: 7,200 kg (15,873 lb)
- Powerplant: 2 × Hispano-Suiza 12Ybrs V12 engines, 640 kW (860 hp) each

Performance

- Maximum speed: 240 km/h (150 mph, 130 kn)
- Cruise speed: 229 km/h (142 mph, 124 kn)
- Range: 2,000 km (1,200 mi, 1,100 nmi)
- Endurance: 20 hr

== See also ==
Aircraft of comparable role, configuration, and era

- Dornier Wal

Related lists

- List of aircraft
