= Beriev Be-1 =

Experimental wing-in-ground-effect aircraft

Be-1

General information
- Type: Experimental Wing-In-Ground-effect vehicle
- National origin: Soviet Union
- Manufacturer: Beriev
- Designer: Robert Ludvigovich Bartini
- Number built: 1

History
- First flight: 1964

The Beriev Be-1 was an experimental wing-in-ground-effect aircraft developed in the Soviet Union during the 1960s.

== Design and development ==
In 1956, Robert Ludvigovich Bartini approached the Beriev design bureau with a proposal for a Wing-In-Ground-effect vehicle (WIG). The Be-1 became the first experimental prototype, used for exploring the stability and control of wing-in-ground-effect aircraft.

The Be-1 featured two floats with very low aspect ratio wing sections between them and small normal wing panels extending outside the floats. Surface-piercing hydrofoils were mounted on the underside of the floats. The aircraft was powered by a single Tumansky RU-19 turbojet, mounted above the wing. The Be-1 was also equipped with landing gear. The aircraft was operated between 1961 and 1964. The first flight from water was made in 1964.

== See also ==
Related development

- Bartini Beriev VVA-14

Related lists

- List of Wing in Ground Effect Craft
