= Beriev MDR-5 =

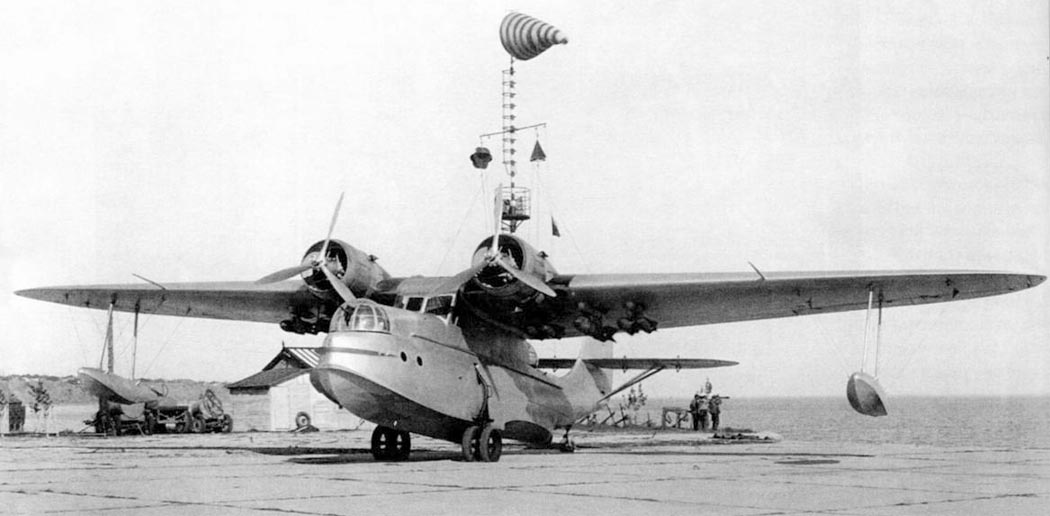

General information
- Type: Long-range reconnaissance bombing flying boat
- National origin: Soviet Union
- Manufacturer: Beriev
- Primary user: Soviet Naval Aviation
- Number built: 2

History
- First flight: 1938

The Beriev MDR-5 (Morskoi Dalnii Razvyeedchik - Long-range reconnaissance)(sometimes Beriev MS-5) was a Soviet long-range reconnaissance/bomber flying boat prototype developed by the Beriev design bureau at Taganrog. It did not enter production as the rival Chyetverikov MDR-6 was preferred.

== Development ==
The MDR-5 (Morskoi Dalnyi Razvedchik - naval long-range reconnaissance) was an all-metal twin-engined high-wing cantilever monoplane flying-boat. Designed to be operated by a crew of five it was powered by two Tumansky M-87A radial engines.

Two prototypes were built, the first, a pure flying boat flying which was built in 1938, with the second an amphibian.

Although MDR-5 was adequate, the rival Chyetverikov MDR-6 had already been ordered into production and the MDR-5 was not developed further and remained as prototypes.

== Operators ==
Soviet Union

- Soviet Navy

== Specifications ==
Data from

General characteristics

- Crew: 5
- Length: 15.88 m (52 ft 1 in)
- Wingspan: 25 m (82 ft 0 in)
- Wing area: 78.5 m^{2} (845 sq ft)
- Empty weight: 6,083 kg (13,411 lb)
- Max takeoff weight: 8,000 kg (17,637 lb)
- Powerplant: 2 × Tumansky M-87A radial piston engine, 710 kW (950 hp) each

Performance

- Maximum speed: 345 km/h (214 mph, 186 kn)
- Range: 2,415 km (1,501 mi, 1,304 nmi)
- Service ceiling: 8,150 m (26,740 ft)

Armament

- Guns: one 7.62mm (0.3in) ShKAS machine-gun in bow and midships manually operated turrets, and one downward firing through a ventral trap
- Bombs: 1000kg (2204lb)

== See also ==
Related lists

- List of flying boats and floatplanes
