= Beriev Be-112 =

Amphibious aircraft

Be-112
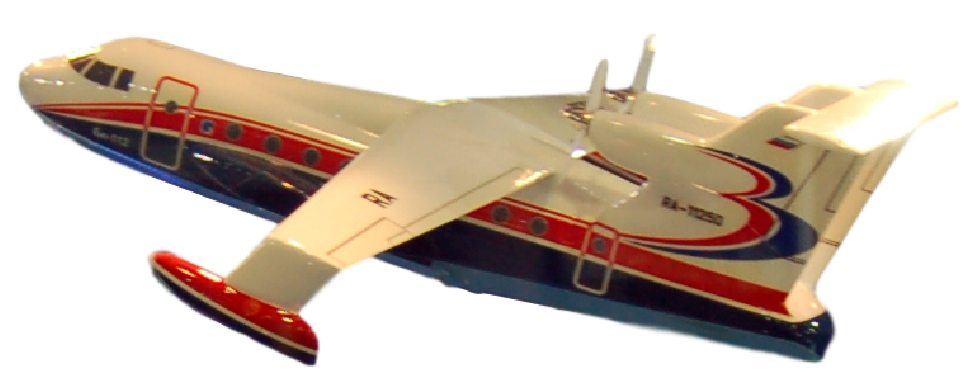
- Model of Beriev Be-112 at MAKS 2009 airshow

General information
- Type: Amphibious aircraft
- National origin: Russian Federation
- Manufacturer: Beriev
- Status: Paper project only
- Number built: none

The Beriev Be-112 is a proposed amphibian aircraft with two propeller engines, projected to carry 27 passengers. The Beriev firm lacks a production amphibian aircraft in this size.

Intended purposes of the Be-112 include passenger and cargo carriage, ambulance missions, surveillance, and search-and-rescue missions. Beriev also explored a version of the Be-112 with wing-mounted turboprop engines

== Specifications (proposed) ==
Data from beriev.com

General characteristics

- Crew: 2
- Capacity: 27 pax / 2,350 kg (5,181 lb) payload
- Length: 17 m (55 ft 9 in)
- Wingspan: 21.2 m (69 ft 7 in)
- Height: 5.2 m (17 ft 1 in)
- Gross weight: 11,000 kg (24,251 lb)
- Powerplant: 2 × Pratt & Whitney Canada PT6A-67R turboprop engines, 1,062 kW (1,424 hp) each
- Propellers: 5-bladed fully-feathering reversible constant-speed propellers

Performance

- Maximum speed: 420 km/h (260 mph, 230 kn)
- Cruise speed: 370 km/h (230 mph, 200 kn)
- Range: 1,000 km (620 mi, 540 nmi)

== Sources ==
- beriev.com
