= Leninets =

Leninets Ленинец
- Settlement
- Location within Volgograd Oblast Location within Russia
- Coordinates: 49°52′N 45°41′E
- Country: Russia
- Region: Volgograd Oblast
- District: Nikolayevsky District
- Time zone: UTC+4:00

Leninets (Russian: Ленинец) is a rural locality (a settlement) in Ilyichyovskoye Rural Settlement, Nikolayevsky District, Volgograd Oblast, Russia. The population was 56 as of 2010. There are 5 streets.

== Geography ==
Leninets is located in steppe on the left bank of the Volgograd Reservoir, 42 km southeast of Nikolayevsk (the district's administrative centre) by road. Put Ilyicha is the nearest rural locality.
