= Bartini Stal-7 =

Soviet airliner prototype

Stal-7
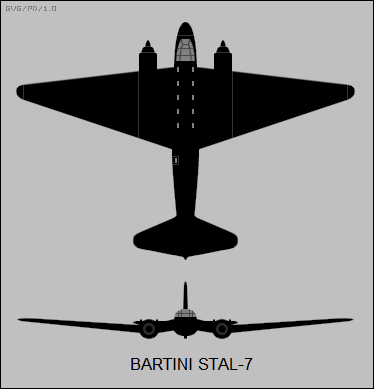
- 2-view silhouettes of a Bartini Stal-7 airliner.

General information
- Type: Transport
- National origin: Soviet Union
- Manufacturer: ZOK NII GVF
- Designer: Robert Bartini
- Number built: 1

History
- First flight: Spring 1935
- Developed into: Yermolayev Yer-2; Yermolayev Yer-4

The Bartini Stal-7 was a twin-engined transport aircraft designed and produced in the Soviet Union from 1934.

== Development ==
In 1934, Aeroflot issued a requirement for two transport aircraft types. Bartini began design work in October 1934 on an aircraft to meet the larger 10/12 passenger specification.

Flight testing began in spring 1935 piloted by Nikolai Shebanov, revealing high efficiency in speed, range and load. The aircraft was to make a trip around the world piloted by Shebanov and so it was loaded with additional equipment and an extra 7,400 litres (2,000 US gal) of fuel. By autumn 1937 it was ready to perform the trip, yet the Stal-7 crashed on take-off in 1938 during full load testing, prompting the arrest of Bartini who was imprisoned in a sharashka in Bolshevo led by fellow inmate Andrei Tupolev.

Repair of the Stal-7 was carried out under Vladimir Yermolayev's direction in 1939 and the aircraft continued to demonstrate excellent cruise performance during a 5,068 kilometres (3,149 mi), Moscow – Sverdlovsk – Sevastopol – Moscow, non-stop flight averaging 405 kilometres per hour (252 mph) on 28 August 1939.

The impressive performance of the Stal-7 prompted the appointment of Yermolayev as the head of OKB-240, to develop the Stal-7 into an effective long-range bomber, resulting in the DB-240 (Dal'niy Bombardirovschik – long-range bomber), Yer-2 and Yer-4 aircraft.

== Design ==
Initially, Bartini intended the Stal-7 to use a steel tube truss airframe, with fabric covering, but problems with complexity and the flexibility of the truss structure led Bartini to re-design the aircraft with a light-alloy monocoque structure.

The hydraulically retractable main undercarriage legs retracted rearwards into the engine nacelles housing Klimov M-100 or M-103 engines, which were positioned at the junction of the inverted gull wings. The trailing edges had hydraulically operated flaps inboard and ailerons outboard. Both the wings and tail surfaces were sharply tapered and the inboard wing sections sloped sharply upwards to pass through the fuselage cabin. The concave surface of the center section created an air cushion between the wings and ground, which reduced landing speed and increased horizontal speed.

== Specifications (Stal-7) ==
Data from The Osprey Encyclopedia of Russian Aircraft 1875–1995

General characteristics

- Crew: 2
- Capacity: 10/12
- Length: 16 m (52 ft 6 in)
- Wingspan: 23 m (75 ft 5.5 in)
- Wing area: 72 m^{2} (775 sq ft)
- Empty weight: 4,800 kg (10,580 lb)
- Gross weight: 11,000 kg (24,250 lb)
- Powerplant: 2 × Klimov M-103 V12 liquid-cooled piston engine, 641.3 kW (860 hp) each

Performance

- Maximum speed: 450 km/h (280 mph, 240 kn)
- Cruise speed: 360 or 380 km/h (224 or 236 mph, 195 or 205 kn)
- Range: 5,000 km (3,107 mi, 2,700 nmi)
- Service ceiling: 10,000 m (32,800 ft)

== See also ==
Aircraft of comparable role, configuration, and era

- Boeing 247
- Douglas DC-1

Related lists

- List of aircraft
