= Bartini Beriev VVA-14 =

Soviet amphibious aircraft

VVA-14
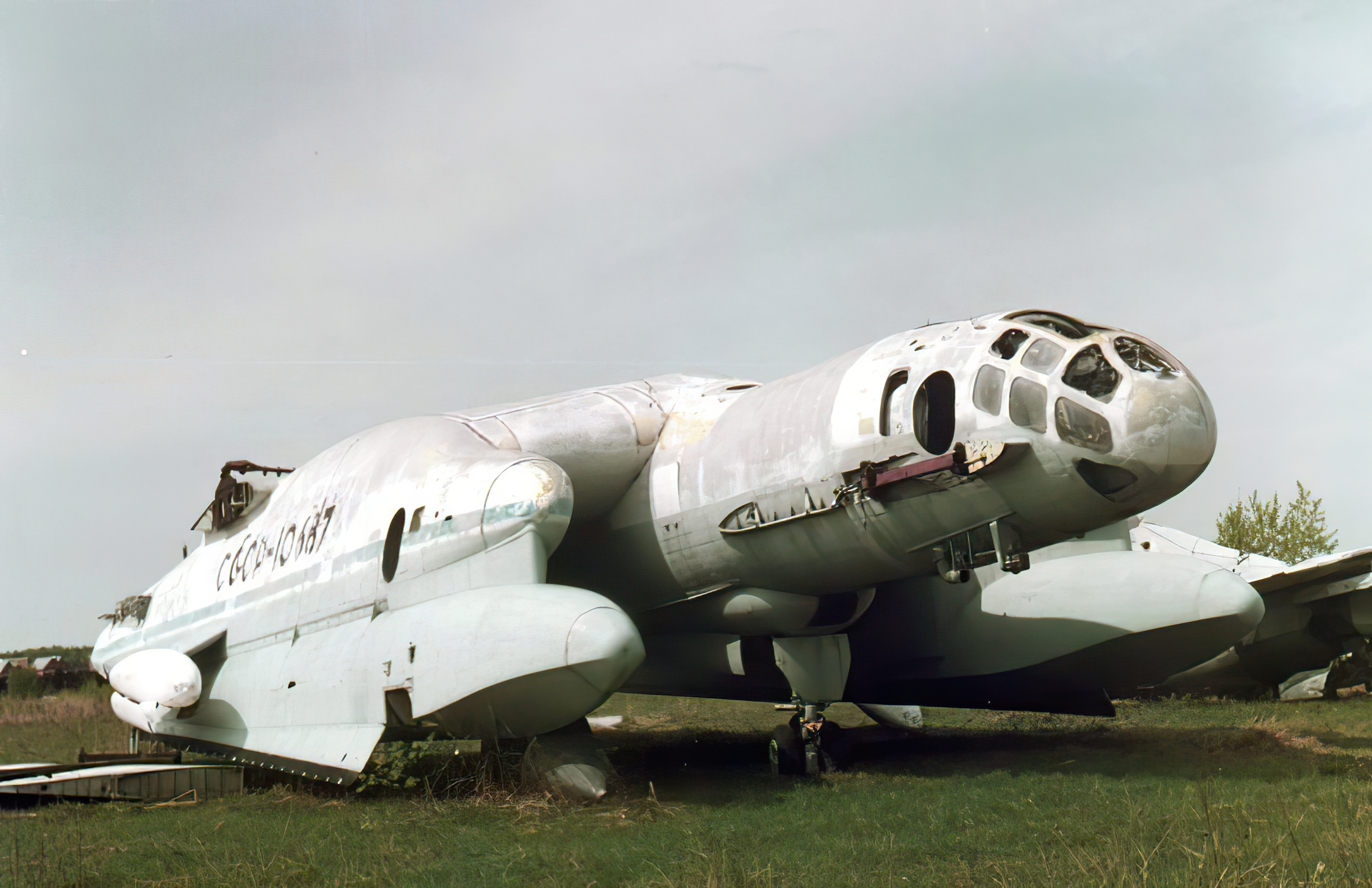
- Survivor in dilapidated condition (wings removed)

General information
- Type: Amphibious ASW aircraft
- National origin: Soviet Union
- Manufacturer: Beriev
- Designer: Robert Bartini
- Status: Retired
- Number built: 2 prototypes

History
- First flight: 4 September 1972
- Retired: 1987

The Bartini Beriev VVA-14 Vertikaľno-Vzletayushchaya Amfibiya (vertical take-off amphibious aircraft) was a wing-in-ground-effect aircraft developed in the Soviet Union during the early 1970s. Designed to be able to take off from the water and fly at high speed over long distances, it was to make true flights at high altitude, but also have the capability of flying efficiently just above the sea surface, using the aerodynamic ground effect. The VVA-14 was designed by Austro-Hungarian-born designer Robert Bartini in answer to a perceived requirement to destroy United States Navy Polaris missile submarines. The final aircraft was retired in 1987.

== Development ==
Bartini, in collaboration with the Beriev Design Bureau intended to develop the prototype VVA-14 in three phases. The VVA-14M1 was to be an aerodynamics and technology testbed, initially with rigid pontoons on the ends of the central wing section, and later with these replaced by inflatable pontoons. The VVA-14M2 was to be more advanced, with two starting engines to blast into the cavity under the wing to give lift and later with a battery of lift engines to give VTOL capability, and with fly-by-wire flight controls. The VVA-14M3 would see the VTOL vehicle fully equipped with armament and with the Burevestnik computerised anti-submarine warfare (ASW) system, Bor-1 magnetic anomaly detector (MAD) and other operational equipment.

== Operational history ==
After extensive research, including the development of the small prototype Be-1 wing in ground effect aircraft, the first VVA-14 prototype was completed in 1972. Its first flight was from a conventional runway on 4 September 1972.

Due to the project's secrecy, the aircraft was painted with a civilian registration and an Aeroflot paint scheme to avoid being perceived as a military aircraft.

In 1974, inflatable pontoons were installed, though their operation caused many problems. Flotation and water taxi tests followed, culminating in the start of flight testing of the amphibious aircraft on 11 June 1975.

The inflatable pontoons were later replaced by rigid pontoons, while the fuselage was lengthened and the starting engines added. This incarnation was given the designation 14M1P. The bureau supplying the intended battery of 12 RD-36-35PR lift engines did not deliver, and this made VTOL testing impossible.

After Bartini's death in 1974, the project slowed and eventually drew to a close, the aircraft having conducted 107 flights, with a total flight time of 103 hours. The only remaining VVA-14, No. 1972, was retired and sent to the Soviet Central Air Force Museum in 1987. As a result of accidents during shipping, the aircraft sustained damage that went unrepaired. The aircraft still resides at the museum in a dismantled state, where it still carries the Soviet registration number CCCP-10687 and the Aeroflot markings still remain as of today.

== Specifications (VVA-14M1) ==
Data from

General characteristics

- Crew: 3
- Length: 25.97 m (85 ft 2 in)
- Wingspan: 30 m (98 ft 5 in)
- Height: 6.79 m (22 ft 3 in)
- Wing area: 217.79 m^{2} (2,344.3 sq ft)
- Empty weight: 23,236 kg (51,227 lb)
- Gross weight: 52,000 kg (114,640 lb)
- Powerplant: 2 × Soloviev D-30M turbofan engines, 67 kN (15,000 lbf) thrust each (Cruise)
- Powerplant: 12 × Rybinsk RD-36-35PR turbofan lift engines, 43 kN (9,700 lbf) thrust each (VTOL - not fitted)

Performance

- Maximum speed: 760 km/h (470 mph, 410 kn)
- Cruise speed: 640 km/h (400 mph, 350 kn)
- Range: 2,450 km (1,520 mi, 1,320 nmi)
- Service ceiling: 8,000–10,000 m (26,000–33,000 ft)

== See also ==
Related development

- Beriev Be-1
- Beriev Be-2500
- Bartini A-2500
