= Chyetverikov ARK-3 =

Multi-role flying boat

ARK-3

General information
- Type: Arctic Multi-role Flying Boat
- National origin: Soviet Union
- Manufacturer: OKB Chyetverikov
- Designer: Igor Vyacheslavovich Chyetverikov
- Number built: 7

History
- First flight: 1936

The Chyetverikov ARK-3 (ARKtichyeskii - arctic) was a multi-role flying boat designed for Arctic operations that was built in the Soviet Union from 1933. It featured a conventional flying boat hull, with high cantilever wings equipped with floats at mid-span. The two piston engines were mounted in tractor-pusher fashion on a pylon above the fuselage.

== Development ==
In 1933 Chyetverikov had the design for a compact twin engined flying-boat ready for further development, which he proposed to the Glavsyevmorput (Glavsyevmorput – chief administration of northern sea routes) as a multi-role Arctic aircraft, and an order for a prototype was made, setting up Chyetverikov in his own OKB (design bureau).

The ARK-3 was of mixed construction, with a 14-metre (45.9 ft) long Duralumin stressed skin fuselage; wooden wings of MOS-27 aerofoil section; duralumin tubing tail surfaces; and ailerons with fabric covering. The dual control enclosed cockpit housed two pilots sided by side with two gunners/observers in bow and dorsal positions. Strut-supported wooden floats, at approximately half-span; and a pylon-supported engine nacelle housing tandem radial engines with Townend ring cowlings; completed the structural elements, built with a safety factor of 5.5.

Flight- and sea trials in 1936 revealed weaknesses in the bows, floats and engine nacelle pylon, which were all strengthened. Performance was deemed to be good, prompting an order for a second prototype with the fuselage lengthened by 60 centimetres (24 in) to 14.6 metres (47.9 ft) and a slightly enlarged wing; this was designated ARK-3-2 and the first prototype was re-designated ARK-3-1. A production order for five aircraft was placed, with production commencing immediately.

On 14 July 1937 the ARK-3-1 was destroyed following a structural failure; the ARK-3-2 was destroyed exactly one year later and the programme was cancelled.

== Variants ==
ARK-3-1
The first prototype ARK-3 renamed after the second prototype was ordered
ARK-3-2
The second prototype ARK-3 with more powerful engines, longer hull, increased wing chord and manual guns fitted in a manual gun turret in the bows and a dorsal sliding hatch.
ARK-3 MP2
Designation of the five production aircraft and the initial designation of the first prototype.

Chyetverikov ARK-3

== Specifications (ARK-3-2) ==
Data from Gunston, Bill. The Osprey Encyclopaedia of Russian Aircraft 1875 – 1995. London, Osprey. 1995. ISBN 1-85532-405-9

General characteristics

- Crew: 4
- Capacity: 10 pax
- Length: 14.6 m (47 ft 11 in)
- Wingspan: 20 m (65 ft 7.4 in)
- Wing area: 59.5 m^{2} (640 sq ft)
- Empty weight: 3,642 kg (8,029 lb)
- Gross weight: 5,600 kg (12,346 lb)
- Powerplant: 2 × Shvetsov M-25A , 544.36 kW (730 hp) each

Performance

- Maximum speed: 320 km/h (199 mph, 173 kn)
- Range: 1,500 km (932 mi, 810 nmi)
- Service ceiling: 8,500 m (27,890 ft)
- Rate of climb: 4.76 m/s (937.4 ft/min)

Armament

- 1 x machine gun in a manually operated bow turret.
- 1 x machine-gun in a dorsal sliding hatch
