= Vladimir Yermolaev =

Soviet aerospace engineer (1909–1944)

Vladimir Grigoryevich Yermolaev
- Владимир Григорьевич Ермолаев
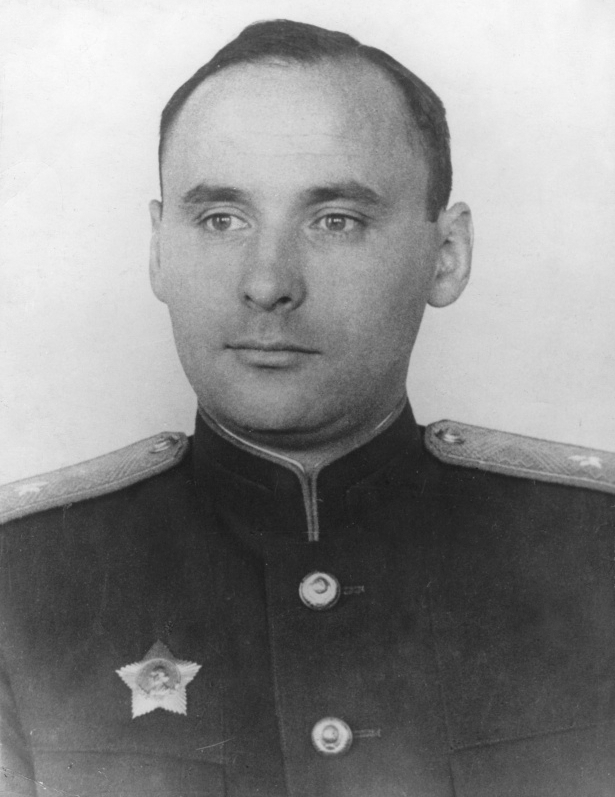
- Born: 29 August 1909
- Died: 31 December 1944 (aged 35)
- Occupation: aircraft designer
- Awards: Order of Suvorov

Vladimir Grigoryevich Yermolaev (Russian: Владимир Григорьевич Ермолаев; 29 August 1909 – 31 December 1944) was a Soviet aircraft designer, general-major of the aviation engineering service. He graduated from the Moscow State University in 1931.

Yermolaev was a leading engineer in development of the Bartini "Stal-7" aircraft. Yermolayev became the chief of OKB-240 in 1939, after Bartini was arrested and interned in a Siberian Gulag; he led the development and production of Stal-7–based long-range bomber DB-240/Yer-2/Yer-4 and its variants with Charomskiy ACh-30 diesel engines.

Yermolaev died in 1944 due to a typhoid infection.

== Aircraft ==
- Yermolaev Yer-2

== See also ==
- Yermolaev Design Bureau
