= Bartini Stal-6 =

Soviet single-engine experimental aircraft

Stal-6
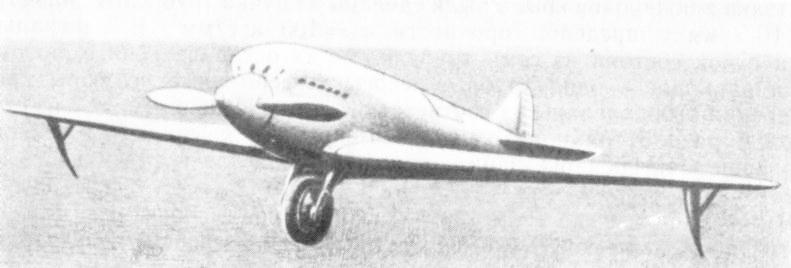

General information
- Type: Experimental
- National origin: USSR
- Manufacturer: OOS
- Designer: Roberto L. Bartini
- Number built: 1

History
- First flight: Autumn 1933

The Bartini Stal-6, was a single-engined experimental aircraft designed, built and tested in the USSR from 1930.

== Development ==
After joining the OOS (Otdel Opytnogo Samolyetostroeniya - section for experimental aircraft construction), Bartini was appointed leader of his own design group, where he attempted to design the fastest, most advanced machine possible. After submission of his proposal to TsKB (Tsentrahl'noye konstrooktorskoye byuro - central construction bureau), there was an 18-month delay before permission was given to proceed. The major component of the Stal-6 was the V-1570 Curtiss Conqueror steam-cooled V-12 engine, this was closely cowled and defined the maximum sectional area of the fuselage, which transitioned smoothly from nose to tail with a flush cockpit canopy. The manually retractable undercarriage consisted of a single main-wheel and skids at the wing-tips. To eliminate the drag of radiators the wings were double skinned with 'enerzh-6' (stainless steel), from the leading-edge back to the main-spar, to form the surface-evaporation radiators for the steam cooling system of the engine.

Flight testing began in the autumn of 1933 piloted by A.B.Yumashyev and P.M.Stefanovskii, revealing exceptional performance and setting a Soviet speed record, but severe problems with the steam cooling system as well as the bad view from the cockpit were insurmountable. The need for steam cooling was soon to be negated by the widespread availability of ethylene glycol-based coolants, which had a better specific heat and a much higher boiling point.

== Variants ==
=== Stal-8 ===
The Stal-8 was a fighter developed from the preceding Stal-6 experimental aircraft. The Curtiss Conqueror steam-cooled V-12 engine was replaced by an M-100A (licence-built Hispano-Suiza 12YBR), this also was closely cowled and defined the maximum sectional area of the fuselage, which transitioned smoothly from nose to tail except for the cockpit which was enlarged to improve the view of the pilot. Two 7.62mm ShKAS machine-guns were to be fitted in the top decking over the engine, synchronised to fire through the propeller.

Construction of the prototype, with steel tube fuselage covered with plywood skinning and steel tube built up wings, with the 'enerzh' double skinned surface-evaporation radiators forming the leading edge skin, back to the main-spars, was approximately 90% finished when the Soviet Air Force rejected the aircraft on grounds of vulnerability of the cooling system.

== Specifications (Stal-6) ==
Data from Encyclopaedia of Russian Aircraft 1875-1995

General characteristics

- Crew: 1
- Length: 6.88 m (22 ft 6.75 in)
- Wingspan: 9.0 m (29 ft 6.75 in)
- Wing area: 14.3 m^{2} (154 sq ft)
- Empty weight: 850 kg (1,874 lb)
- Gross weight: 1,080 kg (2,381 lb)
- Powerplant: 1 × V-1570 Curtiss Conqueror , 469.8 kW (630 hp)

Performance

- Maximum speed: 420 km/h (261 mph, 227 kn)
- Rate of climb: 21 m/s (4,135 ft/min)

== See also ==
- List of aircraft
