= Beriev Be-8 =

Amphibious aircraft

Be-8
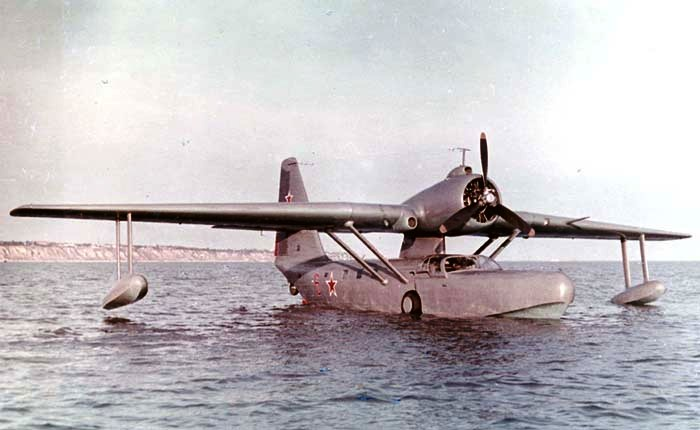

General information
- Type: Airliner
- Manufacturer: Beriev
- Status: Did not enter mass-production
- Number built: 2

History
- First flight: 3 December 1947

The Beriev Be-8 (USAF/DoD reporting name "Type 33", NATO reporting name "Mole"), was built by the Soviet Beriev OKB in 1947. It was a passenger/liaison amphibian aircraft with a layout similar to the Be-4 but substantially larger and heavier. It was a single engined parasol winged aircraft, with the wing installed on a thin pylon and two pairs of short struts. Compared to the Be-4, the Be-8 was equipped with retractable landing gear, with cockpit and passenger cabins heated by an engine exhaust heat exchanger. The Be-8 was intended as a civil aircraft and carried no armament. First flight was on 3 December 1947, demonstrating good performance and of the two prototypes, one was demonstrated during the 1951 Soviet Aviation Day at Tushino.

One Be-8 was equipped with hydrofoils, developed at TsAGI. These "Underwater Wings" were installed on landing gear struts and raised the aircraft above the water, well before the aerodynamic lift could support the aircraft. As a result, takeoff was much easier and imposed less punishment on the hull from the waves. Despite being very effective during take-off, the hydrofoils resulted in increased drag and a reduction in maximum airspeed. Construction of retractable hydrofoils was not ready, and the concept did not find practical applications.

== Specifications (Be-8) ==
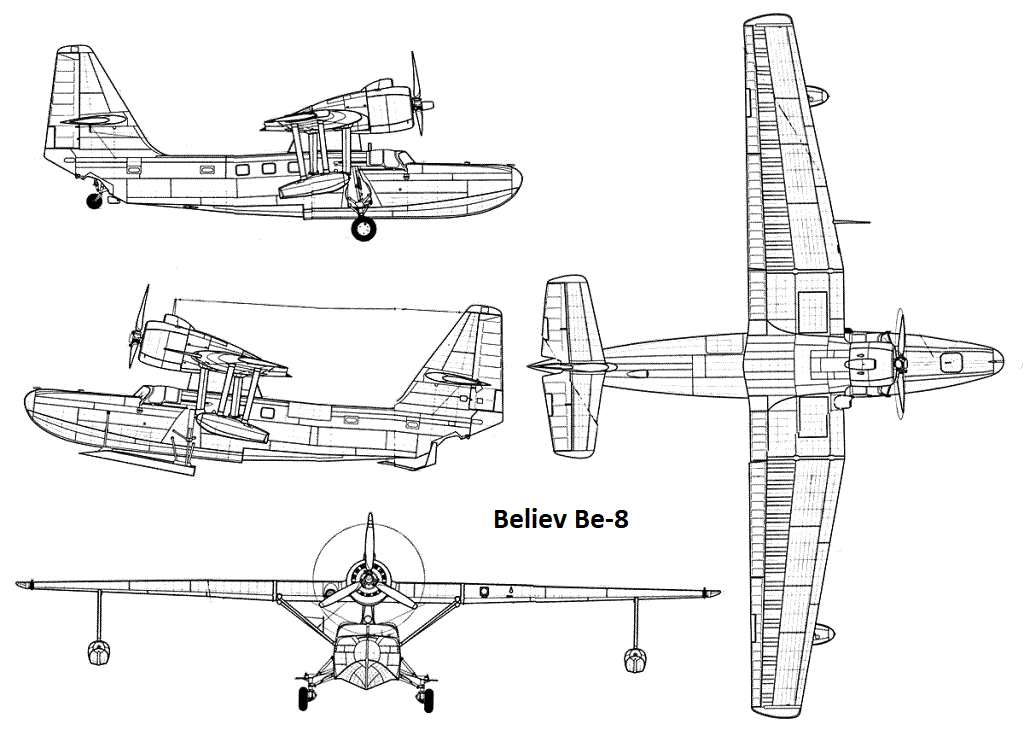

Data from The Osprey Encyclopedia of Russian Aircraft 1875–1995

General characteristics

- Crew: 2
- Capacity: 6 passengers
- Length: 13.0 m (42 ft 8 in)
- Wingspan: 19.0 m (62 ft 4 in)
- Wing area: 40 m^{2} (430 sq ft)
- Empty weight: 2,815 kg (6,206 lb)
- Gross weight: 3,624 kg (7,990 lb)
- Fuel capacity: 352 kg (776 lb)
- Powerplant: 1 × Shvetsov ASh-21 seven-cylinder air-cooled radial engine, 520 kW (700 hp)
- Propellers: 3-bladed VISh constant speed, 3 m (9 ft 10 in) diameter

Performance

- Maximum speed: 266 km/h (165 mph, 144 kn) at 1,800 m (5,900 ft)
- Cruise speed: 220 km/h (140 mph, 120 kn)
- Range: 1,205 km (749 mi, 651 nmi)
- Service ceiling: 5,500 m (18,000 ft)
