= Galina Yermolayeva =

Galina Yermolayeva may refer to:

- Galina Yermolayeva (cyclist) (born 1937), Soviet cyclist
- Galina Yermolayeva (rower) (born 1948), Soviet rower
