= Sky Manor Airport (New Jersey) =

- IATA: none; ICAO: KN40; FAA LID: N40

Summary
- Airport type: Public
- Operator: Sky Manor Airport Partners, LLC
- Serves: Hunterdon County
- Location: Alexandria Township, New Jersey
- Elevation AMSL: 560 ft / 170.7 m
- Coordinates: 40°33′59″N 074°58′43″W
- Website: http://www.skymanorairport.com/

Map
- Interactive map of Sky Manor Airport

Runways
Direction	Length		Surface
Direction	ft	m	Surface
7/25	2,900	884	Asphalt

Statistics (2010)
- Aircraft operations: 22,111
- Based aircraft: 105
- Source: Federal Aviation Administration

Sky Manor Airport (FAA LID: N40) is a public airport located 2 miles (3.2 km) southwest of Pittstown, serving Hunterdon County, New Jersey, United States. The airport has one runway and is mostly used for general aviation.

== History ==
The airport was owned by the Theisz family for many years. It was sold to the Kouba family in 1963. Sky Manor was a grass strip at that time. The Kouba family legally battled to move the encroaching electrical power lines further north, and won the court case. The runway was then relocated about 300 yards further south, leveled out and paved. The runway lights were installed during that time. The airport was bought by the Teri family in 1971, who sold it to Kent Linn in 1978.

The current owner and operator of the airport is Sky Manor Airport Partners, LLC, a 22-partner organization which acquired the property in November 2008 and increased to 40 owner-operators in 2015.

== Facilities ==
Sky Manor Airport has one runway:

- Runway 7/25: 2,900 x 50 ft (884 x 15 m), surface: asphalt

There is a restaurant on the field which is open six days a week (closed Tuesdays).

A restored 1924 airway beacon was installed in 2015.
