= Beriev =

Russian aircraft company

Beriev Aircraft Company

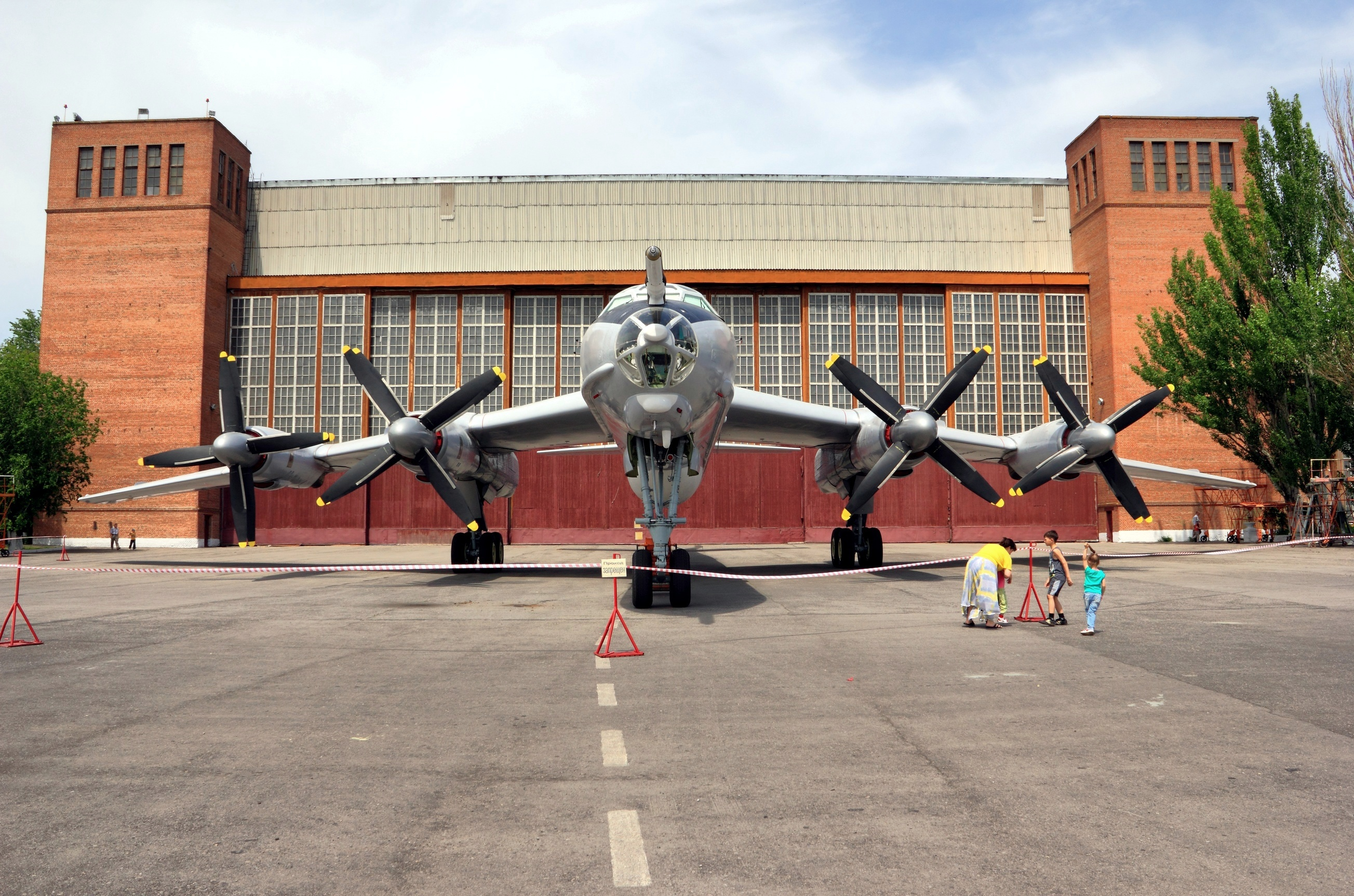
- Type: Joint-stock company
- Industry: Aerospace
- Founded: 1934; 92 years ago
- Founder: Georgy Beriev
- Headquarters: HQ and production facilities at the South Taganrog Airport (Аэропорт Таганрог-Южный) - URRT, in the outskirts of Taganrog, Russia 47°11′56.36″N 38°50′42″E
- Key people: Mikhail V. Grezin, Executive Director; Nikolay A. Lavro, Chief Designer
- Products: Aircraft, primarily seaplanes
- Parent: United Aircraft Corporation
- Website: www.uacrussia.ru/en

The PJSC Beriev Aircraft Company (Russian: Таганрогский авиационный научно-технический комплекс им. Г. М. Бериева, lit. 'Beriev Taganrog Aviation Scientific Technical Complex'), formerly Beriev Design Bureau, is a Russian aircraft manufacturer (design office prefix Be), specializing in amphibious aircraft.

The company was founded in Taganrog in 1934 as OKB-49 by Georgy Mikhailovich Beriev, and since that time has designed and produced more than 20 different models of aircraft for civilian and military purposes, as well as customized models. Today the company employs some 3000 specialists and is developing and manufacturing amphibious aircraft.

Pilots flying Beriev seaplanes have broken 228 world aviation records, which are registered and acknowledged by the Fédération Aéronautique Internationale.

== History ==
Georgy Mikhailovich Beriev founded the design bureau that bears his name at Taganrog in 1932. The traditional focus of the Beriyev Design Bureau has been the development of seaplanes for military and civilian use. The Bureau was moved to Krasnoyarsk in Siberia in 1942 to avoid destruction in World War II, and returned to Taganrog in 1945. In November 1989, Beriev became the only defense industry enterprise to win the Prize for Quality awarded by the Soviet Government.

== Aircraft ==
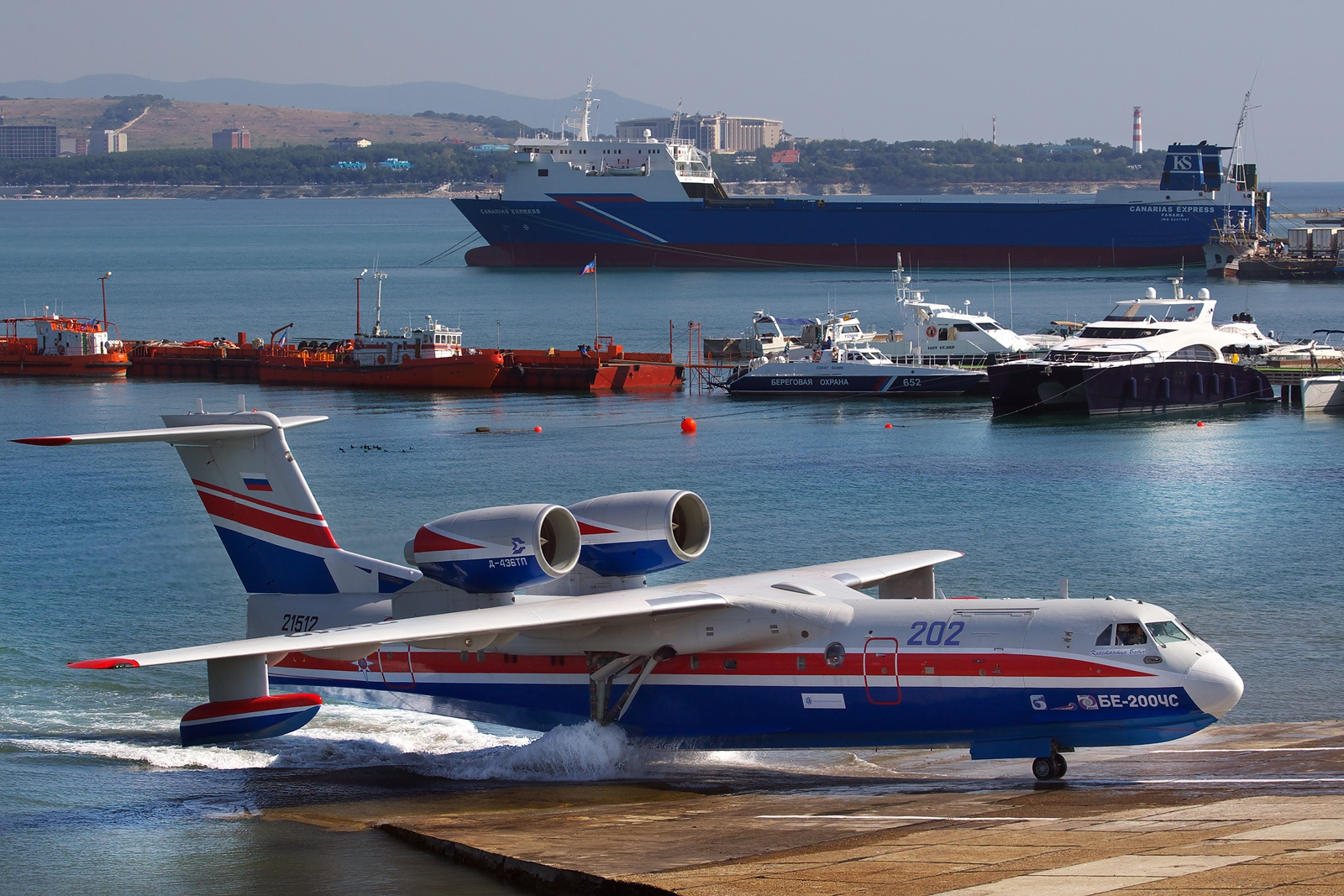
Beriev Be-200, amphibious airplane

- Beriev MBR-2/MP-1, multi-purpose flying boat, 1935
- Beriev Be-2/KOR-1/KR-2, reconnaissance seaplane, 1936; NATO codename "Mote"
- Beriev Be-4, reconnaissance seaplane, 1940
- Beriev MBR-7, prototype short-range reconnaissance/bomber flying boat, 1937
- Beriev MDR-5, long-range reconnaissance/bomber flying boat, 1938
- Beriev B-10, high-speed fighter project, 1939
- Beriev Be-4/KOR-2, parasol-wing flying boat, 1940; NATO codename "Mug"
- Beriev Be-5/KOR-3, three-seat, single engine, catapult-launched seaplane, not built
- Beriev MDR-8, unbuilt long-range reconnaissance aircraft, 1939
- Beriev MDRT, long-range maritime reconnaissance/torpedo bomber, 1940
- Beriev BB-282F, twin-engine armored bomber, 1942
- Beriev MDR-10, long-range maritime reconnaissance, 1942
- Beriev LL-143, prototype twin-engine flying boat, precursor of Be-6, 1945
- Beriev Be-8, passenger/liaison amphibian, 1947; NATO codename "Mole" or "Mode"
- Beriev Printsessa, projected large six-engine passenger/patrol flying boat, 1947
- Beriev Be-6, flying boat used for firefighting duty, 1949; NATO codename "Madge"
- Beriev R-1, experimental jet-powered flying boat, 1952
- Beriev Be-1, prototype wing-in-ground effect (WIG) aircraft, 1956
- Beriev Be-10/M-10, jet-engined flying boat, 1956; NATO codename "Mallow"
- Beriev Be-12/M-12 Chayka, Amphibious aircraft, similar in function to the Canadair CL-415, used for anti-submarine warfare, based upon the Be-6, 1960; NATO codename "Mail"
- Beriev Be-16, heavy military transport project, 1959
- An-Be-20, projected 1960s trijet regional airliner developed in cooperation with Antonov; cancelled in favor of the Yakovlev Yak-40
- Beriev S-13, a clone of the Lockheed U-2 reconnaissance plane, 1961.
- Beriev Be-24, amphibious airliner project, 1963
- Beriev Be-26, projected amphibious ASW aircraft
- Beriev Be-30, light single-engine airliner project, 1965
- Beriev Be-32, VTOL aircraft in various configurations, 1965
- Beriev Be-30, regional airliner and utility transport aircraft, 1967; NATO codename "Cuff"
- Beriev Be-40, airliner project, 1968
- Antonov An-30, aerial cartography development of the Antonov An-24, 1971
- Bartini Beriev VVA-14, an amphibious anti-submarine aircraft, only prototypes were produced, 1972
- Beriev Be-32, a multipurpose airplane meant for cargo/passenger transport, patrol and expeditions. Modernized version of Be-30, 1976
- Tupolev Tu-142MR, Tu-142MK's modified by Beriev as submarine communications relay aircraft, 1977
- Beriev A-50 Shmel, a modified Ilyushin Il-76 modified into an AWACS role, 1985; NATO codename "Mainstay"
- Beriev A-60, an Ilyushin Il-76 converted into an airborne laser laboratory, 1981
- Beriev A-40 Albatros, the largest multipurpose amphibian airplane in the world, 1986; NATO codename "Mermaid". Cancelled due to the breakup of the Soviet Union, but later revived as the A-42.
- Beriev A-42 Albatros, prototype SAR variant of A-40, 1990. Combined with the A-44 in 1993 to form a multi-role aircraft. Prototype finished in 2006 and an R&D agreement signed by the Defense Ministry, but was cancelled in 2011. In 2019, the Russian Navy announced an order for three A-42s.
- Beriev A-44, military patrol version of A-42, 1990. Combined with the A-42 in 1993.
- Beriev Be-112 proposed twin-engined propeller amphibian airplane, 1995
- Beriev Be-103 Bekas, a light amphibian, intended for passenger transport, medical aid, patrol and tourism, 1997
- Beriev Be-200 Altair, a large multipurpose amphibian airplane, 1998
- Beriev Be-115, amphibious aircraft project, 1999
- Beriev A-100, a modified Ilyushin Il-76MD-90A AWACS that will succeed the A-50 and A-50U, 2017
- Beriev Be-101 proposed single-engine light amphibian
- Beriev Be-2500 Neptun, a proposed super-heavy amphibian cargo aircraft with a max takeoff weight of 2500 metric tons (planned)

== Operation ==
Be-200 (Irkut Corporation), Be-103 (Komsomolsk-on-Amur Aircraft Plant) are produced here.

In 2007 the company's revenue amounted to 1.616 billion rubles (in 2006 — 2.011 billion rubles), net profit — 14.148 million rubles (182.777 million rubles).

In 2008 revenue (excluding VAT) amounted to 1.893 billion rubles (foreign market) and 939 million rubles (domestic market). Profit from sales — 275 million rubles.

In April 2011 JSC TAVIA was joined to JSC Beriev TANTK.

== Directors ==
Chief Designers of the Joint Design Bureau of Marine Aircraft Engineering (OKB MS):

- 1934–1968 — G. M. Beriev
- 1968–1990 — A. K. Konstantinov
- 1990–1994 — G. S. Panatov

Director of the Taganrog Machine-Building Plant:

- 1973–1985 — I. E. Yesaulenko

Heads of G. M. Beriev TANTK:

- 1994–2002 — G. S. Panatov (General Designer and CEO)
- 2002–2003 — V. V. Boev (CEO)
- 2003–2014 — V. A. Kobzev (CEO, since November 2007 CEO-General Designer)
- 2014–2015 — I. B. Garivadsky (CEO-General Designer)
- 2015–2019 — Yu. V. Grudinin (CEO-General Designer)
- 2019–2020 — M. V. Grezin (Managing Director)
- 2020–2021 — M. M. Tikhonov (Managing Director)
- 2021–present — P. V. Pavlov (Managing Director)
