= Chyetverikov MDR-3 =

MDR-3

General information
- Type: Arctic Transport Flying Boat
- National origin: USSR
- Manufacturer: Chyetverikov
- Designer: Igor Vyacheslavovich Chyetverikov
- Number built: 2

History
- First flight: January 1932
- Variant: Tupolev ANT-27, Tupolev MDR-4, Tupolev MTB-1

The MDR-3 (a.k.a.11) was a long-range flying boat prototype designed and built in the USSR from 1931.

== Development ==
In 1931, Chyetverikov was commissioned to design a new long-range flying boat for MA (Morskaya Aviatsiya – naval aviation). Chyetverikov used few new parts, borrowing wings, tailplane and engine nacelles (mounted above the wing) from the Grigorovich TB-5 and a scaled-up Grigorovich ROM-2 fuselage. The use of ready designed or built components led to quick construction of the prototype which was ready for flight tests in Dec 1931. Tests commenced in January 1932 after the aircraft was transported to Sevastopol in the Crimea. Despite fast construction and excellent structural qualities, results of the flight tests were disappointing. Takeoff time was 36 seconds, climb rate less than a metre per second and the ceiling was only 2,200m. As a result, the project was transferred to KOSOS (Konstrooktorskiy Otdel Sektora Opytnovo Stroitel'stva – section of experimental aeroplane construction), as there was now a lack of faith in Chyetverikov's abilities to rectify the poor test performance. The MDR-3 became the basis of the ANT-27, MDR-4 and MTB-1.

== Specifications (MDR-3) ==
Data from Gunston, Bill. “The Osprey Encyclopaedia of Russian Aircraft 1875–1995”. London, Osprey. 1995. ISBN 1-85532-405-9

General characteristics

- Crew: six
- Length: 21.9 m (71 ft 10.5 in)
- Wingspan: 32.2 m (105 ft 7.75 in)
- Wing area: 153 m^{2} (1,649 sq ft)
- Empty weight: 8,928 kg (19,683 lb)
- Gross weight: 13,973 kg (30,805 lb)
- Powerplant: 4 × BMW VI , 507 kW (680 hp) each

Performance

- Maximum speed: 210 km/h (130.5 mph, 113.4 kn)
- Range: 1,600 km (1,000 mi, 870 nmi)
- Service ceiling: 2,200 m (7,218 ft)
- Rate of climb: 4.76 m/s (937.4 ft/min)

Armament

- 1 × machine gun in a nose mounting.
- 1 × machine-gun in a dorsal mounting.

== See also ==
- List of flying boats and floatplanes
- Short Knuckleduster
