= OKB =

Type of closed research institutions in the Soviet Union

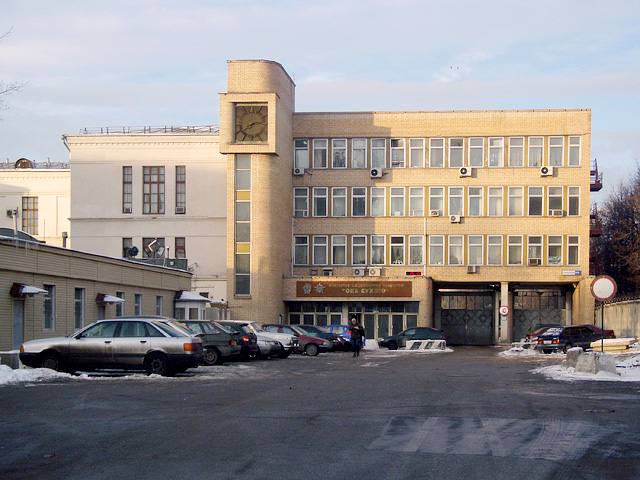
JSC Sukhoi/Sukhoi OKB head office

OKB (Russian: ОКБ) is a transliteration of the Russian initials for "Опытно-Конструкторское Бюро" (Opytno-Konstruktorskoye Byuro), which translates to "Experimental Design Bureau". It could also mean Osoboye konstruktorskoye byuro ("Special Design Bureau" in English). During the Soviet era, OKBs were closed institutions working on design and prototyping of advanced technology, usually for military applications. The corresponding English-language term for such a bureau's activity is "R&D" or "research and development".

For security, each bureau was officially identified only by a number, but semi-official use often referenced the name of each establishment's lead designer. For example, OKB-51, led by Pavel Sukhoi, eventually became known as simply "Sukhoi". Successful and famous bureaus often retained these names after the departure of their founding designer.

After the 1991 collapse of the Soviet Union, many OKBs became Scientific Production Associations (NPOs). There were some attempts to merge them in the 1990s, and widespread amalgamations took place in 2001–2006 to form "national champion" corporations (such as Almaz-Antey to consolidate surface-to-air missile development).

== OKBs in aerospace industry ==
- KB-1 – NPO Almaz, Vitaly Shabanov
- OKB-1 – Korolev today RSC Energia
- OKB-1 – Dr. Brunolf Baade disbanded by 1953
- OKB-2 – early name of MKB Raduga (OKB-155-2)
- OKB-3 – Bratukhin
- OKB-4 – Matus Bisnovat's Design Bureau (different from NPO Molniya)
- OKB-8 – Novator (long-range SAMs)
- OKB-19 – Shvetsov, Soloviev. Now: "Perm MKB"
- OKB-20 – Klimov, Omsk-Motors
- OKB-21 – Alexeyev
- OKB-23 – Myasishchev (also OKB-482)
- OKB-24 – Mikulin
- OKB-26 – Klimov
- OKB-39 – Ilyushin
- OKB-45 – Klimov
- OKB-47 – Yakovlev originally, transferred to Aleksey Shcherbakov
- OKB-49 – Beriev
- OKB-51 – Sukhoi
- OKB-52 – Chelomei
- OKB-86 – Bartini
- OKB-115 – Yakovlev
- OKB-117 – Klimov, Izotov
- OKB-120 – Zhdanov (surname)
- OKB-124 – N/A (cooling systems for Tu-121)
- OKB-134 – Vympel
- OKB-140 – N/A (first hydro-alcohol starter-generators for Tu-121)
- OKB-153 – Antonov
- OKB-154 – Kosberg, previously OKB-296
- OKB-155 – Mikoyan (formerly Mikoyan-Gurevich)
- OKB-155-2 – (sometimes designated as OKB-2-155) OKB-155 spin-off in Dubna. Gurevich, Berezniak, Isaev... Now MKB Raduga.
- OKB-156 – Tupolev
- OKB-165 – Lyulka
- OKB-207 – Borovkov and Florov (Borovkov-Florov D, Borovkov-Florov I-207)
- OKB-240 – Yermolaev
- OKB-246 – OKBM (naval nuclear propulsion)
- OKB-256 – Tsybin
- OKB-276 – Kuznetsov
- OKB-296 – renamed to OKB-154 in 1946 KB Khimavtomatika
- OKB-300 – Tumansky
- OKB-301 – Lavochkin
- OKB-329 – Mil
- SKB-385 – Makeev
- OKG-456 – Glushko
- OKB-458 – Chetverikov
- OKB-478 – Ivchenko
- OKB-575 – Kovrov
- OKB-586 – Yangel
- OKB-692 – JSC "Khartron" (formerly KB electropriborostroeniya, then NPO "Electropribor")
- OKB-794 – Leninets
- OKB-938 – Kamov

== See also ==
- Defense industry of Russia
