= Larisa Shepitko =

Soviet filmmaker (1938–1979)

- Лариса Шепитько (Russian); Лариса Шепітько (Ukrainian)
- Born: 6 January 1938; Artemovsk, Ukrainian SSR, Soviet Union
- Died: 2 July 1979 (aged 41); Kalinin Oblast, Russian SFSR, Soviet Union
- Resting place: Kuntsevo Cemetery, Moscow, Russia
- Occupations: Film director; screenwriter
- Years active: 1956–1979
- Spouse: Elem Klimov (m. 1963)
- Children: 1

Larisa Yefimovna Shepitko (Russian: Лариса Ефимовна Шепитько, Ukrainian: Лариса Юхимівна Шепітько, romanized: Larysa Yukhymivna Shepitko; 6 January 1938 – 2 July 1979) was a Soviet film director and screenwriter of Ukrainian origin. She is considered one of the best directors of all time, with her film The Ascent being the second film directed by a woman to win a Golden Bear and the third film directed by a woman to win a top award at a major European film festival (Cannes, Venice, Berlin).

Shepitko was also considered one of the most prominent Soviet filmmakers during both the Khrushchev Thaw and the Era of Stagnation. The Khrushchev Thaw was a direct response to the limitations that were forced upon Soviet citizens during Stalin's reign, and essentially marked the inception of an innovative return to the cinematic arts. Shepitko's career was cut short in 1979 when she was killed in a car accident while scouting locations for the film Farewell. Her husband Elem Klimov created a 20-minute tribute documentary called Larisa to honor her legacy.

== Early life and education ==
Shepitko was born in Artemovsk, a town in Eastern Ukraine now known as Bakhmut. One of three children, she was raised by her mother, a schoolteacher. Her father, a military officer, divorced Shepitko's mother and abandoned his family when Larisa was very young. She recalled, "My father fought all through the war. To me, the war was one of the most powerful early impressions. I remember the feeling of life upset, the family separated. I remember hunger and how our mother and us, the three children, were evacuated. The impression of a global calamity certainly left an indelible mark in my child's mind." Because of this, her work often deals with loneliness and isolation.

In 1954, she graduated high school in Lviv. Shepitko moved to Moscow when she was sixteen, entering the All-Union State Institute of Cinematography as a student of Alexander Dovzhenko. She was a student of Dovzhenko's for 18 months until he died in 1956. She felt a kinship between their shared heritage and social realist imagery. She also adopted his motto, "Make every film as if it's your last."

Despite working in a very male dominated environment with a historical legacy of primarily male-made films to learn from, she would later state that, "I never tried to take male directors as a model, because I know only too well that any attempt by my female friends, my colleagues—both junior and senior—to imitate male filmmakers makes no sense because it’s all derivative."

== Career ==
=== Directing ===
Shepitko graduated from VGIK in 1963 with her prize winning diploma film Heat, or Znoy, made when she was 22 years old. In the film, Kemel, a recent school graduate, travels into an isolated part of the steppes to work in a small communal farm camp in Central Asia during the mid-1950s. The film was influenced by a short story, "The Camel's Eye", by Chingiz Aitmatov. Her film showed Dovzhenko's impression, both in its parched setting and its naturalistic style. During the editing phase of the film, Shepitko was helped by Elem Klimov who also was a student at VGIK at that time. The two would later marry and have a child. During the filming of Heat, Shepitko contracted Hepatitis A and oftentimes she would direct portions of the film from a stretcher. Temperatures on locations could reach upwards of 50 degrees Celsius which caused the film to melt inside of the camera numerous times. Heat won the Symposium Grand Prix ex aequo at the Karlovy Vary IFF in 1964 and an award at the All-Union Film Festival in Leningrad.

Shepitko's first post-institute film Wings concerns a much-decorated female fighter pilot of World War II. The pilot, now principal of a vocational college, is out of touch with her daughter and the new generation. She has so internalized the military ideas of service and obedience that she cannot adjust to life during peacetime. Shepitko brings to light the inner life of a middle-aged woman who must reconcile her past with her present reality. She expresses this by contrasting her character's repression, marked by claustrophobic interiors and tight compositions, with heavenly, expansive shots of sky and clouds, representing the freedom of her flying days. Actress Maya Bulgakova inhabits this stern but reasonable woman with empathy and humor. The film aroused considerable Soviet press controversy at the time, as films were not meant to depict conflicts between children and parents (Vronskaya 1972, p. 39). It started a public debate by acknowledging a generation gap and for painting a war hero as a forgotten, lost soul.

In 1967, she shot the second of the three episodes in a portmanteau film titled Beginning of an Unknown Era, made to commemorate the fiftieth anniversary of the October Revolution. Shepitko's episode, The Homeland of Electricity, follows a young engineer who brings electric power to an impoverished village. The film as a whole was judged by the authorities to show the Bolsheviks in an unflattering light, and was left unreleased. Two of the episodes, including The Homeland of Electricity, were found and shown publicly for the first time in 1987, but the film in its complete original form is believed lost.

In 1969, she shot her first color film, a musical-fantasy film titled In the 13th Hour of the Night, a New Year's revue starring Vladimir Basov, Georgy Vitsin, Zinovy Gerdt, Spartak Mishulin and Anatoly Papanov.

Shepitko's third film, You and Me, follows the lives of two male surgeons struggling with different notions of fulfillment. It is both a character study and a critique of consumerism. This was her second and last film in color. It was favorably received at the Venice Film Festival.

In 1977 Shepitko released The Ascent, her last completed film and the one which received the most attention in the West. The actors Boris Plotnikov and Vladimir Gostyukhin gained their first major roles in the film. Adapted from a novel by Vasili Bykov, Shepitko returns to the sufferings of World War II, chronicling the trials and tribulations of a group of pro-Soviet partisans in Belarus in the bleak winter of 1942. Two of the partisans, Sotnikov and Rybak, are captured by the Wehrmacht and then interrogated by a local collaborator, played by Anatoly Solonitsyn, before four of them are executed in public. This depiction of the martyrdom of the Soviets owes much to Christian iconography. The Ascent won the Golden Bear at the 27th Berlin International Film Festival in 1977. It was also the official submission of the Soviet Union for the Best Foreign Language Film of the 50th Academy Awards in 1978, and it was included in "1001 Movies You Must See Before You Die" by Steven Schneider.

Shepitko wanted the film to adhere to the authenticity of what Soviet soldiers would have experienced during World War II. The cast was derived of no-name actors whose backgrounds fit the characters she wanted them to portray. The film was shot in Murom during the severe winters of Russia where temperatures reached 40 degrees below zero. Shepitko refused any special treatment and only wore clothing that the cast wore to embody the suffering that they went through.

Shepitko's growing international reputation led to an invitation to serve on the jury at the 28th Berlin International Film Festival in 1978. Shepitko was offered a chance to direct in Hollywood, which she put off until she could improve her English. Shepitko's son Anton Klimov claims that Francis Ford Coppola screened his 1979 film Apocalypse Now to Shepitko before its release to get her thoughts on it.

=== Censorship ===
During the Soviet regime, the communist government would censor films that they did not approve of. This was the case for three of Shepitko's early films: Wings, The Homeland of Electricity, and You and Me. Wings was released to a limited audience and then later banned, The Homeland of Electricity was never shown in theaters, and You and Me was dropped and replaced from release in the Venice Film Festival by the Soviet government. She began working on the production of the film Belorussian Station in 1971 and planned to change the optimistic tone of the original tale to a more tragic one. As news got out of these plans, Mosfilm removed her from production and replaced her with a "less controversial director", Andrei Smirnov.

Censorship during this time didn't have a clear format to follow. Films were approved solely on which government official saw the film first. Elim Klimov explained that The Ascent, Shepitko's most popular film, was only released in theaters because during its screening Pyetr Masherov, the First Secretary of the Communist Party of Belorussia, "wiped away his tears and broke the crowd's stunned silence by speaking for forty minutes on the importance of the film". Masherov himself was a war veteran of the Belorussian partisan movement and related closely to what the film depicted. Within several days of the screening, The Ascent was officially accepted without any changes.

=== Acting ===
Before Shepitko directed feature-lengths, she acted in three films during her time at VGIK. She was an extra in Eldar Ryazanov's Carnival Night and played Hanna in Yuriy Lysenko's Tavriya. Lastly, she played Nina in Nikolai Litus and Igor Zemgano's Obyknovennaya istoriya. She also appeared briefly in her husband Elem Klimov's film Sport, Sport, Sport, released in 1970.

== Style and themes ==
=== Style ===
Shepitko's filmmaking style is often associated with realism, characterized by a substantial degree of naturalism that emits a genuine depiction of the subject matter she explores. Most of her films are shot in black-and-white and feature isolated settings. Her shot compositions frequently focus on body parts which creates a sense of intimacy with her characters.

Shepitko also employs grand landscape shots and the use of negative space to emphasize the isolation faced by her characters. Examples of this can be seen in The Ascent where two soldiers struggle to survive in the middle of a snowstorm, and in Wings where an ex-war pilot flies alone, illustrating her disconnect from modern society.

Shepitko's style evokes a lot of visual, poetic symbolism. Much of this style was influenced by her teacher at VGIK, Alexander Dovzhenko.

=== Themes ===
The most noticeable theme in Shepitko's filmmaking career is war. More specifically, World War II in hindsight of how it relates to the modern age. In Wings, Shepitko depicts a post-World War II setting where an ex-pilot reminisces being seen as a hero of the war. For The Ascent, Shepitko describes in an interview that the reason for her wanting to make a film actually set during World War II was because she saw its thematic substance applicable to what she sought out of the modern climate of Soviet culture: “Each time period brings certain issues to the surface, and the question of heroism in today’s times is perhaps just as burning an issue now as it was in a time of war.”

The Calvert Journal states that, "Shepitko is a political filmmaker, but one rooted firmly in humanism rather than ideology. Both Wings and The Ascent are fiercely pacifist works which explore — albeit from different angles — the tragic consequences of conflict. Heroic myths are brutally stripped away, leaving instead unapologetically unpatriotic accounts of the toxic cost of war."

According to Shepitko's husband in his Larisa tribute short film, "Larisa came close to the central theme of her work—the unsparing judgement of oneself and the great responsibility each of us has for the things we’ve done in life." This was in response to his thoughts on her film You and Me, and how from there on forward this would become the prominent exploration in her films The Ascent and Farewell.

Shepitko's films sometimes feature religious themes. The Ascent uses the story of Judas and Jesus to compare and contrast her two main characters.

== Personal life ==
=== Marriage ===
In 1963, Shepitko met Elem Klimov while finishing her film Heat. Later that year the two married. They had one child, Anton, who was born in 1973.

=== Health ===
Shepitko struggled with physical and mental health problems at various points in her life. While filming Heat, she came down with Hepatitis A and had to direct some scenes from a stretcher. The repeated censorship of her work took a toll on her mental health, leading to a breakdown and hospitalization in a sanatorium in the early 1970s. During her hospitalization, Shepitko suffered a fall that damaged her spine, which complicated her pregnancy and made the birth of her son Anton in 1973 a near-death experience.

=== Death ===
Shepitko died in a car crash on a highway near the city of Tver with four members of her shooting team in 1979 while scouting locations for her planned adaptation of the novel Farewell to Matyora by Valentin Rasputin. Andrei Tarkovsky, a fellow filmmaker and friend of Shepitko, wrote in his journal about the event after attending her funeral, "... A car accident. All killed instantly. So suddenly, that not one of them had adrenaline in the blood. It seems that the driver fell asleep at the wheel. It was early morning. Between Ostachkovo and Kalinin". Her husband, the director Elem Klimov, finished the work under the title Farewell and also made a 25-minute tribute entitled Larisa (1980).

Farewell is about a small village on a beautiful island threatened with flooding. The film follows the inhabitants and their farewell to their homeland. "Critics maintained that the final product lacked Shepitko’s unique personal vision, obviously a point of view that could never be replicated". Composer Alfred Schnittke, who had worked with Shepitko many times previously on scoring her films, dedicated his String Quartet No. 2 (1981) to Shepitko's memory.

Klimov's tribute short film Larisa claims that Shepitko had been preparing all her life to make Farewell, and that it would have certainly been the high point of her career.

The author of the novel that Farewell is based on, Valentin Rasputin, stated that, "...I wanted to try and prevent Matyora from being filmed. I wanted to preserve Matyora in its original genre, as a piece of prose, but Larisa managed to persuade me very quickly. She started describing what she imagined the future film to be like, and she was so passionate about it, so interested in it, that I completely forgot my intention not to let go of Matyora."

== Legacy ==
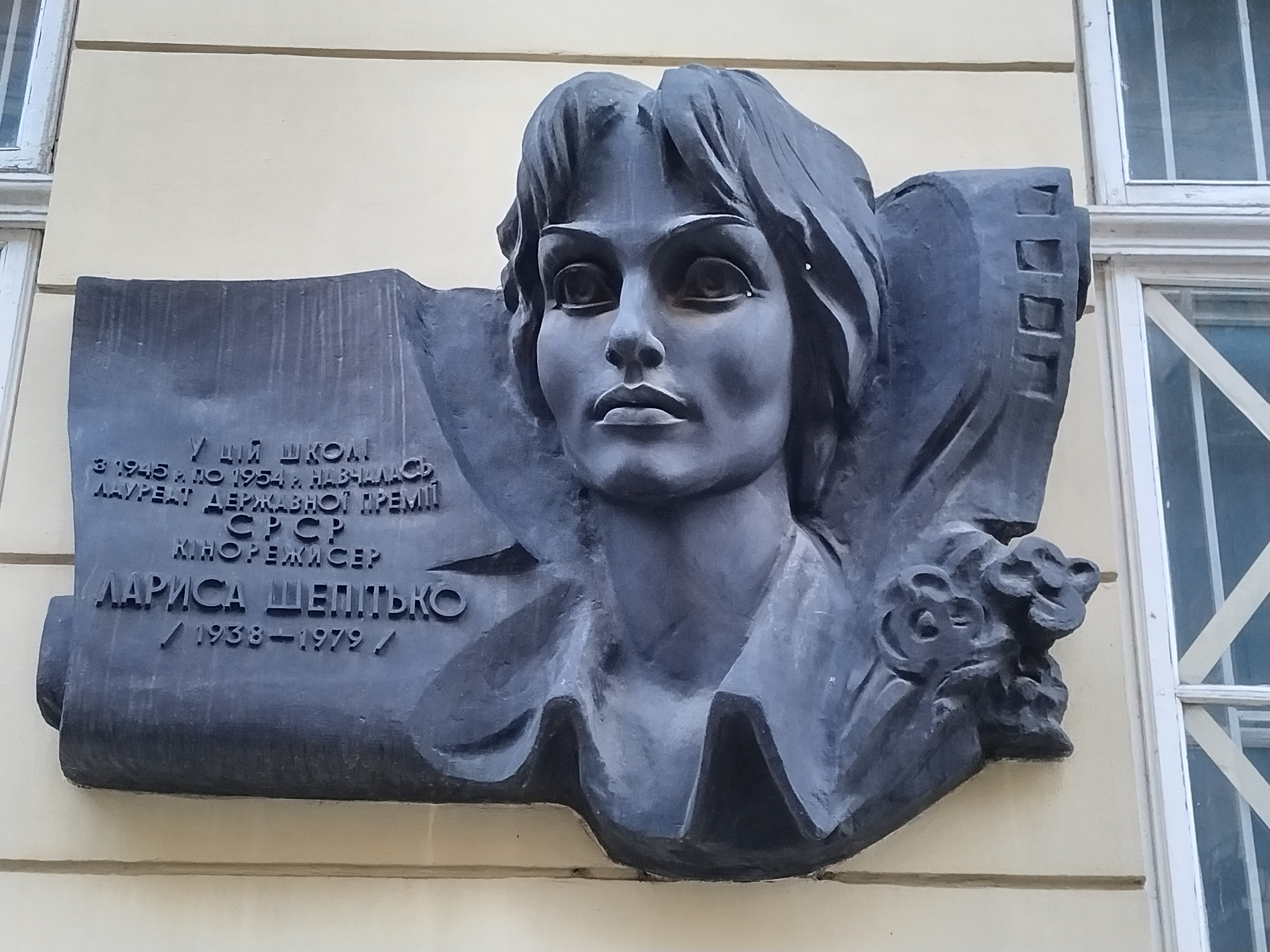
Memorial plaque to Larisa Shepitko on the street in Lviv.

In 2008, The Criterion Collection released Eclipse Series 11, which featured the work of Larisa Shepitko. The series included Wings and The Ascent. In 2021, the collection released a standalone restoration of The Ascent.

A memorial plaque was erected on Pavla Kovzhuna Street in Lviv, Ukraine, the city where Shepitko grew up.

In 2022, the Australian Cinémathèque at the Gallery of Modern Art (GOMA) in Brisbane, Australia presented a complete retrospective of Shepitko's works. The program, curated by Robert Hughes, included Shepitko's four feature films, along with Beginning of an Unknown Era and her television-movie musical revue In the Thirteenth Hour of the Night. The retrospective also showcased two films by Elem Klimov; Larisa, a tribute short commemorating Shepitko's life and legacy and Farewell, completed posthumously in her honour.

On 1 October 2025, the plaque dedicated to Shepitko was dismantled by the Stefanyk National Scientific Library in cooperation with local authorities. This was carried out as part of the broader phenomenon of removing from public space memorials to individuals associated with Russia and the Soviet Union. The plaque is to be relocated to the Territory of Terror Memorial Museum.

== Filmography ==
Shepitko made a total of five feature-length films, including a TV film In the Thirteenth Hour of the Night. She also made the second segment of the omnibus film Beginning of an Unknown Era. She died in 1979 when her last film, Farewell, just started filming. Her husband, Elem Klimov completed the film in 1981.

#	Year	Title	Role	Notes
1	1963	Heat	Director	
2	1966	Wings	Director	
3	1967	The Homeland of Electricity (second segment of Beginning of an Unknown Era)	Director	
4	1969	In the Thirteenth Hour of the Night	Director	
5	1971	You and Me	Director	
6	1977	The Ascent	Director	
7	1983	Farewell	Director	Completed by Elem Klimov after Shepitko's death

== Awards and nominations ==
Year	Award	Category	Work	Result	Notes
1977	Berlin International Film Festival	Golden Bear - Best Film	The Ascent	Won	
1977	Berlin International Film Festival	OCIC Award - Competition	The Ascent	Won	
1977	Berlin International Film Festival	FIPRESCI Prize - Competition	The Ascent	Won	
1977	Berlin International Film Festival	Interfilm Award Special Mention - Competition	The Ascent	Won	

== See also ==
- List of female directors
- Women's cinema
