= Bratsk Reservoir =

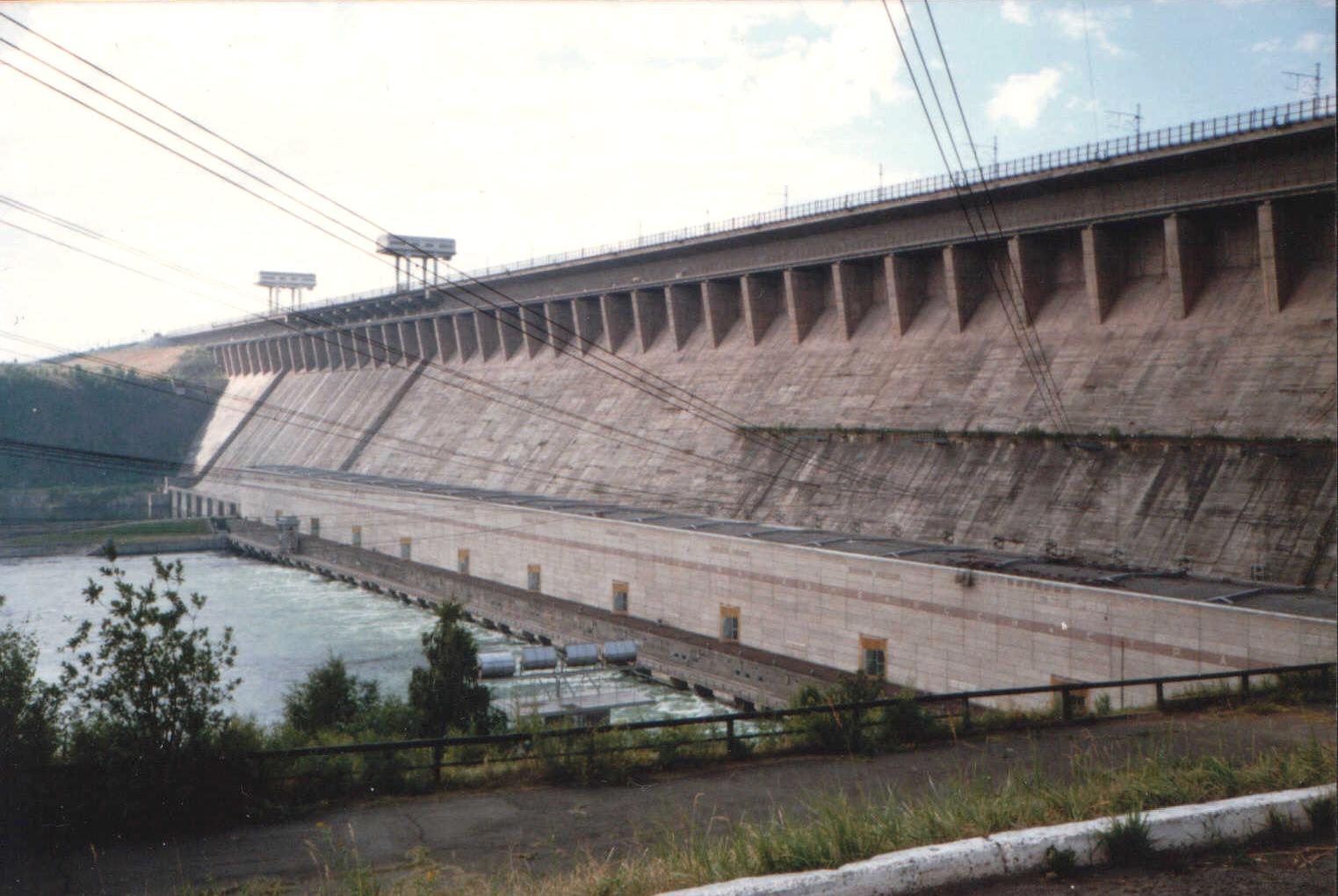

- Location within Russia
- Location: Irkutsk Oblast
- Coordinates: 56°15′N 101°45′E
- Type: Hydroelectric reservoir
- Primary inflows: Angara River
- Primary outflows: Angara River
- Basin countries: Russia
- Surface area: 5,470 square kilometres (2,110 sq mi)
- Water volume: 169.27 km^{3} (40.61 cu mi)

Bratsk Reservoir (Russian: Братское водохранилище, romanized: Bratskoye vodokhranilishche) is a reservoir on the Angara River, located in the Lena-Angara Plateau of Irkutsk Oblast, Russia. It is named after the city of Bratsk, the largest city adjacent to the reservoir. It has a surface area of 5,470 km^{2} (2,110 sq mi) and a maximum volume of 169.27×10^{12} litres (3.723×10^{13} imp gal; 4.472×10^{13} US gal).

The concrete dam of the Bratsk hydroelectric plant was completed in 1967. It is 125 metres (410 ft) high and 4,417 metres (14,491 ft) long. The Baikal Amur Mainline railroad runs along the top of the dam. Its electrical power capacity is 4,500 MW. To this day, it is classified as the second biggest dam in the world by reservoir storage capacity.

Bratsk Reservoir is multi-purpose, and used in an integrated way for hydropower, water transport, water supply, forestry, fisheries and recreation. There are 25 different kinds of fish in the reservoir, 10 are suitable for commercial purposes. The quality of the water has been classified as ranging from category 2 'clean', to category 5 'dirty', for a number of factors. Drinking water is sourced from the 'clean' zones.

== In literature ==
The epic construction of the Bratsk Dam is the subject of a long eponymous poem by Yevgeny Yevtushenko. Much later (1976), the impact of the reservoir construction on the life of the villagers upstream, many of whom had to be relocated from the flooded areas, or lost some the best lands of their collective farms, became the motive of Valentin Rasputin's novel Farewell to Matyora.
