= Come and See =

1985 film by Elem Klimov

- Russian theatrical release poster
- Directed by: Elem Klimov
- Screenplay by: Ales Adamovich; Elem Klimov
- Based on: Khatyn; I Am from the Fiery Village by Ales Adamovich (Note: The film itself does not credit any source material.)
- Starring: Aleksei Kravchenko; Olga Mironova
- Cinematography: Aleksei Rodionov
- Edited by: Valeriya Belova
- Music by: Oleg Yanchenko
- Production companies: Belarusfilm; Mosfilm
- Distributed by: Sovexportfilm
- Release date: 9 July 1985 (Moscow)
- Running time: 142 minutes
- Country: Soviet Union
- Languages: Belarusian; Russian; German
- Box office: $21 million

Come and See (Note: Russian: Иди и смотри, romanized: Idi i smotri; Belarusian: Ідзі і глядзі, romanized: Idzi i hliadzi.) (in Russian: Иди и смотри) is a 1985 Soviet epic historical anti-war film directed by Elem Klimov and starring Aleksei Kravchenko and Olga Mironova. Its screenplay, written by Klimov and Ales Adamovich, is based on the 1971 novel Khatyn (Russian: Хатынь), and the 1977 collection of survivor testimonies I Am from the Fiery Village (Russian: Я из огненной деревни, romanized: Ya iz ognennoy derevni), of which Adamovich was a co-author. Klimov had to fight eight years of censorship from the Soviet authorities before he was allowed to produce the film in its entirety.

The film's plot focuses on the German occupation of Byelorussia during World War II, and the events as witnessed by a young Belarusian teenager named Flyora, who joins a partisan unit, and thereafter depicts the Nazi atrocities and human suffering inflicted upon the populace. The film mixes hyper-realism with an underlying surrealism, and philosophical existentialism with poetical, psychological, political and apocalyptic themes. The film received positive reviews during its initial release and received the FIPRESCI prize at the 14th Moscow International Film Festival. Come and See was the final film that Klimov directed before his death in 2003.

In the decades since its release, Come and See has received widespread acclaim. The portrayal of the horror, brutality, and psychological damage caused by Nazi atrocities was praised by critics, and Kravchenko's performance has been lauded. In 2022, it was ranked the 41st greatest film of all time in the Sight & Sound directors' poll and 104th in their critics' poll.

== Plot ==
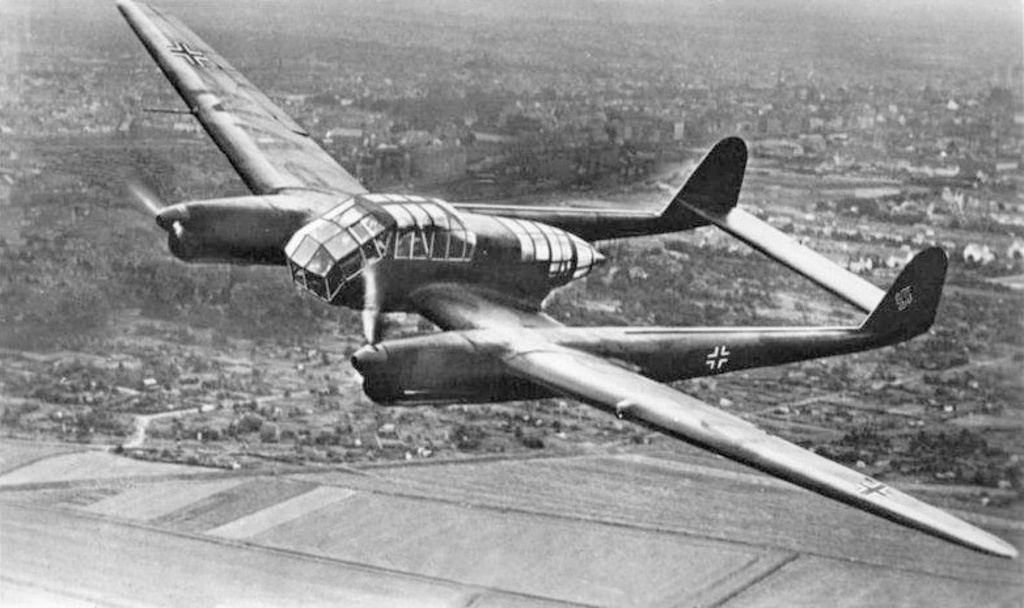
A Focke-Wulf Fw 189 Uhu. A reconnaissance aircraft of this model repeatedly appears in scenes flying above Flyora's head throughout Come and See.

In 1943, Flyora and another Belarusian boy dig up a rifle from a trench to join the Soviet partisans. They do so in defiance of their village elder, who warns them that this would arouse the suspicions of the occupying Germans. The boys' activities are noticed by a reconnaissance aircraft.

The next day, partisans arrive at Flyora's house to conscript him against his mother's wishes. He is taken to a partisan camp in the forest, where he becomes a low-rank militiaman who performs menial tasks. When the trained partisans leave to fight, their commander, Kosach, orders Flyora and several other men to remain behind at the camp. Bitterly disappointed, Flyora walks into the forest weeping. He comes across Glasha, an emotionally unstable adolescent girl working as a partisan nurse. The forest is suddenly attacked by dive bombers and German paratroopers, forcing the duo to flee. They hide from German officers passing through the forest and sleep under a tree for the night.

Glasha travels with Flyora to his village, only to find his home deserted. In denial that his family is dead, Flyora believes they are hiding on a nearby island across a bog and runs off. Glasha follows, by chance seeing a pile of executed villagers behind his house, before yelling at Flyora to leave quickly. They become hysterical after wading through the bog, where Glasha screams at Flyora that his family is dead. Rubezh, a partisan fighter, rescues them and takes them to meet the surviving villagers. The village elder, severely burned by gasoline, tells Flyora of his family's deaths and repeats his warning about digging up the rifle. Horrified, Flyora attempts suicide by submerging his head in the bog, but Glasha and the villagers stop him.

Rubezh takes Flyora and two other men to raid a warehouse for food. The group find the warehouse unexpectedly guarded by German troops and are forced to retreat, during which two of their comrades are killed by a land mine. Rubezh and Flyora coerce a Nazi-collaborating farmer to hand over his cow, but a German machine gunner kills Rubezh and the cow. Flyora attempts to steal a horse and cart from another man to transport the cow, but he convinces Flyora to hide his gun and Red Army jacket as SS troops appear. He takes Flyora to his house in Perekhody village.

German troops and collaborators surround and occupy the village. Flyora runs outside and sees women, children, and the elderly being forcibly marched down the street and warns them that they are being herded to their deaths, but he is forced into a barn church with them. He and a young woman with a child manage to escape, but the woman's child is thrown back in while she is dragged off to be gang raped. The Germans barricade the doors and windows before incinerating the church, killing everyone inside. While celebrating the massacre, a German officer holds a pistol to Flyora's head to pose for a picture, then abandons him as the soldiers leave.

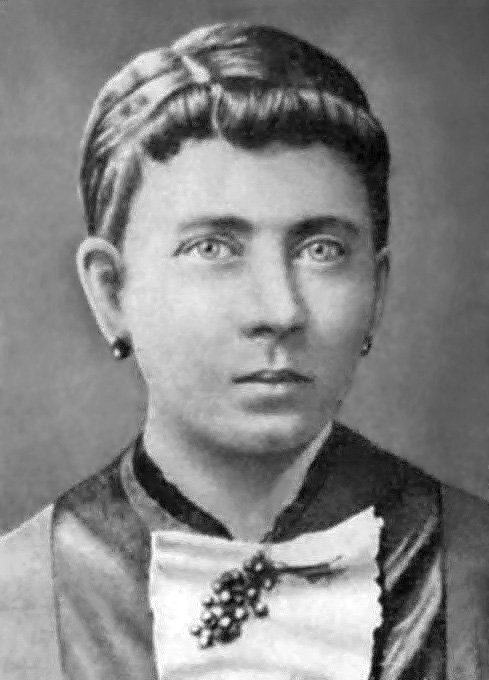
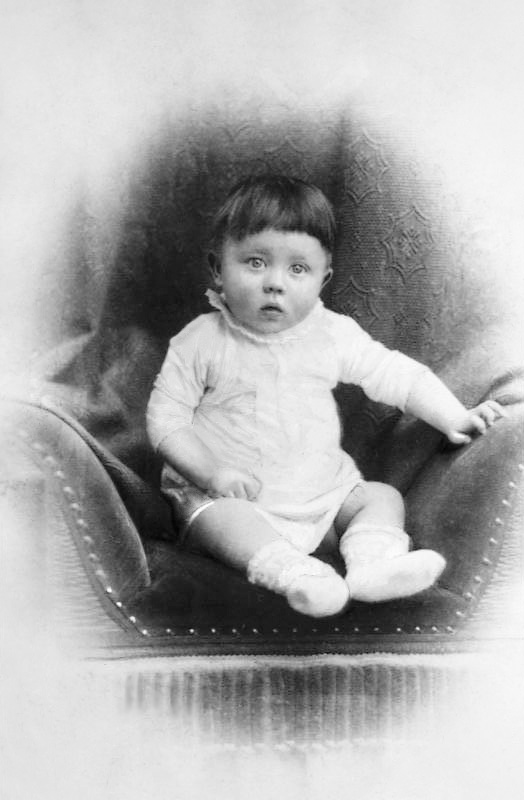
These two photos (Klara; left, and Adolf; right) were merged by Klimov to create the picture that Flyora stops shooting at.

Flyora wanders away from the scorched village, finding the aftermath of a partisan ambush on the escaping Germans. He recovers his jacket and rifle, only to spot the gang-raped woman bleeding and stumbling in a fugue state. He finds Kosach and the partisans nearby, having captured some of the Germans and their collaborators responsible for the church fire. They plead for their lives, blaming a fanatical and unapologetic Obersturmführer. Kosach suggests that one collaborator douses the others with petrol; he willingly does so, but the partisans shoot them all before they can be immolated.

As the partisans leave, Flyora notices a boy looking at a painting of Hitler in a puddle. When the boy leaves, Flyora repeatedly shoots the portrait; a montage of clips from Hitler's life plays in reverse, but when Hitler is shown as a baby on his mother's lap, Flyora stops shooting and cries. A title card reads, "628 Belorussian villages were destroyed, along with all their inhabitants". Flyora rushes to rejoin his comrades.

== Cast ==
- Aleksei Kravchenko as Flyora/Florian Gaishun
- Olga Mironova as Glasha/Glafira
- Liubomiras Laucevičius as Kosach (voiced by Valery Kravchenko)
- Vladas Bagdonas as Rubezh
- Tatyana Shestakova as Flyora's mother
- Yevgeny Tilicheyev as Gezhel the main collaborator
- Viktors Lorents as Walter Stein the German commander
- Jüri Lumiste as the fanatical German officer

== Production ==
=== Development ===
Klimov co-wrote the screenplay with Ales Adamovich, who fought with the Belarusian partisans as a teenager. According to the director's recollections, work on the film began in 1977:

The 40th anniversary of the Great Victory was approaching. The management had to be given something topical. I had been reading and rereading the book I Am from the Fiery Village, which consisted of the first-hand accounts of people who miraculously survived the horrors of the fascist genocide in Belorussia. Many of them were still alive then, and Belorussians managed to record some of their memories onto film. I will never forget the face and eyes of one peasant, and his quiet recollection about how his whole village had been herded into a church, and how just before they were about to be burned, an officer gave them the offer: "Whoever has no children can leave". And he couldn't take it, he left, and left behind his wife and little kids ... or about how another village was burned: the adults were all herded into a barn, but the children were left behind. And later, the drunk men surrounded them with sheepdogs and let the dogs tear the children to pieces.

And then I thought: the world doesn't know about Khatyn! They know about Katyn, about the massacre of the Polish officers there. But they don't know about Belorussia. Even though more than 600 villages were burned there!

And I decided to make a film about this tragedy. I perfectly understood that the film would end up a harsh one. I decided that the central role of the village lad Flyora would not be played by a professional actor, who upon immersion into a difficult role could have protected himself psychologically with his accumulated acting experience, technique and skill. I wanted to find a simple boy fourteen years of age. We had to prepare him for the most difficult experiences, then capture them on film. And at the same time, we had to protect him from the stresses so that he wasn't left in the loony bin after filming was over, but was returned to his mother alive and healthy. Fortunately, with Aleksei Kravchenko, who played Flyora and who later became a good actor, everything went smoothly.

The events with the people, the peasants, actually happened as shown in the film. [It] doesn't have any professional actors. Even the language spoken in the film is Belarusian. What was important was that all the events depicted in the film really did happen in Belarus.

I understood that this would be a very brutal film and that it was unlikely that people would be able to watch it. I told this to my screenplay co-author, the writer Ales Adamovich. But he replied: "Let them not watch it, then. This is something we must leave after us. As evidence of war, and as a plea for peace."

— Elem Klimov

The original Belarusian and Russian title of the film derives from Chapter 6 of the Book of Revelation, as an invitation to look upon the destruction caused by the Four Horsemen of the Apocalypse.

To prepare the 14-year-old Kravchenko for the role, Klimov called a hypnotist with autogenic training. "[Kravchenko's acting] could have had a very sad ending. He could have landed in an insane asylum," Klimov said. "I realized I had to inject him with content which he did not possess," "This is an age when a boy does not know what true hatred is, what true love is." "In the end, Mr. Kravchenko was able to concentrate so intensely that it seemed as if he had hypnotized himself for the role."

=== Filming ===
For eight years, filming could not begin because the State Committee for Cinematography (Goskino) would not accept the screenplay, considering it too realistic, calling it propaganda for the "aesthetics of dirtiness" and "naturalism". Alongside this, the death of Klimov's wife Larisa Shepitko, also a filmmaker, in 1979 forced him to first complete the work she began on what was to be her next film, Farewell; it would finally be released in 1983. Eventually in 1984, Klimov was able to start filming without having compromised to any censorship at all. The only change became the name of the film itself, to Come and See from the original, Kill Hitler (Klimov also says this in the 2006 UK DVD release).

The film was shot in chronological order over nine months. Kravchenko said that he underwent "the most debilitating fatigue and hunger. I kept a most severe diet, and after the filming was over I returned to school not only thin, but grey-haired." Contrary to what some rumors suggest, though, Kravchenko's hair did not turn permanently grey. In fact, a special silver Interferenz greasepaint, alongside a thin layer of actual silver, was used to dye his hair. This made it difficult to get it back to normal, so Kravchenko had to live with his hair like this for some time after shooting the film.

To create the maximum sense of immediacy, realism, hyperrealism, and surrealism operating in equal measure, Klimov and his cameraman Aleksei Rodionov employed naturalistic colors and lots of Steadicam shots; the film is full of extreme close-ups of faces, does not flinch from the unpleasant details of burnt flesh and bloodied corpses, and the guns were often loaded with live ammunition as opposed to blanks. Kravchenko mentioned in interviews that bullets sometimes passed just 4 inches (10 centimeters) above his head (such as in the cow scene). Very little protection was provided on the set. When the dive bombs were detonated the camera crew only had a concrete slab 1.5 meters tall and 5 meters wide (4 ft 11 in × 16 ft 5 in) to protect them. At the same time the mise-en-scène is fragmentary and disjointed: there are discontinuities between shots as characters appear in close up and then disappear off camera. Elsewhere, the moment of revelation is marked by a disorienting zoom-in/dolly-out shot.

=== Music ===
The original soundtrack is rhythmically amorphous music composed by Oleg Yanchenko. At a few key points in the film, classical music from mainly German or Austrian composers are used, such as The Blue Danube by Johann Strauss II. The Soviet marching song "The Sacred War" and Russian folk song "Korobeiniki" (Vadim Kozin) (lit. '"Pedlars"') are played in the movie once. During the scene where Glasha dances, the background music is some fragments of Mary Dixon's song from Grigori Aleksandrov's 1936 film Circus. Richard Wagner's overture to Tannhäuser and, notably, Ride of the Valkyries from Die Walküre are both used during the climactic reverse montage of historical footage.

At the end of the film, the partisans pass through a forest, while in the meantime a season passes and snow blankets the ground, to the sound of Mozart's Lacrimosa before the camera tilts towards the sky and the ending credits appear. Film critic Roger Ebert commented on this scene as follows:

There's a curious scene here in a wood, the sun falling down through the leaves, when the soundtrack, which has been grim and mournful, suddenly breaks free into Mozart. And what does this signify? A fantasy, I believe, and not Florya's [sic], who has probably never heard such music. The Mozart descends into the film like a deus ex machina, to lift us from its despair. We can accept it if we want, but it changes nothing. It is like an ironic taunt.

== Release ==
Come and See had its world premiere in the competition program at the 14th Moscow International Film Festival on 9 July 1985. It was theatrically released on 17 October 1985, drawing 28.9 million viewers and ranking sixth at the box office of 1986. It grossed $71,909 in the United States and Canada, and $20.9 million in other territories, for a worldwide total of nearly $21 million, plus $1.3 million with home video sales.

=== 2017 restoration ===
In 2017, the film received an official restoration overseen by Karen Shakhnazarov. It won the Venice Classics Award for Best Restored Film, and was also shown in several European independent cinemas again.

=== Home media ===
In Q3 2001, the film saw its initial DVD release by Russian company RusCiCo, with the film being split across two discs, featuring a new 5.1 remix (albeit omitting the original mono mix), optional voice-overs in English and Arabic, and subtitles in 13 languages. The contents of the release were licensed to various international distributors, including, but not limited to Kino International in the United States, Nouveaux Pictures in the United Kingdom, Njutafilms in Sweden,, IVC in Japan and Spectrum in South Korea.

The film became available on FilmStruck, the streaming service for the Criterion Collection from its launch on 1 November 2016 to its closure on 29 November 2018, and on the new Criterion Channel service from November 2019. On 18 December 2019, Janus Films released a trailer for a 2K restoration that premiered at the Film Forum in New York City on 21 February 2020, followed by a theatrical run, and then a home media release through Criterion on 30 June 2020.

== Reception ==
Initial reception was positive. Walter Goodman wrote for The New York Times that "The history is harrowing and the presentation is graphic ... Powerful material, powerfully rendered ...", and dismissed the ending as "a dose of instant inspirationalism," but conceded to Klimov's "unquestionable talent." Rita Kempley, of The Washington Post, wrote that "directing with an angry eloquence, [Klimov] taps into that hallucinatory nether world of blood and mud and escalating madness that Francis Ford Coppola found in Apocalypse Now. And though he draws a surprisingly vivid performance from his inexperienced teen lead, Klimov's prowess is his visual poetry, muscular and animistic, like compatriot Andrei Konchalovsky's in his epic Siberiade." Mark Le Fanu wrote in Sight & Sound that Come and See is a "powerful war film ... The director has elicited an excellent performance from his central actor Kravchenko".

According to Klimov, the film was so shocking for audiences that ambulances were sometimes called in to take away particularly impressionable viewers, both in the Soviet Union and abroad.

Come and See was selected as the Soviet entry for the Best Foreign Language Film at the 58th Academy Awards, but was not accepted as a nominee.

Award	Date of ceremony	Category	Recipient(s)	Result	Ref(s)
14th Moscow International Film Festival	12 July 1985	Golden Prize	Elem Klimov	Won	
14th Moscow International Film Festival	12 July 1985	FIPRESCI prize	Elem Klimov	Won	
74th Venice International Film Festival	9 September 2017	Venice Classics Award for Best Restored Film		Won	

== Legacy ==
=== Modern reviews ===
The film has since been widely praised in later decades. On review aggregator Rotten Tomatoes, the film holds an approval rating of 90%, based on 60 reviews, with an average rating of 9.2/10.

In 2001, Daneet Steffens of Entertainment Weekly wrote that "Klimov alternates the horrors of war with occasional fairy tale-like images; together they imbue the film with an unapologetically disturbing quality that persists long after the credits roll."

In 2001, J. Hoberman of The Village Voice reviewed Come and See, writing:

Directed for baroque intensity, Come and See is a robust art film with aspirations to the visionary – not so much graphic as leisurely literal-minded in its representation of mass murder. (The movie has been compared both to Schindler's List and Saving Private Ryan, and it would not be surprising to learn that Steven Spielberg had screened it before making either of these.) The film's central atrocity is a barbaric circus of blaring music and barking dogs in which a squadron of drunken German soldiers round up and parade the peasants to their fiery doom ... The bit of actual death-camp corpse footage that Klimov uses is doubly disturbing in that it retrospectively diminishes the care with which he orchestrates the town's destruction. For the most part, he prefers to show the Gorgon as reflected in Perseus's shield. There are few images more indelible than the sight of young Aleksei Kravchenko's fear-petrified expression.

In the same publication in 2009, Elliott Stein described Come and See as "a startling mixture of lyrical poeticism and expressionist nightmare."

In 2002, Scott Tobias of The A.V. Club wrote that Klimov's "impressions are unforgettable: the screaming cacophony of a bombing run broken up by the faint sound of a Mozart fugue, a dark, arid field suddenly lit up by eerily beautiful orange flares, German troops appearing like ghosts out of the heavy morning fog. A product of the glasnost era, Come and See is far from a patriotic memorial of Russia's hard-won victory. Instead, it's a chilling reminder of that victory's terrible costs." British magazine The Word wrote that "Come and See is widely regarded as the finest war film ever made, though possibly not by Great Escape fans." Tim Lott wrote in 2009 that the film "makes Apocalypse Now look lightweight".

In 2006, Geoffrey Macnab of Sight & Sound wrote: "Klimov's astonishing war movie combines intense lyricism with the kind of violent bloodletting that would make even Sam Peckinpah pause".

On 16 June 2010, Roger Ebert posted a review of Come and See as part of his "Great Movies" series, describing it as

one of the most devastating films ever about anything, and in it, the survivors must envy the dead ... The film depicts brutality and is occasionally very realistic, but there's an overlay of muted nightmarish exaggeration ... I must not describe the famous sequence at the end. It must unfold as a surprise for you. It pretends to roll back history. You will see how. It is unutterably depressing, because history can never undo itself, and is with us forever.

=== Modern retrospectives ===
In 2008, Come and See was placed at number 60 on Empire magazine's "The 500 Greatest Movies of All Time". It also made Channel 4's list of 50 Films to See Before You Die and was ranked number 24 in Empire magazine's "The 100 Best Films Of World Cinema" in 2010. Phil de Semlyen of Empire has described the work as "Elim [sic] Klimov's seriously influential, deeply unsettling Belarusian opus. No film – not Apocalypse Now, not Full Metal Jacket – spells out the dehumanizing impact of conflict more vividly, or ferociously ... An impressionist masterpiece and possibly the worst date movie ever." It ranked 154 among critics, and 30 among directors, in the 2012 Sight & Sound polls of the greatest films ever made, while it ranked 104 among critics, and 41 among directors, in the 2022 Sight & Sound polls. The film is generally considered one of the greatest anti-war movies ever made, and one with the most historically accurate depictions of the crimes on the Eastern Front.

Klimov did not make any more films after Come and See. In 2001, Klimov said, "I lost interest in making films ... Everything that was possible I felt I had already done."

== See also ==
- List of Soviet submissions for the Academy Award for Best Foreign Language Film
