= Welcome, or No Trespassing =

- Directed by: Elem Klimov
- Written by: Semyon Lungin; Ilya Nusinov
- Starring: Yevgeniy Yevstigneyev; Arina Aleinikova; Ilya Rutberg; Lidiya Smirnova; Aleksei Smirnov; Nina Shatskaya; Viktor Kosykh
- Cinematography: Anatoli Kuznetsov
- Edited by: Aleksandra Kamagorova
- Music by: Mikael Tariverdiev; Igor Yakushenko
- Production company: Mosfilm
- Release date: October 24, 1964
- Running time: 74 minutes
- Country: Soviet Union
- Language: Russian

Welcome, or No Trespassing (Russian: Добро пожаловать, или Посторонним вход воспрещён, romanized: Dobro pozhalovat, ili Postoronnim vkhod vospreshchyon) is a 1964 Soviet comedy film directed by Elem Klimov. It was capitalizing on the formal restrictions that children face during their vacation in a Young Pioneer camp. Most of the cast are children, while the antagonist is the director Dynin, played by Yevgeniy Yevstigneyev. The film was selected to be screened in the Cannes Classics section of the 2015 Cannes Film Festival. Both Soviet censors and modern critics characterize it as a clandestine political satire, albeit for different reasons.

== Plot ==
In a Soviet Young Pioneer camp, Dynin, the administrator is afraid that the children may succumb to harmful accidents and that he will be deemed responsible. He believes that accidents happen when formal rules are violated. Hence, he believes, everything must be done strictly according to formal instructions and regulations. One boy, Kostya Inochkin, (Viktor Kosykh) breaks one of the cardinal rules by swimming out alone to an island instead of swimming in the specially designated swimming area, supervised by staff. As a result, Inochkin is expelled from camp and is sent home. Inochkin is afraid that if his grandmother, with whom he lives, discovers that he has been expelled, she will die from sorrow, so instead of going home he returns to camp illegally. He hides but is discovered by some of the other children, who start helping him to stay, outsmarting the adults. Adults are added to the plot later and also oppose Dynin's strict regime. Finally Dynin is removed from office and expelled to the town. The film's final scenes show the joy of freedom without Dynin's restrictions, kids and adults swim and even unrealistically jump over the river (although this is presumably a fantasy).

== Cast ==
- Viktor Kosykh as Kostya Inochkin
- Yevgeniy Yevstigneyev as Comrade Dynin, head of Pioneer Camp
- Arina Aleynikova as pioneer leader Valia
- Ilya Rutberg as gym teacher
- Lidiya Smirnova as doctor
- Aleksei Smirnov as steward pioneer of Pioneer Camp

== History ==
The movie released to screen soon after dismissal of Nikita Khrushchev as a party leader. According to some sources this allowed the film to be screened. Others say that the leader himself allowed the movie. 13.4 million viewers saw it in the USSR, and the movie received a positive critical acclaim. In UK the movie had the title No Holiday for Inochkin.

== Reception ==
Initially Soviet censors barred the production of the film, seeing in some episodes mockery of Nikita Khrushchev, but allegedly Khrushchev himself permitted the film.

In a 2006 review for Slant magazine, Keith Uhlich gave Welcome, or No Trespassing a score of 2 1/2 out of 4 stars, writing that the film "carries within its deceptive ingenuousness an acute, potentially revolutionary political charge" and lamenting it "bears the scars of this ambiguous time, its profound sense of aesthetic liberation often having the adverse effect of dulling its satirical blade".

Will Noah of the Criterion Current called it a "gleefully inventive summer-camp farce barbed with allegory" and in comparison to Klimov's subsequent film Adventures of a Dentist (1965), wrote: "Welcome, or No Trespassing is lighter on its feet, skipping more quickly between shots to achieve its zippy kid-comedy rhythms".

== Influences ==
Welcome, or No Trespassing is clearly influenced by the films of François Truffaut, with visual gags reminiscent of Shoot the Piano Player (especially the Grandmother dying of grief scene) and the school shenanigans of The 400 Blows. The school motif and tone also borrows heavily from Jean Vigo's Zero for Conduct, among others. In turn, Welcome, or No Trespassing has inspired other movies, such as Billy Liar and If..., and served as a major source of inspiration for American director Wes Anderson, specifically its “camera work, storytelling devices, and charming whimsy.”
