= Adventures of a Dentist =

1965 Soviet dark comedy film directed by Elem Klimov

- Film poster
- Directed by: Elem Klimov
- Written by: Aleksandr Volodin (play & screenplay)
- Starring: Andrey Myagkov; Vera Vasilyeva; Alisa Freindlich; Panteleymon Krymov; Andrei Petrov
- Cinematography: Samuil Rubashkin
- Edited by: Valeriya Belova
- Music by: Alfred Schnittke
- Production company: Mosfilm
- Release date: 1965 (USSR)
- Running time: 82 min.
- Country: Soviet Union
- Language: Russian

Adventures of a Dentist (Russian: Похождения зубного врача, romanized: Pokhozhdyeniya zubnovo vracha) is a 1965 Soviet dark comedy film directed by Elem Klimov on Mosfilm. It is currently available to view through the Criterion Channel, and is occasionally screened at film festivals.

A dentist is derided (and nearly has his life ruined) by his jealous colleagues for his natural talent of painlessly pulling out teeth.

== Plot ==
Assigned to a small town after completing his studies, young dentist Sergey Chesnokov (played by Andrey Myagkov) discovers an extraordinary talent: the ability to extract teeth painlessly. This gift is met with mixed reactions from the community, leading to a series of emotional and life-changing events in Chesnokov's life.

Word of the talented young dentist spreads rapidly, and unlike his colleagues, Chesnokov is overwhelmed with patients. While his success earns him fame, it also provokes jealousy among his peers. Veteran dentist Rubakhin decides to leave town, while Dr. Lastochkina (Vera Vasilyeva) resorts to scheming against Chesnokov, ultimately bringing a special commission to investigate him. When Chesnokov hesitates to perform a tooth extraction on a patient, Masha, in front of the commission, he refers her to a regional clinic. Although the commission approves his decision, it inadvertently disrupts Masha’s wedding plans.

The incident causes Chesnokov to lose his unique ability to perform painless extractions. Disheartened, he abandons dentistry and takes up a teaching position. Initially regarded as a strict and meticulous instructor, Chesnokov gradually earns a reputation as a skilled educator. However, Lastochkina remains determined to discredit him and leads another commission to inspect his work at the dental technical school.

During their visit, a student suffers from a toothache, providing Chesnokov with an opportunity to prove his teaching abilities. He assigns one of his students to perform the extraction, but when the attempt fails, the commission pressures Chesnokov to intervene. Chesnokov, who no longer practices dentistry, refuses, prompting criticism about his qualifications as an instructor. Suddenly, Chesnokov feels his gift returning and successfully performs the extraction.

News of his restored talent spreads instantly, drawing a crowd to his office. When he prepares to treat another patient, one of his students requests permission to perform the extraction herself. To everyone's amazement, she successfully removes the tooth "Chesnokov-style," demonstrating that his knowledge has been passed on.

== Cast ==
- Andrey Myagkov as Sergey Petrovich Chesnokov
- Vera Vasilyeva as Lyudmila Ivanovna Lastochkina
- Alisa Freindlich as Masha
- Panteleymon Krymov as father of Masha
- Olga Gobzeva as Tanya
- Igor Kvasha as Merezhkovsky, a fighter for justice
- Valentin Nikulin as a sick man, brought for a "demonstrative" tooth extraction
- Yevgeniy Perov as Yakov Vasilyevich Rubakhin
- Andrei Petrov as Kotikov, Chesnokov's boss
- Leonid Diachkov as fiancé of Masha
- Elizaveta Nikischihina as student Zavalniuk
- Lybov Korneva as Karpova, medical student
- Svetlana Starikova as Komsomol leader

== Production ==
The film was shot in Kaluga on Dostoevsky Street, Bauman Street, Pushkin Street, Stary Torg Square, Assumption Church.

== Background ==
The film's implication, that society inevitably ostracizes those who are gifted, horrified censors who told Klimov to change it. When Klimov refused, the film was given the lowest classification: "category three", which meant that it was shown in only 25-78 movie theatres. Only about half a million viewers saw the film when it premiered. In the West, the film has gained recognition due to it being directed by Klimov (most known for his film Come and See), and it has been screened at several film festivals in the last few years.
