= Siberia, Siberia =

1991 non-fiction book by Valentin Rasputin

- Cover of the 1991 edition
- Author: Valentin Rasputin
- Translator: Margaret Winchell and Gerald Mikkelson
- Language: Russian, English
- Publisher: Molodaya Gvardiya, Northwestern University Press
- Publication date: 1991 (Russia), 1997 (U.S.),
- Publication place: Russia, United States
- Media type: Print
- Pages: 438
- ISBN: 978-0-8101-1575-0

Siberia, Siberia (Russian: Сибирь, Сибирь...) is a non-fiction book by the Russian writer Valentin Rasputin. It was originally published in Russian in 1991 by Molodaya Gvardiya (Young Guard). The second and third editions appeared in 2000 and 2006; an English translation is available as well.

Rasputin is a Russian novelist based in Irkutsk in Eastern Siberia, and a master of the genre known as village prose. His fiction centers around the conflict of the traditional Siberian village lifestyle, characterized by its family values, unambiguous morality, and strong connection with one's ancestral culture and natural environment, with the modernizing developments of the post-World War II period. Since the mid-1970s, he has been increasingly involved in writing non-fiction essays and article, protesting against projects he views as environmentally destructive and advocating for the restoration of "Russian national consciousness".

His Siberia, Siberia is both an excursion into the human history of the region, and a diatribe against the industrial developments and infrastructure projects "of the last three decades" (i.e. roughly 1960–1990) that he views as wrecking not only the region's natural environments and the rural way of life, but also the very moral fibre of the nation.

== Book summary ==
Besides an introductory overview chapters and the conclusion, the book consists of several chapters which are dedicated to particular regions: Tobolsk, the old capital of Russian Siberia; Lake Baikal; Irkutsk, the city on the Angara which the author has long made his made home; Altai; Kyakhta, the 18–19th century entrepôt for China tea trade; and the isolated Arctic community of Russkoye Ustye with its archaic customs and dialect. Later Russian editions had additional chapters added.

As usual in Rasputin's writing, his greatest ire is reserved for the masterminds of the river damming and water export schemes, such as the Siberian river reversal project, which was shelved (not without Rasputin's contribution to its criticism) in 1986.

[W]herever dams are put up and reservoirs swell, a river ceases to be a river and becomes a disfigured beast of burden with the life squeezed out of it. After that, the river contain no fish, no life, no beauty.

== Translations into foreign languages ==
An English translation by Margaret Winchell and Gerald Mikkelson was published by Northwestern University Press in 1996.

== Awards ==
The third Russian edition of the book, which appeared in 2006, earned the 2007 Book of the Year Award of the Moscow Book Fair in the "Literary Russian Language" ("Русский литературный") category.

== Criticism ==
Some Western critics claim that while Rasputin is vocal in defending the Siberia's long-established Russian community against Moscow's central planners and the carpetbaggers brought to the region by the development projects, he disregards the plight of the region's aboriginal people and their intrinsic property rights in the region's natural resources.
