= Agony (1981 film) =

1981 Soviet film

- Theatrical release poster
- Directed by: Elem Klimov
- Written by: Semyon Lungin; Ilya Nusinov
- Produced by: Elem Klimov
- Starring: Aleksei Petrenko
- Cinematography: Leonid Kalashnikov
- Edited by: Valeria Belova
- Music by: Alfred Schnittke
- Production company: Mosfilm
- Distributed by: Mosfilm
- Release dates: 21 July 1981 (Moscow); September 1982 (Venice); 19 February 1983 (Berlin); June 1985 (Soviet Union)
- Running time: see below
- Country: Soviet Union
- Language: Russian

Agony (Russian: Агония, romanized: Agoniya; U.S. theatrical/DVD title Rasputin) is a 1981 Soviet biographical film by Elem Klimov, made c.1973-75 and released in Western and Central Europe in 1982 (United States and Soviet Union 1985), after protracted resistance from Soviet authorities. The film is notable for its rich, sometimes baroque style, its sumptuous recreation of episodes from the final year of Imperial Russia and the psychological portraits of Grigori Rasputin and the Imperial family.

== Plot ==
The storyline follows the final months of 1916 up to the murder of Rasputin; some events have been telescoped into this time though they actually happened earlier, during World War I. Rasputin's effect on people around him is shown as almost hypnotic, and the film avoids taking a moral stance towards him—breaking not only with Soviet history but also with how he was regarded by people near the court at the time, some of whom regarded him as a debilitating figure who disgraced the monarchy and hampered the war effort, leading to the mounting defeats of the Imperial Russian Army.

== Cast ==
- Aleksei Petrenko as Grigori Rasputin
- Anatoli Romashin as emperor Nicholas II
- Velta Līne as empress Alexandra Feodorovna
- Alisa Freindlich as Anna Vyrubova
- Aleksandr Romantsov as Felix Yusupov
- Yuri Katin-Yartsev as Vladimir Purishkevich
- Leonid Bronevoy as Ivan Manasevich-Manuilov
- Pavel Pankov as Manus
- Mickhail Danilov as Mikhail M. Andronikov
- Mikhail Svetin as Terekhov
- Boris Romanov as Balashov
- Lyudmila Polyakova as Praskovya Fyodorovna, Rasputin's wife
- Afanasi Trishkin as Maklakov
- Valentina Talyzina as Akilina

== Release ==
The film went unshown until 1981, when it was screened at the Moscow Film Festival and attracted very favourable reviews. Released in Western Europe, Czechoslovakia, Hungary, Poland in 1982, it was hailed as one of the most original Soviet films of the 1970s. It was screened later in 1985, at the dawn of the Glasnost era.

The versions released in the 1980s, and later on DVD, differ somewhat in length and the final voice-over newsreel shots of the 1917 revolution may have been added in to appease authorities. The original mid-1970s cut does not seem to have survived, and it is unclear how much was rewritten or possibly reshot after 1975.

=== Alternate versions ===
At least four versions of the film exist, their length ranging from 73 minutes, 104 minutes, 142 minutes (the North American DVD release from Kino International) and 151 minutes (the 1982 international release).
