= Sport, Sport, Sport =

- Russian: Спорт, спорт, спорт
- Directed by: Elem Klimov
- Written by: German Klimov; Bella Akhmadulina
- Starring: Georgiy Svetlani; Larisa Shepitko; Nikita Mikhalkov; Valeri Brumel; Boris Romanov
- Narrated by: Zinoviy Gerdt
- Cinematography: Boris Brozhovsky; Yuri Skhirtladze; Oleg Zguridi
- Edited by: Valeriya Belova; G. Ginzburg
- Music by: Alfred Schnittke
- Production company: Mosfilm
- Release date: 1970
- Running time: 85 minutes
- Country: Soviet Union
- Language: Russian

Sport, Sport, Sport (Russian: Спорт, спорт, спорт) is a 1970 Soviet sports film directed by Elem Klimov.

The film combines staged scenes, documentary episodes about Soviet and foreign athletes, and newsreels.

The film tells the history of the development of sports, showing the stadiums of Moscow, Philadelphia, Stockholm and Mexico City in the past and future.

== Plot ==
The film opens with the following subtitle: "Several stories take place in the stadium arena, in the stands, and beneath the bleachers.

Real athletes, coaches, and fans will introduce you to the everyday life of sports and its legends.

We advise you to approach the tales of the old masseur with caution."

The action unfolds across stadiums in Moscow, Philadelphia, Stockholm, and Mexico City, as well as in imagined arenas of the future and distant past. Combining documentary footage of real sporting events with narrative vignettes presented through pantomime and ballet, the filmmakers explore the evolution of sports and its intersection with politics, art, and ethics.

The central narrative revolves around the anecdotes of Uncle Volodya, an old masseur, who shares his tales with young athletes training at a sports complex. According to him, he once trained the famous pre-World War I runner Jean Bouin. At a championship in London, he reportedly helped a Soviet heavyweight boxer lose 13 kilograms to qualify in the light heavyweight category. To uplift a young boxer who has just lost a match, Uncle Volodya recounts the legendary duel between merchant Kalashnikov and Kiribeevich from Russian folklore. He also speculates about the future of sports, envisioning a time when sports will be inseparably tied to art, with no winners or losers, and where massage will take center stage.

Uncle Volodya’s stories are interspersed with archival footage and episodes from sports history, including:

- Jesse Owens winning four gold medals at the 1936 Berlin Olympics, infuriating Adolf Hitler.
- American runner Bob Soth narrowly surviving dehydration during a grueling 10,000-meter race in extreme heat at the 1959 USA-USSR athletics meet.
- Soviet high jumper and world record-holder Valery Brumel’s inspiring recovery and return to competition following a severe accident.

== Cast ==
- Zinoviy Gerdt as narrator (voice)
- Georgiy Svetlani as uncle Volodya (voiced by Rolan Bykov)
- Larisa Shepitko as queen
- Nikita Mikhalkov as Kiribeevich
- Leonid Tarnovsky as accordionist
- Yevgeny Moskalyov as swimmer
- Igor Klass as Ivan the Terrible
- Boris Romanov as merchant Kalashnikov
- Valeri Brumel as cameo
- Yevgeny Matveev as cameo
- Bella Akhmadulina as cameo
- Daniel Olbrychski as cameo
- Vadim Sinyavsky as cameo
- Vladimir Andreev as cameo
