= Bratsk =

City in Irkutsk Oblast, Russia

Bratsk Братск
- City
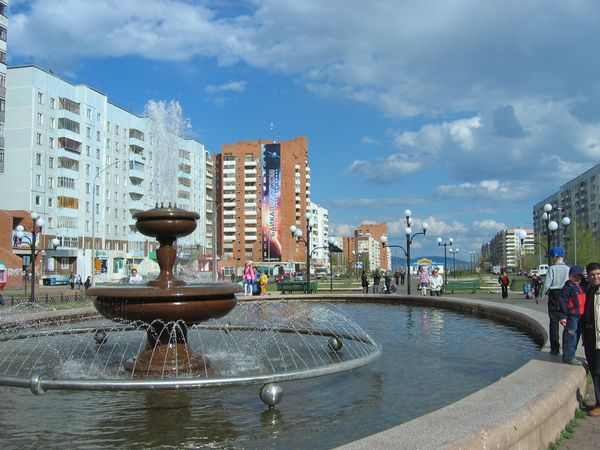
- Fountain on Sovetskaya Street in Bratsk

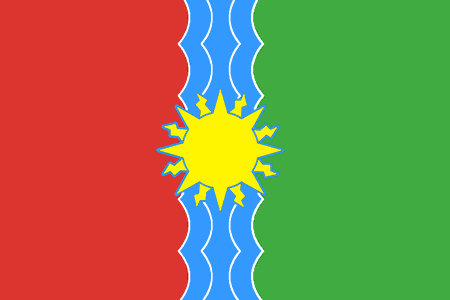
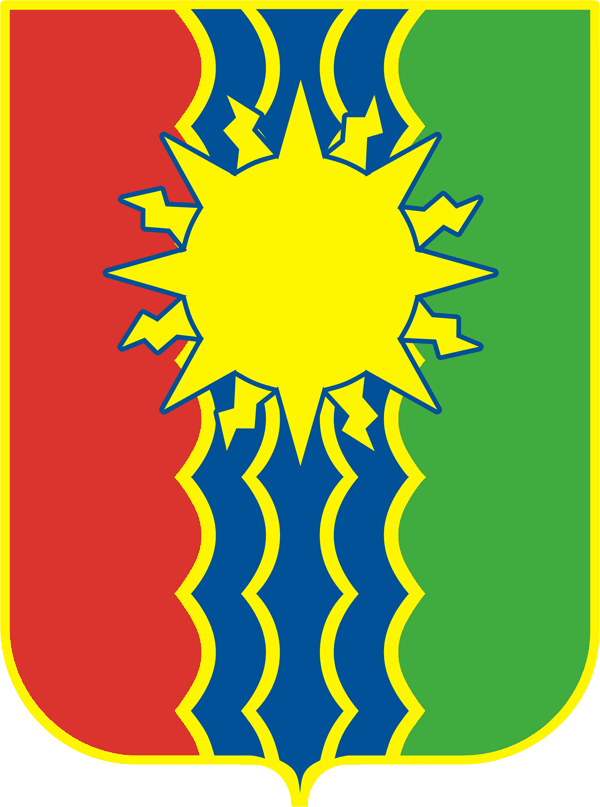
- Flag Coat of arms
- Interactive map of Bratsk
- Location of Bratsk Bratsk (Irkutsk Oblast)
- Coordinates: 56°07′N 101°36′E
- Country: Russia
- Federal subject: Irkutsk Oblast
- Founded: 1631
- City status since: 1955

Government
  - Body: Duma
  - Head: Alexander Dubrovin

Area
  - Total: 263 km^{2} (102 sq mi)
- Elevation: 450 m (1,480 ft)

Population (2010 Census)
  - Total: 246,319
  - Estimate (2025): 219,365 (−10.9%)
  - Rank: 75th in 2010
  - Density: 937/km^{2} (2,430/sq mi)

Administrative status
  - Subordinated to: City of Bratsk
  - Capital of: Bratsky District, City of Bratsk

Municipal status
  - Urban okrug: Bratsk Urban Okrug
  - Capital of: Bratsk Urban Okrug, Bratsky Municipal District
- Time zone: UTC+8 (MSK+5)
- Postal code: 665700–665732
- Dialing code: +7 3953
- OKTMO ID: 25714000001
- Website: www.bratsk-city.ru

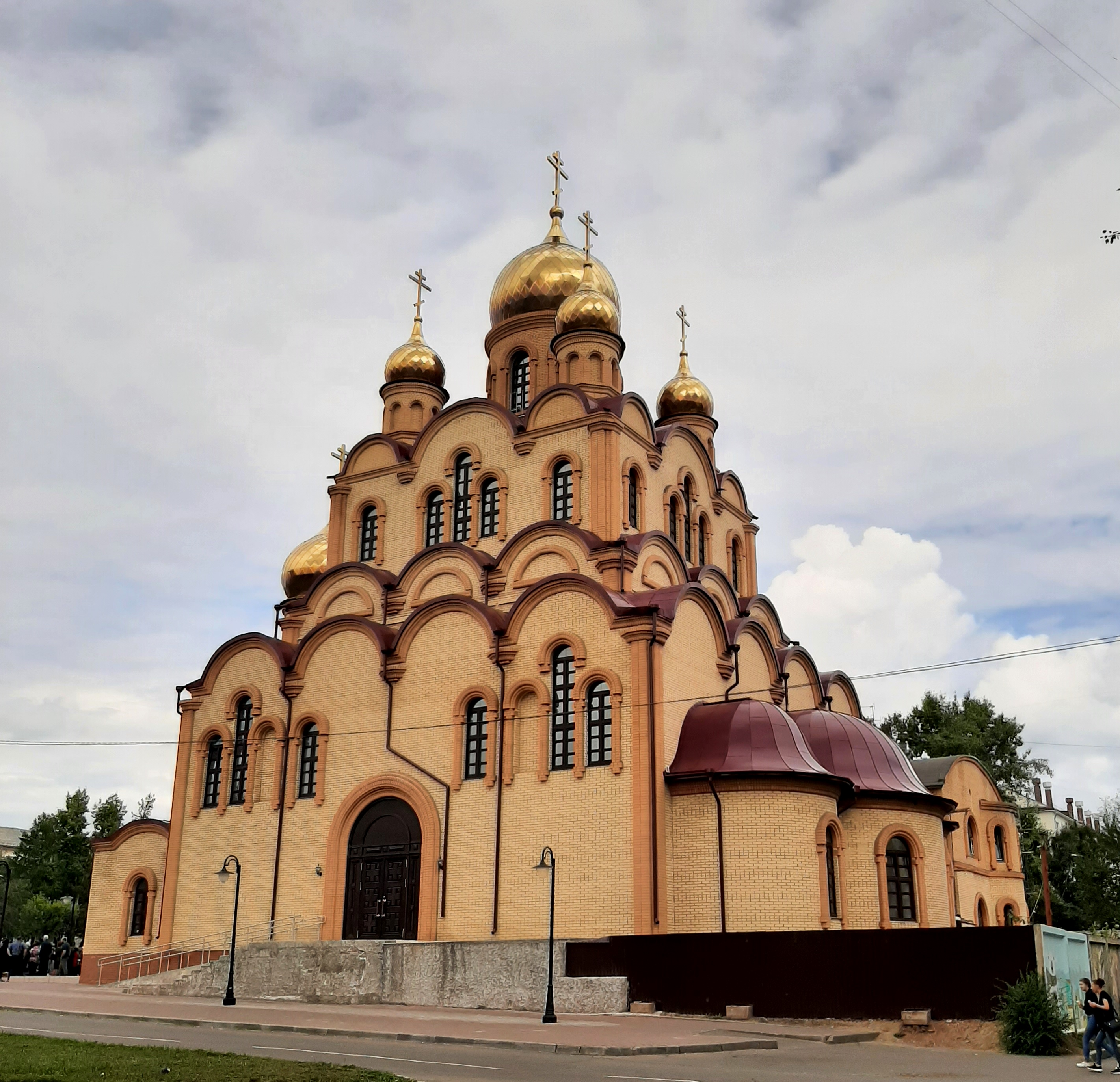
Church of the Nativity

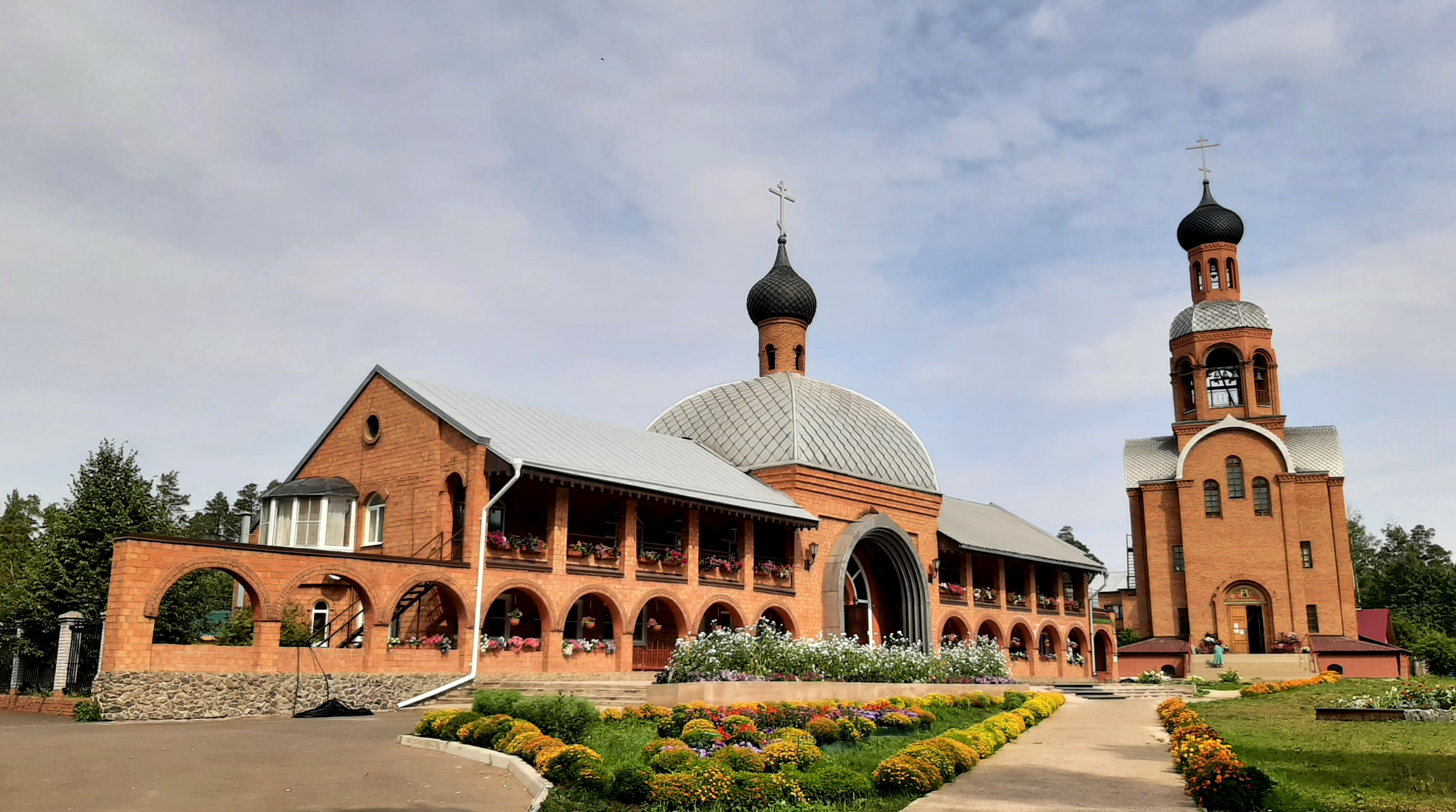
Church of All Saints Resplendent in the Russian Land

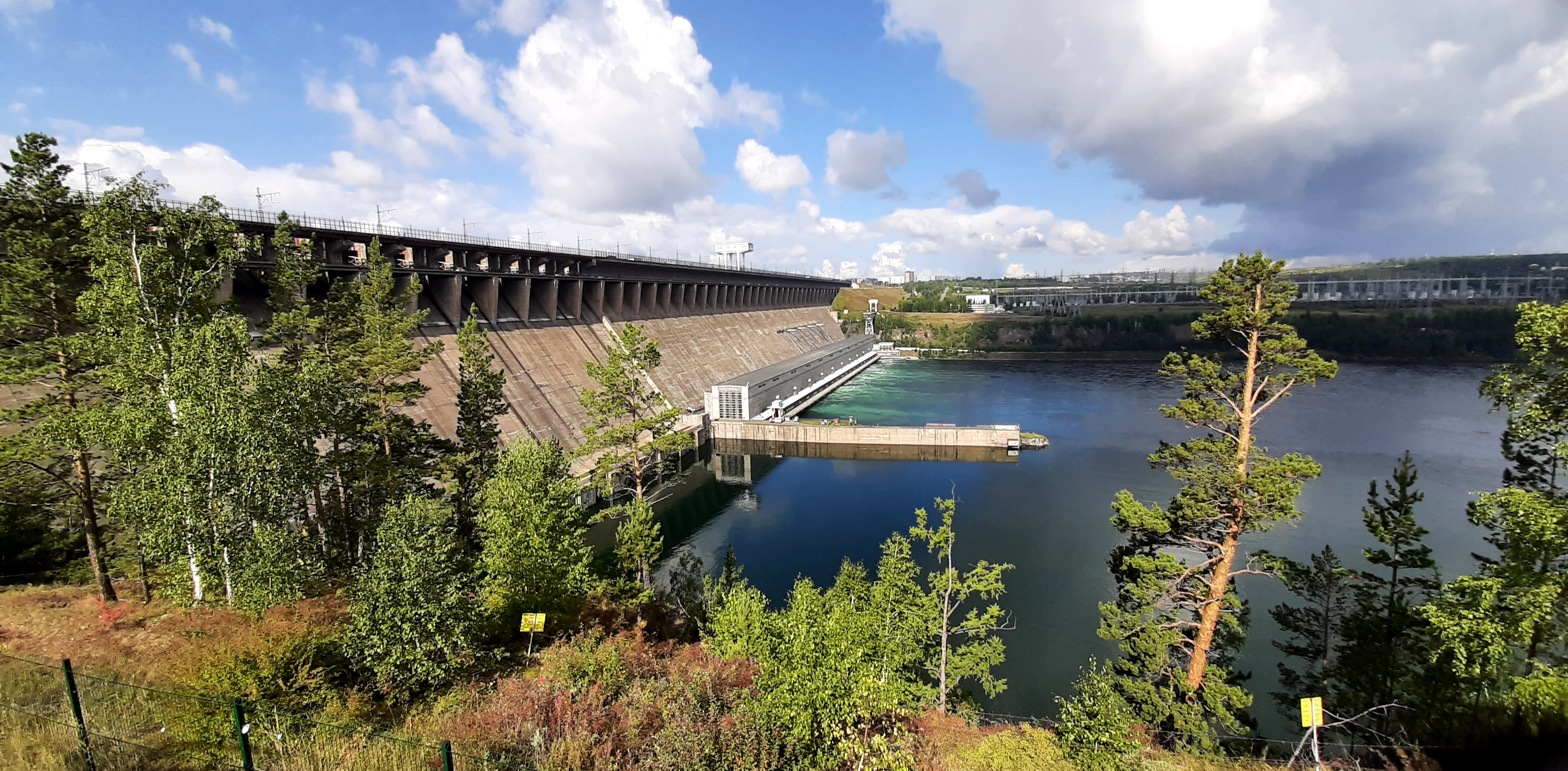
Bratsk HPS

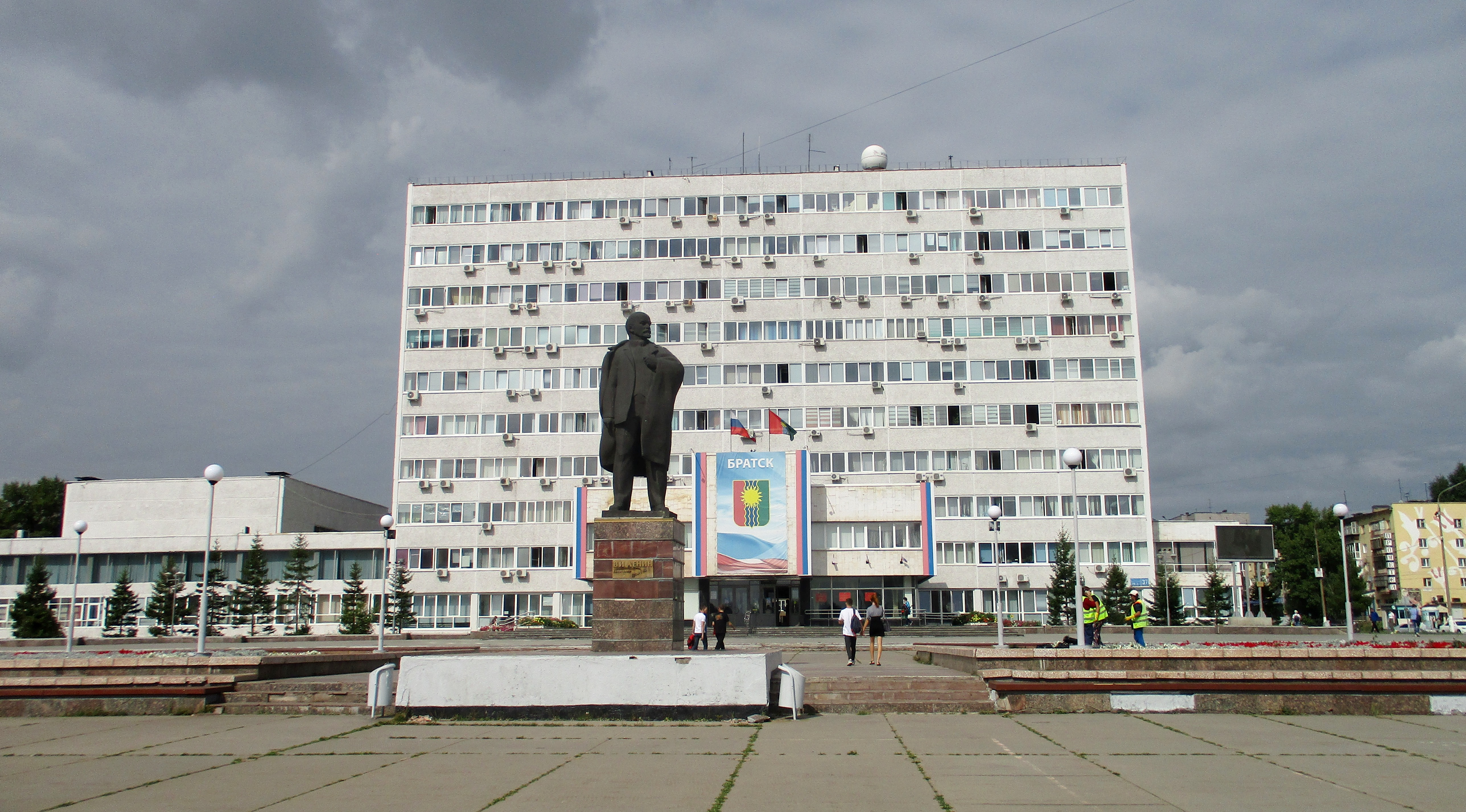
Bratsk City Hall

Bratsk (UK: /ˈbrætsk/, UK: /ˈbrɑːtsk/; Russian: Братск [ˈbratsk]) is a city in Irkutsk Oblast, Russia, located on the Angara River near the vast Bratsk Reservoir. It had population of 224,071 (2021 census).

== Etymology ==
The name of the city, which is from the same root as the Russian word for 'brother' (брат / brat), derives from the Russian phrase for 'brotherly people' (братские люди / bratskije ljudi) (Buryats by origin).

== History ==
The first Europeans in the area arrived in 1623, intending to collect taxes from the local Buryat population. Permanent settlement began with the construction of an ostrog ('fortress') in 1631 at the junction of the Oka and Angara rivers. Several wooden towers from the 17th-century fort are now exhibited in Kolomenskoye Estate of Moscow.

During World War II, there was an increase in industrial activity in Siberia, as Soviet industry was moved to the lands east of the Ural Mountains. After the end of the war, development slowed as resources were required in the rebuilding of European Russia.

In 1947, the Gulag Angara prison labor camp was constructed near Bratsk, with capacity for up to 44,000 prisoners for projects such as the construction of the railway from Tayshet to Ust-Kut via Bratsk (now the western section of the Baikal-Amur Mainline).

The city's rapid development commenced with the announcement in 1952 that a dam and hydroelectric plant would be built at Bratsk on the Angara River. Town status was granted to Bratsk in 1955. The city of Bratsk was formed from separate villages, industrial and residential areas according to a 1958–61 masterplan. These areas were in certain cases far away from each other, leading to the large territorial area of the Bratsk municipal region, and explaining why there are unsettled areas of taiga between city districts.

The 4,500-megawatt Bratsk Hydroelectric Power Station was built between 1954 and 1966, bringing numerous workers to the town. Other industries in the city include an aluminum smelter and a pulp mill.

Bratsk originally comprised the following regions, with the idea being that they would each grow, and merge, to form the city of Bratsk.

- Green Town – named after the color of the 159 tents which were erected on the left banks of the river Angar, the Padunsky region, in 1954. The tents were originally intended to be short-term resident, but they stood for two years, before the area became built up with timber huts. Green Town eventually fell into abandonment, and in 1961 was flooded by a reservoir and ceased to exist.
- Padun – in 1956, wooden cottages began to be erected in the left bank settlement known as Pursey, then Permanent - because it was built on stable, non-flooded land, next to Green Town and the village of Padun, which were being demolished.
- Bratsk Sea – founded in 1961 and later merged into Padun. Only the train stop bearing the name 'Bratsk Sea' reminds that it was once a separate area.
- Gidrostroitel – originally called the Right Bank, construction began in 1955 and grew rapidly due to construction workers on the Bratsk hydroelectric plant being based there.
- Osinovka – originated from a peasant hut, adjoining aspen groves, and islets of fields among taiga and hayfields in the floodplain of the Angara River, which were later occupied by the settlement of Gidrostroitel. Osinovka was originally populated by residents of the village of Zayarsk and the Angarstroy administration. When the area was being connected by railway, Osinovka was classified as within the Gidrostroitel area, and thus the station was named Gidrostroitel and Osinovka was largely incorporated into that area.
- Sukhoi – founded in 1959, during the preparation of the Bratsk reservoir. For many years a geological exploration expedition was located in Sukhoy.
- Central District – initially built for workers of the timber industry complex (the Central District was called the LPK area), workers of an aluminum plant and residents of flooded settlements. Later it became the administrative center of the city.
- Chekanovsky, Porozhsky, Stroitel regions – quickly constructed to deal with the housing shortage in the other parts of the city. They were initially built of wood, in regions of dangerous ecology of the city. The location, and construction of these developments would prove to be a problem for their future development, and often led to resettling rather than development.

== Administrative and municipal status ==
Within the framework of administrative divisions, Bratsk serves as the administrative center of Bratsky District, even though it is not technically a part of it. As an administrative division, it is incorporated separately as the City of Bratsk—an administrative unit with the status equal to that of the districts. As a municipal division, the City of Bratsk is incorporated as Bratsk Urban Okrug.

=== Territorial divisions ===
For administrative purposes, the city is divided into three districts (populations are as of the 2010 Census):

- Padunsky (Падунский), 56,205 inhabitants;
- Pravoberezhny (Правобережный), 38,550 inhabitants;
- Tsentralny (Центральный), 151,564 inhabitants.

Residential districts of the city, some of which are separated by open country, include: Bikey, Chekanovsky, Energetik, Gidrostroitel, Osinovka, Padun, Porozhsky, Sosnovy, Stenikha, Sukhoy, Tsentralny, and Yuzhny Padun.

== Politics ==
The current mayor of Bratsk is Sergei Vasilievich Serebrennikov. In November 2013 the city council amended the charter to institute direct mayoral elections, which had been abolished in 2011. Elected again in 2014, Serebrennikov then began his second term after previously having served as mayor between 2005 and 2009.

== Culture ==
=== Theatres ===
- Bratsk Drama Theatre

=== Museums ===
Bratsk has multiple museums.

- Architectural and Ethnographic Museum Angarsk Village named after. O.Leonova
- Art Exhibition Hall - branch of the Bratsk City United Museum
- Museum of Light
- Museum of City History

=== In popular culture ===
The film 'Svist' was filmed in Bratsk.

== Climate ==
Bratsk has a subarctic climate (Köppen climate classification Dfc). Winters are very cold and long with average temperatures from −23 °C (−9 °F) to −15.4 °C (4.3 °F) in January, while summers are mild to warm with average temperatures from +13.7 °C (56.7 °F) to +24.3 °C (75.7 °F) in July. Precipitation is moderate and is significantly higher in summer than at other times of the year.

Climate data for Bratsk (1991–2020, extremes 1901–present)
| Month | Jan | Feb | Mar | Apr | May | Jun | Jul | Aug | Sep | Oct | Nov | Dec | Year |
|---|---|---|---|---|---|---|---|---|---|---|---|---|---|
| Record high °C (°F) | 3.8 (38.8) | 7.4 (45.3) | 14.9 (58.8) | 23.4 (74.1) | 34.2 (93.6) | 36.1 (97.0) | 35.2 (95.4) | 32.5 (90.5) | 27.5 (81.5) | 23.9 (75.0) | 11.6 (52.9) | 6.6 (43.9) | 36.1 (97.0) |
| Mean maximum °C (°F) | −3.9 (25.0) | −0.6 (30.9) | 7.9 (46.2) | 15.5 (59.9) | 24.8 (76.6) | 29.4 (84.9) | 30.6 (87.1) | 28.0 (82.4) | 21.7 (71.1) | 13.8 (56.8) | 5.2 (41.4) | −2.5 (27.5) | 30.6 (87.1) |
| Mean daily maximum °C (°F) | −15.4 (4.3) | −10.8 (12.6) | −1.8 (28.8) | 6.4 (43.5) | 14.3 (57.7) | 21.4 (70.5) | 24.3 (75.7) | 21.4 (70.5) | 13.4 (56.1) | 4.8 (40.6) | −5.6 (21.9) | −13.3 (8.1) | 4.9 (40.8) |
| Daily mean °C (°F) | −19.4 (−2.9) | −16.0 (3.2) | −7.8 (18.0) | 0.9 (33.6) | 7.8 (46.0) | 15.2 (59.4) | 18.7 (65.7) | 16.0 (60.8) | 8.5 (47.3) | 1.0 (33.8) | −9.1 (15.6) | −17.0 (1.4) | −0.1 (31.8) |
| Mean daily minimum °C (°F) | −23.0 (−9.4) | −20.7 (−5.3) | −13.2 (8.2) | −3.8 (25.2) | 2.6 (36.7) | 10.0 (50.0) | 13.7 (56.7) | 11.3 (52.3) | 4.7 (40.5) | −2.1 (28.2) | −12.3 (9.9) | −20.3 (−4.5) | −4.4 (24.1) |
| Mean minimum °C (°F) | −35.3 (−31.5) | −33.2 (−27.8) | −27.5 (−17.5) | −13.7 (7.3) | −4.8 (23.4) | 3.1 (37.6) | 7.7 (45.9) | 5.0 (41.0) | −2.2 (28.0) | −12.6 (9.3) | −26.8 (−16.2) | −32.6 (−26.7) | −35.3 (−31.5) |
| Record low °C (°F) | −57.6 (−71.7) | −49.8 (−57.6) | −44.1 (−47.4) | −35.0 (−31.0) | −14.1 (6.6) | −5.4 (22.3) | −1.4 (29.5) | −2.8 (27.0) | −8.1 (17.4) | −33.4 (−28.1) | −46.6 (−51.9) | −51.2 (−60.2) | −57.6 (−71.7) |
| Average precipitation mm (inches) | 16 (0.6) | 13 (0.5) | 12 (0.5) | 16 (0.6) | 34 (1.3) | 51 (2.0) | 61 (2.4) | 62 (2.4) | 39 (1.5) | 24 (0.9) | 26 (1.0) | 22 (0.9) | 376 (14.8) |
| Average precipitation days (≥ 1.0 mm) | 4.6 | 3.4 | 3.2 | 5.1 | 7.8 | 7.5 | 9.5 | 9.3 | 7.3 | 6.3 | 7.2 | 7.5 | 77.7 |
| Mean monthly sunshine hours | 68 | 115 | 182 | 217 | 249 | 281 | 268 | 227 | 165 | 107 | 56 | 43 | 1,978 |
Source 1: Pogoda.ru.net
Source 2: NOAA (sun and precipitation days, 1961–1990)

Historical population
| Year | Pop. | ±% |
|---|---|---|
| 1959 | 51,455 | — |
| 1970 | 155,362 | +201.9% |
| 1979 | 213,725 | +37.6% |
| 1989 | 255,705 | +19.6% |
| 2002 | 259,335 | +1.4% |
| 2010 | 246,319 | −5.0% |
| 2021 | 224,071 | −9.0% |
Source: Census data

== Economy and infrastructure ==
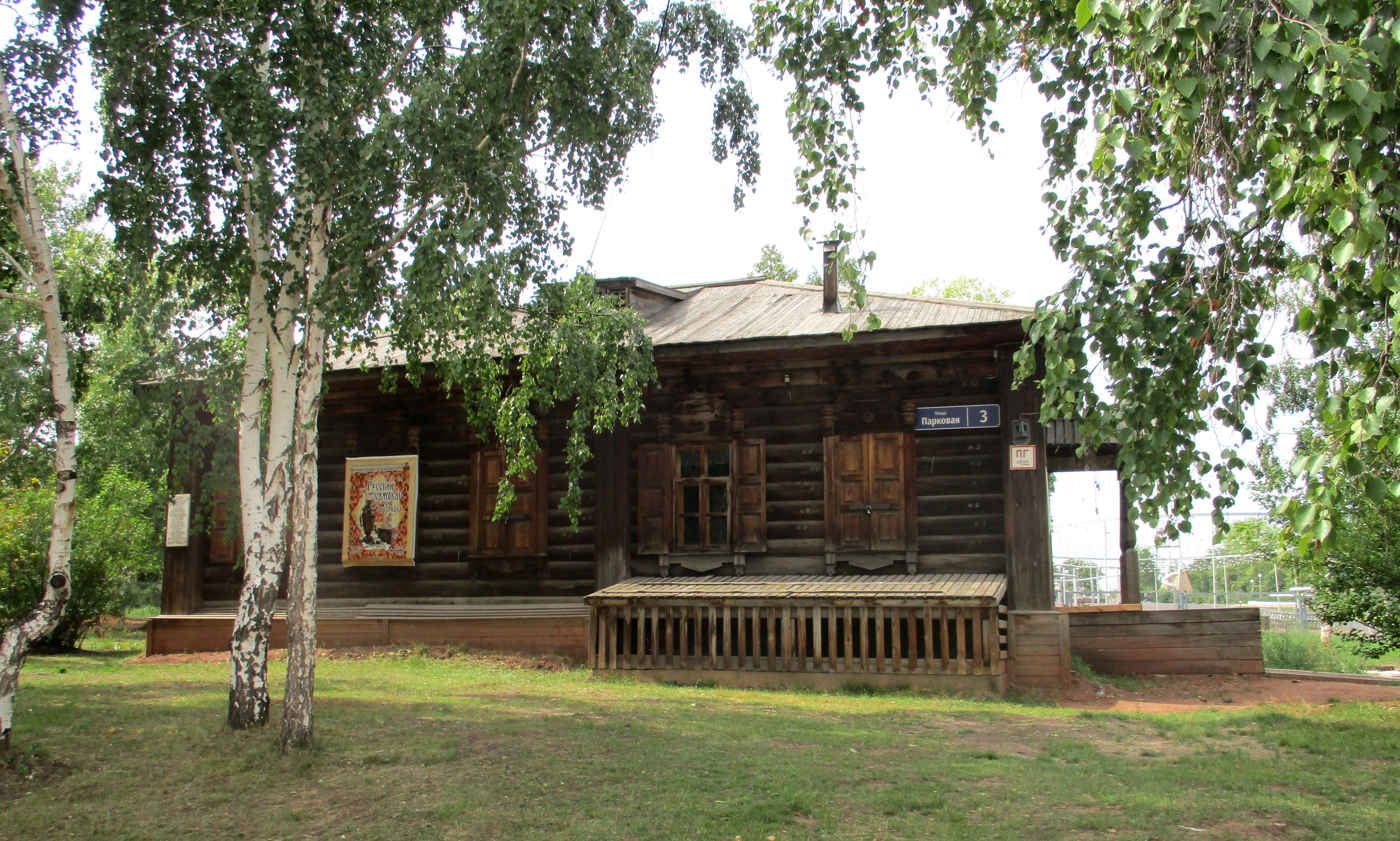
Museum of the History of Political Exile

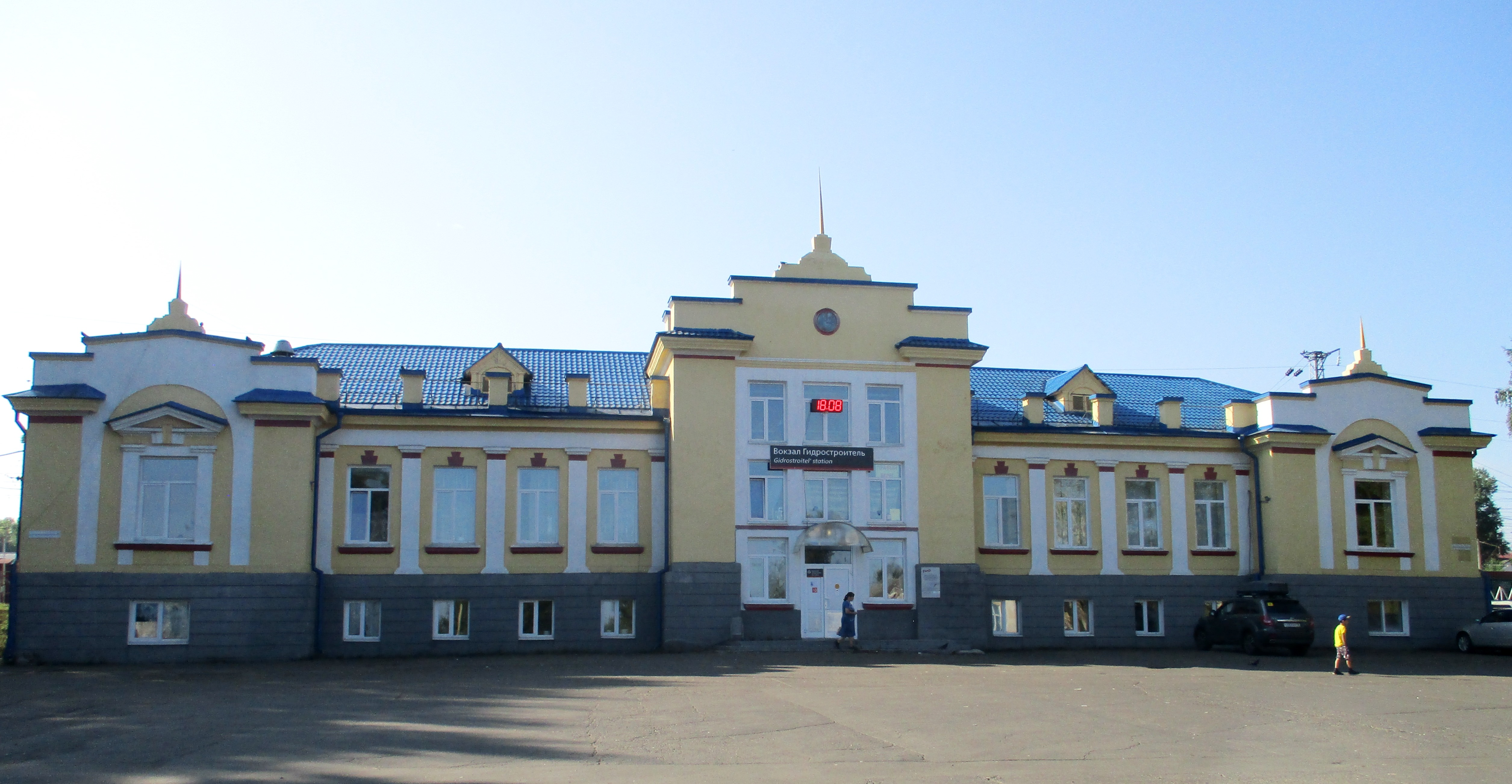
Gidrostroitel railway station

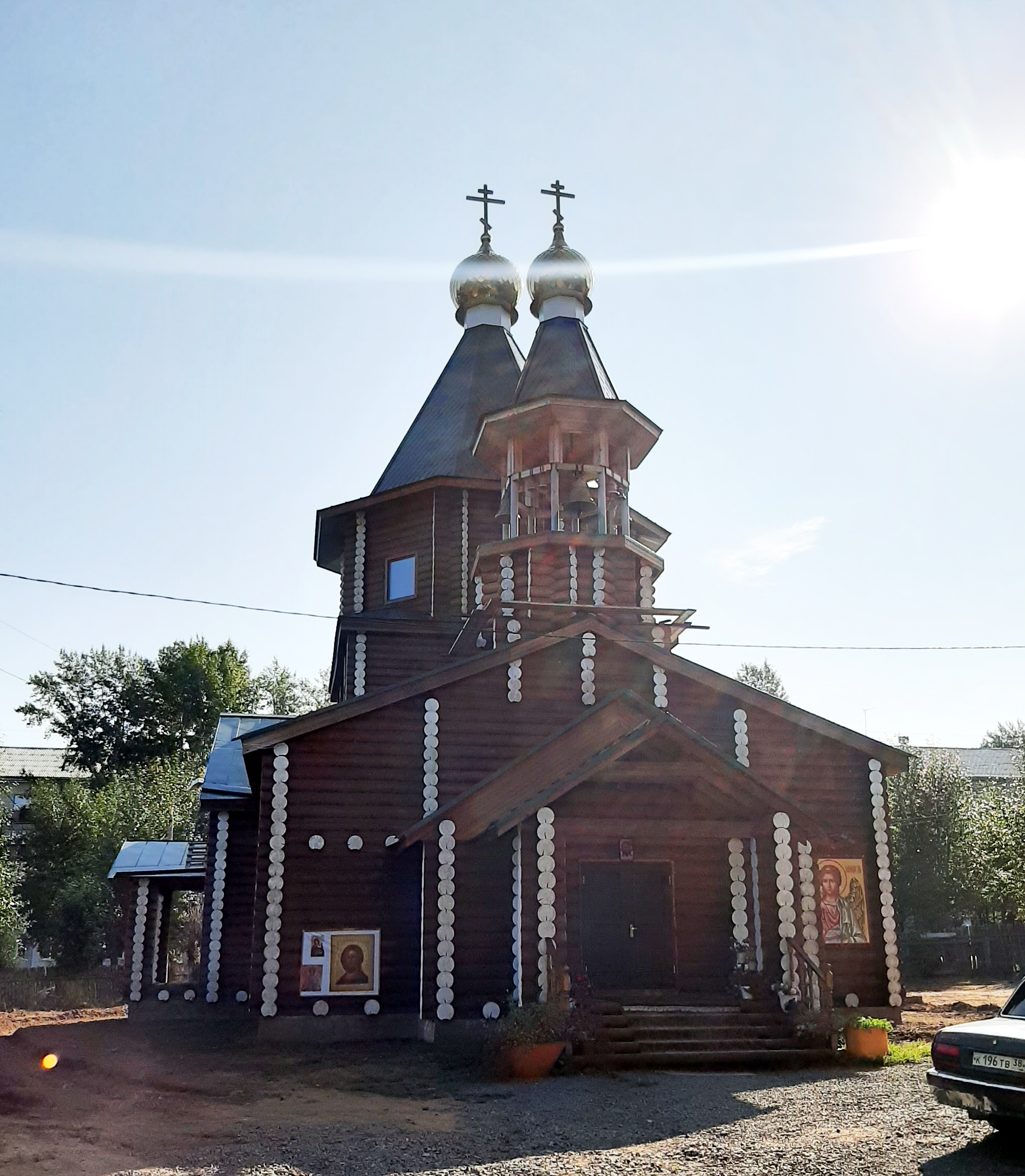
Church of St. Sergius of Radonezh

Bratsk is served by the Baikal-Amur Mainline railway and by the Bratsk Airport. There is a hydrofoil up the Angara to Irkutsk. Public transport includes buses and trolleybuses (only in the central district)

The city's economy is largely reliant on heavy industry, including one of Russia's largest aluminum plants, lumber mills, chemical works, and a coal-fired power station.

Higher educational facilities include the Bratsk State University and a branch of the Irkutsk State University.

In recent times, Bratsk has attracted attention due to association with the cryptocurrency industry.

Rusal operates a smelter in Bratsk.

== Industry ==
Bratsk Reservoir has traditionally been a major employer for the city of Bratsk. Thousands were involved in its construction, and to this day the reservoir, and dam, support many jobs in the city, both directly connected to the dam itself, and secondary industries - i.e. fishing. Bratsk Reservoir is a popular tourist attraction, and due to this, Bratsk has a small, but notable, tourism industry.

Modern Bratsk is classed as a 'high-density industrial region', producing around 20% of the industrial output of the Irkutsk oblast.

In recent times, Bratsk has attracted attention due to the reported presence of bitcoin operations in the city.

== Pollution ==
Bratsk has often attracted negative attention due to the reported pollution levels of the city. The city was among the Blacksmith Institute's "Dirty Thirty", the thirty most polluted places in the world.

Bratsk Reservoir is one of the world's largest, and has been at the centre of repeated claims about its level of pollution. According to Yuri Udodov, head of the Federal Committee on Ecology (FCE) in Irkutsk Oblast, the reservoir has "the highest rate of discharge of metallic mercury into the environment [in] all of Siberia." The extent of mercury pollution in the ground around the nearby Usolye chemical plant is equal to half the total global production of mercury in 1992.

Bratsk Reservoir is the main source of drinking water for the city of Bratsk, and surrounding area. The drinking water is drawn from the part of the reservoir categorised as 'clean'. Due to a number of factors, both man-made and natural, the quality of the water from Bratsk reservoir ranges from 'clean', down to 'dirty'.

== Twin towns and sister cities ==
Bratsk is twinned with:

- Nanao, Ishikawa Prefecture, Japan
- Zibo, Shandong, China

== Notable people ==
- Yevgeni Balyaikin (born 1988), association football player
- Roman Bugayev (born 1989), association football player
- Fedor Chudinov (born 1987), professional boxer
- Alexander Kasjanov (born 1983), bobsledder
- Vladimir Krasnov (born 1990), sprint athlete
- Jessica Long, Paralympic gold medal winner
- Marina Pankova (1963–2015), volleyball player, Olympic and world champion
- Semen Pavlichenko (born 1991), luger
- Valentina Popova (born 1972), weightlifter, world and European champion
- Alexandra Rodionova (born 1984), bobsledder and luger
- Alexandr Zubkov (born 1974), bobsledder
- Icegergert (born 2001), rapper
