= Boris Romanov (actor) =

Russian film and theater actor (born 1942)

Boris Leonidovich Romanov (Russian: Борис Леонидович Романов; born March 29, 1942, Lyubim, Yaroslavl Oblast) is a Soviet and Russian film and theater actor, People's Artist of Russia (2005).

== Biography ==
Boris Romanov born March 29, 1942, in Lyubim (Yaroslavl Oblast).

In 1959-1961 he studied at drama school at Saratov Drama Theater, there at the age of 17, he went to the professional scene. Then he entered the studio Moscow Art Theatre (Sofya Pilyavskaya and Alexander Karev course) and he graduated in 1966. In 1966–1982 years - an actor the Moscow Stanislavsky Drama Theater, in 1982–1985 years - in Taganka Theatre. Since 1990 - Hermitage Moscow theater.

== Selected filmography ==
- 1964 – I, Beryoza as a German officer
- 1969 – Bonivur's Heart as episode
- 1970 – Sport, Sport, Sport as merchant Kalashnikov
- 1973 – The Silence of Dr. Evans as Buami
- 1974 – Agony as Balashov
- 1979 – The Wild Hunt King Stach as coroner
- 1980 – Story of an Unknown Man as Gruzhin
- 1984 – Planet Parade as organic chemist
- 1989 – Crash – Cop's Daughter as Andrey Olegovich
- 1989 – Entrance to the Labyrinth as Vladimir Lyzhin
- 1991 – Humiliated and Insulted as Nikolay Ikhmenev
- 1996 – Queen Margot as Ambroise Paré
- 2006 – The First Circle as professor Chelnov
