= Farewell (1983 film) =

Soviet Union film

Farewell (Russian: Прощание, Proshchanie)
- Directed by: Larisa Shepitko; Elem Klimov
- Written by: German Klimov; Larisa Shepitko; Rudolf Tyurin
- Starring: Stefaniya Stanyuta; Lev Durov; Aleksei Petrenko; Leonid Kryuk; Vadim Yakovenko; Yuri Katin-Yartsev
- Cinematography: Vladimir Chukhnov, Aleksei Rodionov, Yuri Skhirtladze, Sergei Taraskin
- Edited by: Valeriya Belova
- Music by: Vyacheslav Artyomov, Alfred Schnittke
- Production company: Mosfilm
- Distributed by: Sovexportfilm
- Release date: 1983
- Running time: 121 minutes
- Country: Soviet Union
- Language: Russian

Farewell (Russian: Прощание, romanized: Proshchanie) is a 1983 Soviet drama film based on Valentin Rasputin's novel Farewell to Matyora and directed by Larisa Shepitko and Elem Klimov. It was Shepitko's last film. She died during filming in 1979 and her husband Elem replaced her as director.

As a remote Russian village faces submersion for a new dam project, its elderly residents grapple with leaving their ancestral home, symbolizing resilience against inevitable change.

== Plot ==
The village of Matyora, located on a small island of the same name, faces imminent flooding due to the construction of a hydroelectric dam. The villagers have long been informed of their relocation to a new settlement, but the elderly residents hold out, reluctant to leave their ancestral home. The task of overseeing the move is given to Pavel Pinigine, a longtime resident who finds the duty painful, while his supervisor, Vorontsov, sees the project as a necessary sacrifice for the greater good: the construction of a new hydroelectric dam and the towns that will develop around it.

A team arrives on the island to dismantle the village, cutting down ancient trees, burning abandoned homes, and removing cemetery crosses to prepare the land for flooding. The destruction of their world horrifies the elders, especially Darya, Pavel’s mother, who is determined to preserve her parents’ graves. Her grandson initially helps with the relocation but eventually leaves, troubled by the impact of his actions. As rains fall and the flooding timeline is moved up, families reluctantly burn their own homes before departing, leaving behind only a few elderly women, an old man named Bogodul, and a boy, Kolya. On the eve of her departure, Darya tenderly cleans her home, decorates it with flowers, and watches it burn. The remaining villagers gather in the last standing shed as officials approach the mist-shrouded island at dawn, only to find it elusive in the fog, as if Matyora has already sunk. The final shot of the film shows Matyora’s ancient tree, lush and untouched, symbolizing the enduring spirit of the land despite the loss of the village.

== Cast ==
- Stefaniya Stanyuta as old Darya
- Lev Durov as Pavel Pinegin
- Aleksei Petrenko as Vorontsov
- Leonid Kryuk as Petrukha
- Vadim Yakovenko as Andrei Pinegin
- Yuri Katin-Yartsev as Bogodul
- Denis Luppov as Kolyana

== Production history ==
While scouting locations in June 1979 for her planned adaptation of the ecological fable, original director Larisa Shepitko died in a car accident along with four members of her shooting team. After a delay the project was finally completed in 1981 by her widower Elem Klimov and although shelved for a further two years, was eventually given a limited release in the Soviet Union in 1983. Originally chosen to open the 1984 Berlin Film Festival, it was initially refused an export licence until three years later when it was screened in Berlin. Its release in 1986 aligns it with the new policy of Glasnost under Mikhail Gorbachev's term, which questions both bureaucracy and technological progress. As head of the Union of Cinematographers, Klimov was also responsible for the release of many other banned or shelved films in this era.

== Themes ==
=== Ecology and progress ===
Farewell joins the longstanding tradition of soviet film of inspecting the relationship between technology and nature. Sergei Eisenstein, Dziga Vertov, and Alexander Dovzhenko were all preoccupied with the beauty of the machine whose representation was largely positive until the cultural liberation of the Khrushchev Thaw. The construction of the world's largest dam in Siberia, among other environmentally destructive projects such as the Chernobyl disaster which occurred in the same year of the film's official release, were beginning to bring about ecological degradation that was "too drastic to ignore". The flooding of Matyora in Farewell is a direct reference to and symbolic exploration of the fall-out of such decisions.

Farewell's characters represent the different positions society might take with respect to progress. Darya represents old world ideals of ecological sanctity, she is the “embodiment of passive resistance to technological progress”. Her son, who must evacuate the village, is caught between the two worlds, but his good intentions do not stop him from preparing the town for its destruction. And finally, Darya’s grandson is emblematic of city life, totally unmoored from his traditional roots and helpless against spiritual corruption.

=== Nostalgia ===
In evoking an idyllic village in Siberia, untouched by much of the political upheaval of the twentieth century, Farewell evokes a “mythic land” that signifies to Russians what the Wild West does for Americans. The ancient tree that cannot be uprooted, the intertwining of Christianity and paganism, and the dense myopic fog of the film’s closing scene all represent the nostalgic mood of the late soviet era – the search for lost unity, a displaced identity, and the disorientation of a society robbed of its future.

Klimov reflects the disillusionment of a post-industrial Soviet society which has officially abandoned the rhetoric of attaining communism in any near future.

By romanticizing the simplicity of village life, Farewell uses images of a mythic Russian past to create a longing for an impossible mythic return, "the loss of an enchanted world with clear borders and values". This enchanted world, "post-soviet nostalgia" is a augmented memory which "re-imagines the crash of Communism, as the crash of something very personal, innocent, and full of hope ... that marked childhood and youth". In Farewell, the idyllic Matyora is literally submerged under the weight of progress and time, making remnants of the pre-Soviet past literally and spiritually irretrievable.
