= Elem Klimov =

Soviet filmmaker (1933-2003)

- Элем Климов
- Born: 9 July 1933; Stalingrad, Russian SFSR, Soviet Union
- Died: 26 October 2003 (aged 70); Moscow, Russia
- Resting place: Troyekurovskoye Cemetery, Moscow, Russia
- Education: Moscow Aviation Institute; Gerasimov Institute of Cinematography
- Occupation: Filmmaker
- Known for: Welcome, or No Trespassing, Adventures of a Dentist, Come and See
- Spouse: Larisa Shepitko (m. 1963; died 1979)
- Children: 1

Elem Germanovich Klimov (Russian: Элем Германович Климов; 9 July 1933 – 26 October 2003) was a Soviet and Russian filmmaker. He studied at the Gerasimov Institute of Cinematography, and was married to film director Larisa Shepitko. Klimov is best known for his final film, Come and See (Иди и смотри), which follows a teenage boy in German-occupied Byelorussia during World War Two and which received universal acclaim. His work also includes black comedies, children's movies, and period dramas.

== Early life ==
Elem Klimov was born in Stalingrad into a Russian family, to German Stepanovich Klimov, an investigator who worked at the Central Control Commission of the Communist Party of the Soviet Union, and Kaleria Georgievna Klimova. His parents were staunch communists and his first name was an acronym derived from the names of Engels, Lenin and Marx. Nevertheless, his brother German Klimov stated that his name comes from Elam Harnish — a character of the Burning Daylight novel by Jack London, since their mother was a fan of his. During the Battle of Stalingrad, he, his mother and his baby brother were evacuated from their home and crossed the Volga on a makeshift raft. Klimov would later draw on these experiences for his 1985 film Come and See.

== Film career ==
Klimov's first feature film, 1964's Welcome, or No Trespassing (known in the United Kingdom as No Holiday for Inochkin) was a satire on Soviet bureaucracy in the guise of a children's summer camp adventure story. The film was briefly banned, having been deemed an insult to the Communist Party of the Soviet Union; however, the ban was rescinded after Nikita Khrushchev had a private viewing and authorized its release.

Klimov's second film, Adventures of a Dentist (1965), was a dark comedy about a dentist who is derided by his colleagues for his natural talent of painlessly pulling out teeth. The implication, that society inevitably ostracizes those that are gifted, horrified the censors who told Klimov to change it. When Klimov refused, the film was given the lowest classification, "category three", which meant that it was shown in only 25–78 movie theatres.

Next, Klimov began making a film about Grigori Rasputin called Agony. The road to release took him nine years and many rewrites. Although finished in 1975, the final edit was not released in the USSR until 1985, due to suppressive measures partly because of its orgy scenes and partly because of its relatively nuanced portrait of Emperor Nicholas II. It had been shown in western Europe a few years before. In 1976, Klimov finished a film begun by his teacher Mikhail Romm before the latter's death called And Still I Believe....

=== Wife's death ===
In 1979, Klimov's wife Larisa Shepitko, who recently won the Golden Bear at the Berlin International Film Festival for her 1977 film The Ascent, died in a car accident. She was a passenger in a van with a crew who had been scouting locations for her upcoming film of Valentin Rasputin novel, Farewell to Matyora. The driver fell asleep; all involved were killed. His wife's death had a profound impact on Klimov, and all his subsequent films were tragedies. A year after her death Klimov filmed a 25-minute tribute to his wife entitled Larisa (1980), and subsequently directed Farewell to Matyora. Despite being shelved for two years after completion, Farewell was released in 1983.

=== Come and See ===
Klimov's final film, Come and See, was released in 1985 to worldwide acclaim and won the Golden Prize at the 14th Moscow International Film Festival. The film depicts the experiences of a 15-year-old boy joining the resistance in German-occupied Byelorussia in 1943. Speaking of how the film drew on his own childhood experience of the war, Klimov said, "As a young boy, I had been in hell... Had I included everything I knew and shown the whole truth, even I could not have watched it."

=== Later career ===
In 1986, fresh from the success of Come and See, and with the changes brought by perestroika in the air, Klimov was chosen by his colleagues to be the First Secretary of the Filmmakers' Union following the V Congress of the Soviet Filmmakers. According to some critics and filmmakers, the congress was conducted by Alexander Yakovlev, one of the grey cardinals of perestroika who was unofficially presented there, consulting the activists from time to time.

Klimov's leadership saw the belated release of many of the previously banned films and the reinstatement of several directors who had fallen out of political favor. This period is widely considered as the start of decline of Soviet cinema and the rise of the so-called "chernukha" (roughly "black stuff"), works of artists and journalists, who, freed by glasnost, exposed Soviet reality in the most pessimistic possible light. Klimov was still frustrated by the obstacles that still remained in his way and gave up his post in 1988 to Andrei Smirnov, saying that he wanted to make films again.

Klimov completed no more films after Come and See. His plans included an adaptation of Mikhail Bulgakov's The Master and Margarita, an adaptation of Fyodor Dostoevsky's Demons, and a film about Joseph Stalin. However, none came to fruition. He said in 2000 that he had "lost interest in making films. Everything that was possible I felt I had already done."

== Personal life ==
In 1957, Klimov graduated from the Higher Institute of Aviation in Moscow. He considered a career in journalism before settling on cinema. He enrolled at the state film school, the Gerasimov Institute of Cinematography, where he studied under acclaimed director Efim Dzigan. While a student at the institute, Klimov met Larisa Shepitko, whom he would later marry. Their son Anton was born in 1973.

In 1983, he was a member of the jury at the 33rd Berlin International Film Festival.

He died on 26 October 2003 from brain hypoxia, after six weeks in a coma. He was buried at the Troyekurovskoye Cemetery.

== Filmography ==
- Beware: Vulgarity (1959)
- The Groom (short) (1960)
- Look, the Sky! (1962)
- Welcome, or No Trespassing (1964)
- Adventures of a Dentist (1965)
- Fitil (1968, 1972)
- Sport, Sport, Sport (1970)
- Larisa (documentary short dedicated to Larisa Shepitko) (1980)
- Agony (1981)
- Farewell (1983)
- Come and See (1985)
