= Bobruysk Region =

Former region of the Byelorussian Soviet Socialist Republic

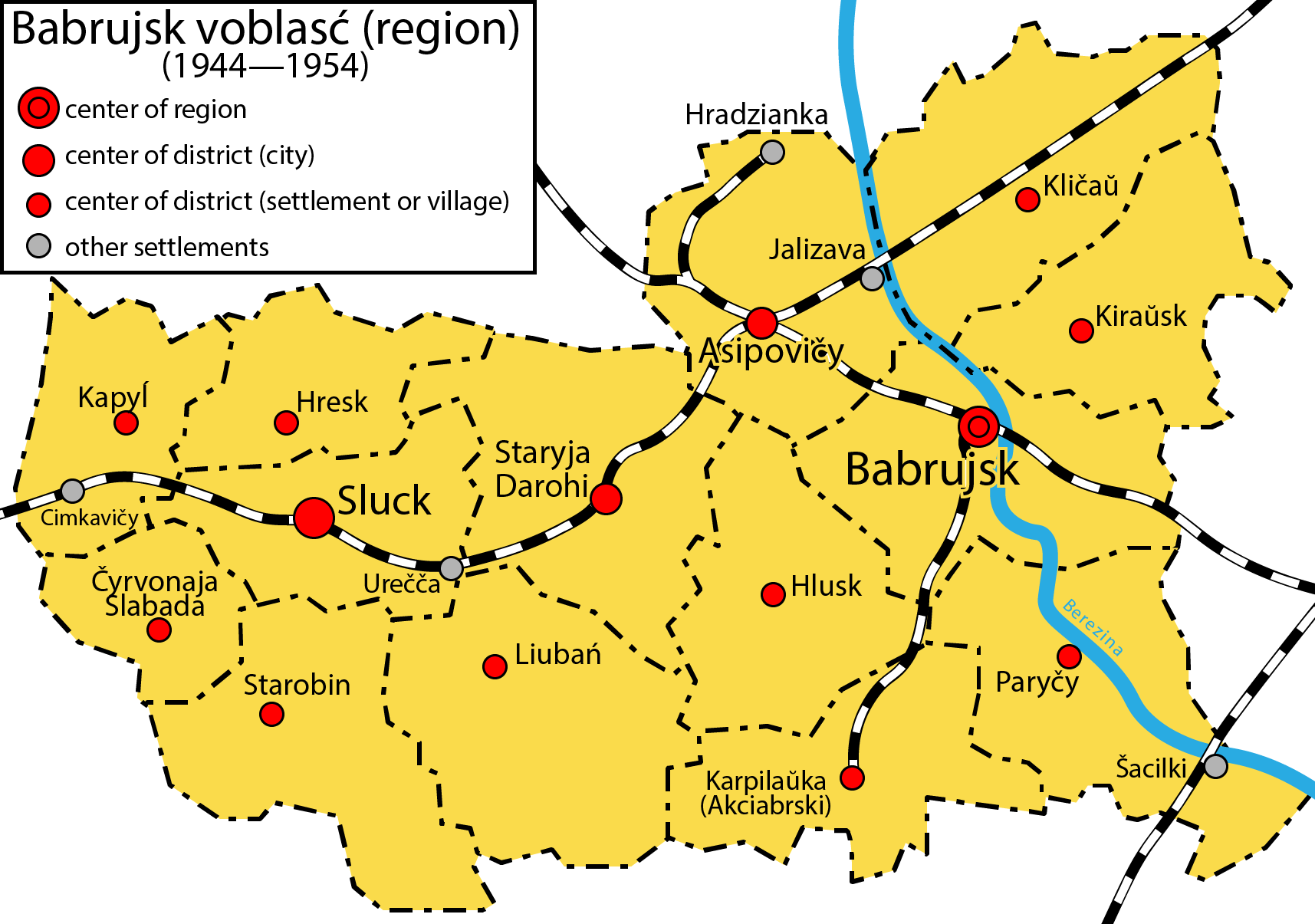

Bobruysk Region or Babruysk Region (Russian: Бобруйская область, romanized: Bobruyskaya oblast; Belarusian: Бабруйская вобласць, romanized: Babruiskaja voblasc), created on 20 September 1944, was an administrative division of Belarus with its administrative centre at Babruysk. On 8 January 1954, the region was abolished and became part of Mogilev Region.
