= Valentin Rasputin =

Russian writer

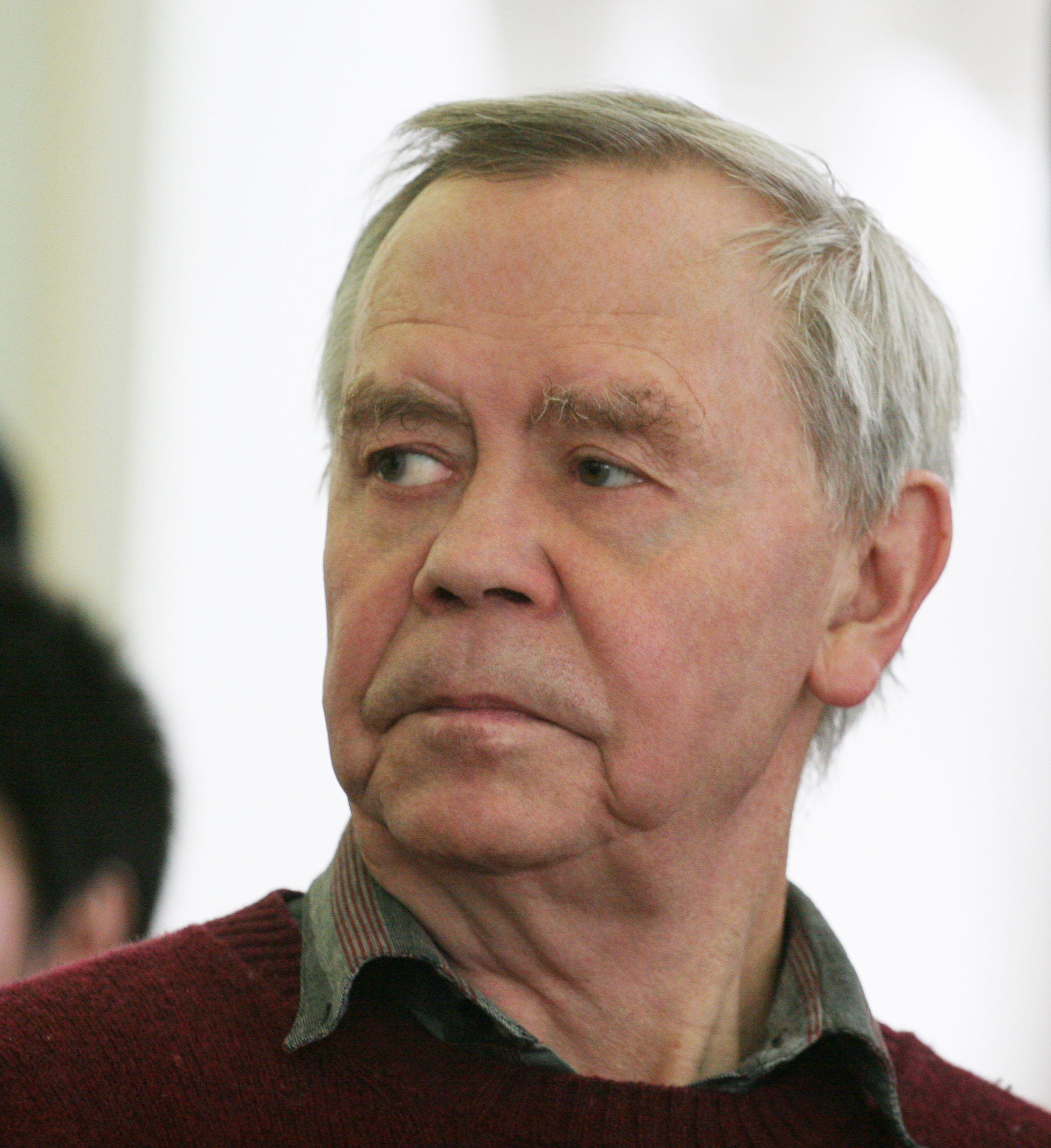
- Rasputin in 2011
- Born: Valentin Grigoryevich Rasputin; 15 March 1937; Ust-Uda, East Siberian Oblast, Russian SFSR, Soviet Union
- Died: 14 March 2015 (aged 77); Moscow, Russia
- Education: Irkutsk State University
- Writing career
- Years active: 1966–2015
- Genre: Fiction
- Notable work: Farewell to Matyora

Valentin Grigoryevich Rasputin (/ræˈspjuːtɪn/; Russian: Валентин Григорьевич Распутин; 15 March 1937 – 14 March 2015) was a Soviet and Russian writer. He was born and lived much of his life in the Irkutsk Oblast in Eastern Siberia. Rasputin's works depict rootless urban characters and the fight for survival of centuries-old traditional rural ways of life, addressing complex questions of ethics and spiritual revival.

== Biography ==
Valentin Rasputin was born in the village of Ust-Uda in East Siberian Oblast. His father, Grigory Rasputin, worked for a village cooperative store, and his mother was a nurse. Soon after his birth the Rasputin family moved to the village of Atalanka in the same Ust-Udinsky District, where Rasputin spent his childhood.

Both villages, then located on the banks of the Angara River, do not exist in their original locations any more, as the Bratsk Reservoir flooded much of the Angara Valley in the 1960s, and the villages were relocated to higher ground. Later, the writer remembered growing up in Siberia as a difficult, but happy time:

"As soon as we kids learned how to walk, we would toddle to the river with our fishing rods; still a tender child, we would run to the taiga, which would begin right outside the village, to pick berries and mushrooms; since young age, we would get into a boat and take the oars..."

When Rasputin finished the 4-year elementary school in Atalanka in 1948, his parents sent the precocious boy to a middle school and then to high school in the district center, Ust-Uda, some 50 km away from his home village. He became the first child from his village to continue his education in this way.

Rasputin graduated from Irkutsk University in 1959 and started working for local Komsomol newspapers in Irkutsk and Krasnoyarsk. He published his first short-story in 1961.

An important point in Rasputin's early literary career was a young writers' seminar in September 1965 in Chita led by Vladimir Chivilikhin, who encouraged the young writer's literary aspirations and recommended him for membership in the prestigious Union of Soviet Writers. Since then Rasputin has considered Chivilikhin his "literary godfather".

In 1967, after the publication of his Money for Maria, Rasputin was indeed admitted to the Union of Soviet Writers. Over the next three decades he published a number of novels – many became both widely popular among the Russian reading public and critically acclaimed.

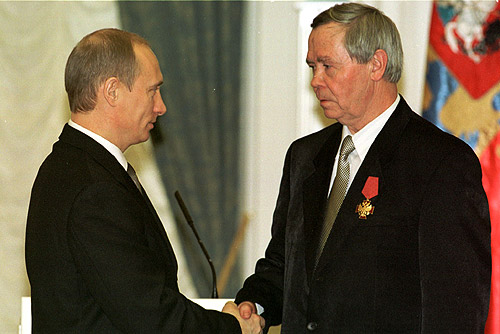
Rasputin being awarded the Order "For Merit to the Fatherland" by President Vladimir Putin, 2002

In 1980, after researching the Battle of Kulikovo for two years, Rasputin was baptised by an Orthodox priest in nearby Yelets.

Rasputin's literary work is closely connected to his activism on social and environmental issues. Throughout the 1970s and 1980s Rasputin, called by some the leading figure of the "Siberian environmental lobby", took an active part in the campaign for protection of Lake Baikal and against the diversion of Siberian fresh water to Central Asian republics. In the 1990s he participated in the nationalist opposition movement. Having spent most of his adult life in Irkutsk, Rasputin remained one of the leading intellectual figures of this Siberian city.

He was a guest for many events in the city of Irkutsk, including the unveilings of the monuments to Tsar Alexander III, Alexander Vampilov and Alexander Kolchak. He organized the readers' conference in Irkutsk Central Scientific Library named after Molchanov-Sibirsky.

Rasputin's daughter Maria died in the 2006 crash of S7 Airlines Flight 778, and his wife died six years later. He died in Moscow on 14 March 2015, a day short of his 78th birthday. Patriarch Kirill of the Russian Orthodox Church conducted his funeral service, and President Vladimir Putin paid his respects.

== Rasputin's writing ==
Rasputin is closely associated with a movement in post-war Soviet literature known as Village Prose (деревенская проза). Beginning in the time of the Khrushchev Thaw (оттепель), village prose was praised for its stylistic and thematic departures from socialist realism. Village prose works usually focused on the hardships of the Soviet peasantry, espoused an idealized picture of traditional village life, and implicitly or explicitly criticized official modernization projects. Rasputin's 1979 novel Farewell to Matyora, which depicts a fictional Siberian village which is to be evacuated and cleared so that a hydroelectric dam can be constructed further down the Angara River, was considered the epitome of this genre. The opening paragraph below is a good example of Rasputin's writing style (exceptional even for the village prose writers), and the novel's theme of natural cycles disrupted by modernization:

Once more spring had come, one more in the never-ending cycle, but for Matyora this spring would be the last, the last for both the island and the village that bore the same name. Once more, rumbling passionately, the ice broke, piling up mounds on the banks, and the liberated Angara River opened up, stretching out into a mighty, sparkling flow. Once more the water gushed boisterously at the island’s upper tip, before cascading down both channels of the riverbed; once more greenery flared on the ground and in the greens, the first rains soaked the earth, the swifts and swallows flew back, and at dusk in the bogs the awakened frogs croaked their love of life. It had all happened many times before. (From Rasputin's novel Farewell to Matyora, translated by Antonina W. Bouis, 1979)

Rasputin's nonfiction works contain similar themes, often in support of relevant political causes. He directed particularly trenchant criticism at large-scale dam building, like the project that flooded his own hometown, and water management projects, like the diversion of the Siberian rivers to Central Asia. He argued that these projects were destructive not simply in an ecological sense, but in a moral sense as well.

In Siberia, Siberia (first published in 1991), Rasputin compares what he considers modern moral relativism with the traditional beliefs of the people of Russkoye Ustye, who believed in reincarnation. According to Rasputin, when burying their dead, the Russkoye Ustye settlers would often bore a hole in the coffin, to make it easier for the soul to come back to be reborn; but if the deceased was a bad person, they would drive an aspen stake through the grave, to keep his soul from ever coming back into the world of living again. The writer is not ambiguous as to which category the souls of the "modernizers" should belong:

When reflecting on the actions of today's "river-rerouting" father figures, who are destroying our sacred national treasures up hill and down with the haste of an invading army, you involuntarily turn to this experience: it would not be a bad idea for them to know that not everything is forgiven at the time of death.

Some critics accused Rasputin of idealizing village life and slipping into anti-modern polemics. The journal Voprosy literatury published an ongoing debate on the question, "Is the Village Prose of Valentin Rasputin Anti-Modern?"

== Political views ==
By the end of perestroika Rasputin became publicly active. He criticized Mikhail Gorbachev's reforms from patriotic and nationalistic positions. His repetition (at the 1st Congress of People's Deputies of the Soviet Union) of Stolypin's statement "You need great upheavals. We need a great country" («Вам нужны великие потрясения. Нам нужна великая страна») made it a phrase commonly used by the anti-liberal opposition.

He also signed several open letters, most notably the "Letter of Russian Writers" (also known as the "Letter of the Seventy-Four") addressed to the President and the Supreme Soviet of the Soviet Union and published in the Literary Newspaper and Nash Sovremennik in 1990. 74 writers expressed concern regarding the rise of Russophobia in mass media and "fabrication of the "Russian fascism" myth while the Zionist ideology is getting quick rehabilitation and idealization". The letter was criticized by opponents who labeled the signers as "antisemites"; many of them later signed what is considered their answer — the "Letter of Forty-Two". Rasputin himself argued that his alleged antisemitic statements have been exaggerated and taken out of context. In July 1991, Rasputin along with 11 other public and political figures signed another open letter "A Word to the People".

In 1992, Valentin Rasputin joined the National Salvation Front (a coalition of radical opposition forces), nominally belonging to its leadership. He later supported the CPRF and its leader, Gennady Zyuganov.

In 2014, he signed a public letter supporting the annexation of Crimea by Russia in 2014.

== Awards ==
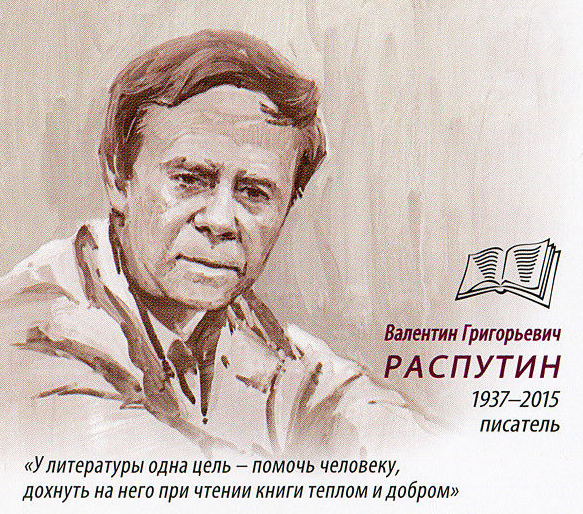
A fragment of the 2017 Russian postcard featuring Rasputin and his quote: "Literature has only one goal – to help humans by giving them warmth and kindness"

- USSR State Prize, 1977. The prize was awarded for his novel To Live and Remember, the protagonist of which was a deserter during the war.
- Order of Lenin, 1984
- UNEP Global 500 Roll of Honour, 1988.
- Solzhenitsyn Prize, 2000

== Bibliography ==
- Василий и Василиса, 1966 (Vasili and Vasilissa; Published in English translation by Progress Publishers, 1981) ISBN 99923-812-0-5
- Деньги для Марии, 1967 (Money for Maria; Published in English translation by Raduga Publishers, 1998) ISBN 5-05-002447-1
- Последний срок, 1970 (The Last Term)
- Живи и помни, 1974 (Live and Remember; Published in English translation by Northwestern University Press, 1992) ISBN 0-8101-1053-9
- Прощание с Матёрой, 1976 (Farewell to Matyora; Published in English translation by Northwestern University Press, 1991) ISBN 0-8101-1329-5
- Век живи — век люби: Рассказы, 1982 (You Live and Love: Stories; Published in English translation by Vanguard Press, 1986) ISBN 0-8149-0916-7
- Пожар, 1985 (The Fire)
- Дочь Ивана, Мать Ивана, 2004 ("Ivan's daughter, Ivan's mother")
- Siberia on Fire: Stories and Essays, 1989 (compiled and translated into English by Gerald Mikkelson and Margaret Winchell for Northern Illinois University Press) ISBN 0-87580-547-7
- What Should I Tell the Crow?, (short story), from The New Soviet Fiction, Abbeville Press, 1989 ISBN 0-89659-881-0
- Ivan’s Daughter: Short Stories and a Novella, 2016 (compiled and translated into English by Margaret Winchell for Three String Books, an imprint of Slavica Publishers) ISBN 978-0-89357-454-3

Non-fiction:

- Сибирь, Сибирь..., 1991 (English translation: Siberia, Siberia. Translated by Margaret Winchell, Gerald Mikkelson. Northwestern University Press, 1996. ISBN 0-8101-1575-1. Partial text on Google Books)

== Adaptations ==
- 1969 — Rudolfio, dir. Dinara Asanova — story of the same name
- 1978 — French Lessons, dir. Yevgeny Tashkov — story of the same name
- 1979 — Money for Maria, dir. György Lengyel (Hungary) — story of the same name
- 1980 — The Last Frontier, dir. Timo Bergholm (Finland) — novel The Last Term
- 1980 — Meeting, dir. Alexander Itygilov — story of the same name
- 1980 — Selling Bear Fur, dir. Alexander Itygilov — story of the same name
- 1981 — Farewell, dir. Elem Klimov — novel Farewell to Matyora
- 1983 — We Live and Love from the Special Case anthology, dir. Valery Pendrakovsky — story of the same name
- 1981 — Vasily and Vasilisa, dir. Irina Poplavskaya — story of the same name
- 1985 — Money for Maria, dir. Vladimir Andreev, Viktor Khramov — story of the same name
- 1987 — Farewell, Little Island, dir. Sándor Reisenbüchler (Hungary) — novel Farewell to Matyora
- 1991 — Rudolfio, dir. Vasily Davidchuk — story of the same name
- 2008 — Live and Remember, dir. Aleksandr Proshkin — novel of the same name

== See also ==
- Village Prose
