= Farewell to Matyora =

1976 novel by Valentin Rasputin

Farewell to Matyora (Russian: Прощание с Матёрой) is a 1976 novel by Valentin Rasputin. The novel treats Rasputin's major theme of the baneful impact of industrialization and urbanization on peasant life. It is considered a classic example of the village prose literary movement.

The book was adapted into the 1983 film Farewell, directed by Elem Klimov.
