= Christina Hendricks on screen and stage =

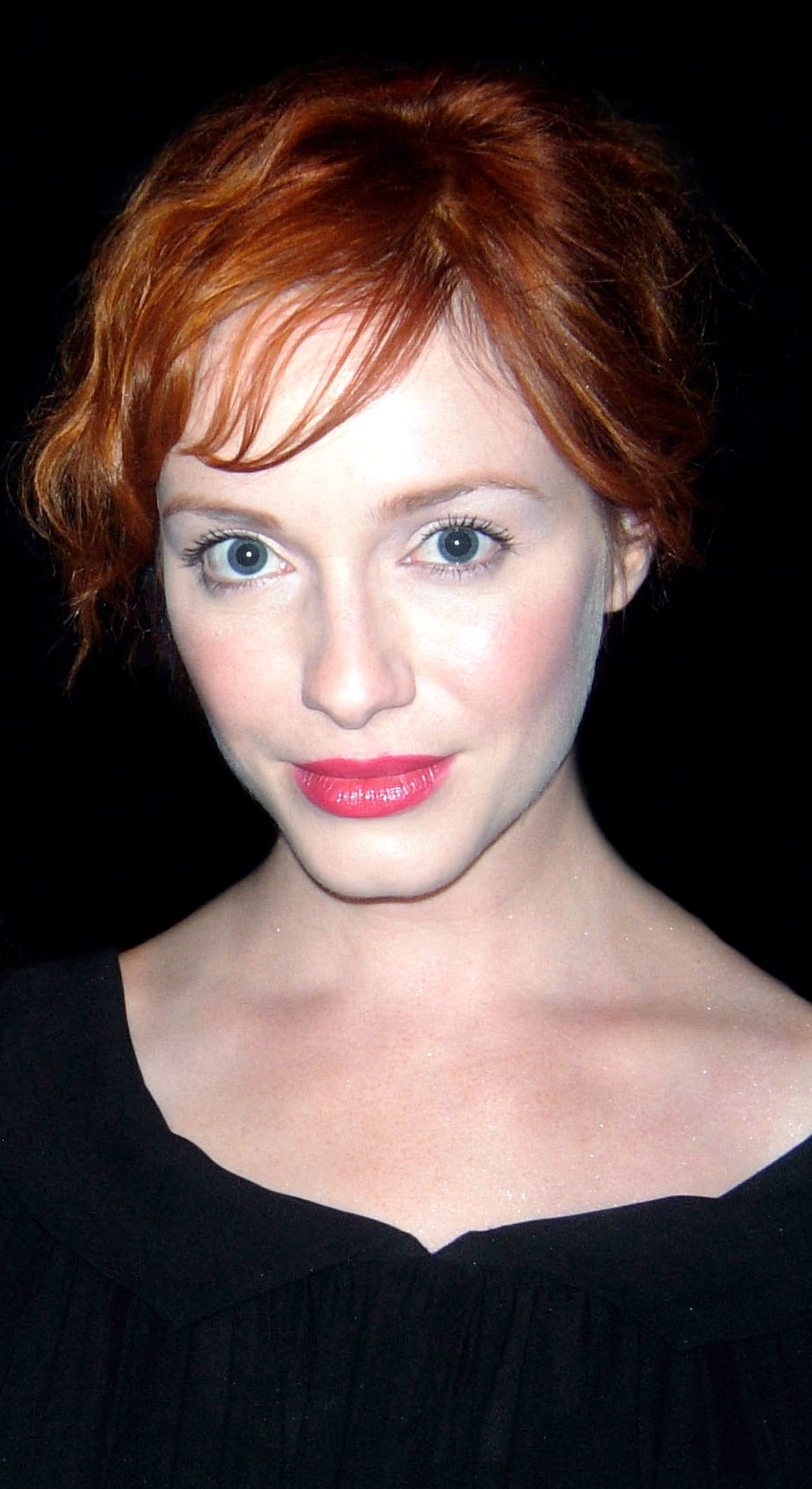
Hendricks in 2008

Christina Hendricks is an American actress of film, stage, television and video games, whose accolades include six Primetime Emmy Award nominations, and two Screen Actors Guild Awards. Hendricks began her career as a model in the early 1990s before transitioning into acting in commercials. Her first substantial role was on the MTV series Undressed (1999), after which she was cast in the series Beggars and Choosers (1999–2001). After appearances on Firefly (2002–03) and several other series, she was cast as Joan Holloway on the AMC series Mad Men (2007–15), which earned her a total of six Emmy Award nominations over its seven-season run, as well as two Screen Actors Guild Awards for Best Ensemble.

While on Mad Men, Hendricks ventured into film, appearing in several independent features before being cast in a supporting part in Nicolas Winding Refn's thriller Drive (2011). Other film credits during this period include Sally Potter's Ginger & Rosa (2012), and Ryan Gosling's directorial debut Lost River (2014), in which she played the lead. Following Mad Men's conclusion, Hendricks reunited with Refn for a minor role in his horror film The Neon Demon (2016), as well as starring on the Comedy Central series Another Period (2015–16). Subsequent film credits include the horror slasher film The Strangers: Prey at Night (2018), the drama American Woman (2019), and the Disney animated sequel Toy Story 4 (2019). Hendricks has also appeared on television with roles in the anthology series The Romanoffs (2018), the crime drama series Tin Star (2017–19), and the NBC comedy series Good Girls (2018–21).

== Film ==
| Year | Title | Role | Notes | Ref. |
|---|---|---|---|---|
| 2007 | La Cucina | Lily | | |
| 2007 | South of Pico | Angela | | |
| 2010 | Leonie | Catherine | | |
| 2010 | Life as We Know It | Alison Novack | | |
| 2011 | All-Star Superman | Lois Lane/Superwoman | Voice; direct-to-DVD | |
| 2011 | Detachment | Ms. Sarah Madison | | |
| 2011 | Drive | Blanche | | |
| 2011 | Company | April | Filmed production | |
| 2011 | From Up on Poppy Hill | Saori Makimura | Voice; English dub | |
| 2011 | The Family Tree | Alicia | | |
| 2011 | I Don't Know How She Does It | Allison | | |
| 2012 | Struck By Lightning | April | | |
| 2012 | Ginger & Rosa | Natalie | | |
| 2014 | God's Pocket | Jeannie Scarpato | | |
| 2014 | The Pirate Fairy | Zarina | Voice | |
| 2014 | Lost River | Billy | | |
| 2015 | Dark Places | Patty Day | | |
| 2016 | Zoolander 2 | Seductress | | |
| 2016 | The Neon Demon | Roberta Hoffman | | |
| 2016 | Bad Santa 2 | Diane Hastings | | |
| 2017 | Fist Fight | Miss Monet | | |
| 2017 | Crooked House | Brenda Leonides | | |
| 2017 | Pottersville | Connie Greiger | | |
| 2018 | Westwood: Punk, Icon, Activist | Herself | Documentary | |
| 2018 | The Strangers: Prey at Night | Cindy | | |
| 2018 | Egg | Karen | | |
| 2018 | Candy Jar | Amy Skinner | | |
| 2018 | American Woman | Katherine | | |
| 2019 | Toy Story 4 | Gabby Gabby | Voice | |
| 2020 | Scoob! | Officer Jaffe | Voice; Cameo | |
| 2022 | The Storied Life of A.J. Fikry | Ismay Evans | Also executive producer | |

== Television ==
| Year | Title | Role | Notes | Ref. |
|---|---|---|---|---|
| 1999 | Undressed | Rhiannon | 4 episodes | |
| 1999 | Sorority | Fawn | Pilot | |
| 2000 | Angel | Bar maid | Episode: "The Prodigal" | |
| 2000–2001 | Beggars and Choosers | Kelly Kramer | 19 episodes | |
| 2001 | Thieves | Sunday | Episode: "Casino" | |
| 2002 | ER | Joyce Westlake | 4 episodes | |
| 2002 | The Court | Betsy Tyler | 6 episodes | |
| 2002 | The Big Time | Audrey Drummond | Television film | |
| 2002–03 | Firefly | Saffron/Bridget/Yolanda | 2 episodes | |
| 2003 | Miss Match | Sarah | Episode: "The Price of Love" | |
| 2003 | Presidio Med | Claire | Episode: "Suffer Unto Me the Children..." | |
| 2003 | Hunger Point | Frannie Hunter | Television film | |
| 2004 | Tru Calling | Alyssa | Episode: "Murder in the Morgue" | |
| 2004–05 | Kevin Hill | Nicolette Raye | 22 episodes | |
| 2005 | Cold Case | Esther "Legs" Davis | Episode: "Colors" | |
| 2006 | Jake in Progress | Tanya | 4 episodes | |
| 2006 | Las Vegas | Connie | Episode: "Chaos Theory" | |
| 2006 | Without a Trace | Rachel Gibson | Episode: "Check Your Head" | |
| 2007 | Notes from the Underbelly | Holly | Episode: "First Night Out" | |
| 2007–08 | Life | Olivia Canton | 4 episodes | |
| 2007–15 | Mad Men | Joan Holloway | Main cast; 80 episodes | |
| 2011 | Body of Proof | Karen Archer | Episode: "Dead Man Walking" | |
| 2011 | American Dad! | Naydern (voice) | Episode: "Gorillas in the Mist" | |
| 2015–16 | Another Period | Chair (formerly Celine) | 17 episodes | |
| 2015, 2023 | Rick and Morty | Unity (voice) | Episodes: "Auto Erotic Assimilation", "Air Force Wong" | |
| 2016 | Hap and Leonard | Trudy | 6 episodes | |
| 2017–19 | Tin Star | Elizabeth Bradshaw | 15 episodes | |
| 2018 | Robot Chicken | Various voices | Episode: "Ext. Forest - Day" | |
| 2018 | The Romanoffs | Olivia Rogers | Episode: "House of Special Purpose" | |
| 2018–21 | Good Girls | Beth Boland | Main cast, also producer (season 4) | |
| 2020–25 | Solar Opposites | Cherie (voice) | 18 episodes | |
| 2023 | Agent Elvis | Roxanne Ryder (voice) | 2 episodes | |
| 2023–25 | The Buccaneers | Patricia "Patti" St. George | Main cast | |
| 2024 | Grimsburg | Anna (voice) | Episode: "And the Winner is… Murder!" | |
| 2024 | Hacks | Gay Republican / Megan | Episode: "Par for the Course" | |
| 2025 | Small Town, Big Story | Wendy Patterson | Main cast; also executive producer | |
| 2025 | Good American Family | Cynthia Mans | Recurring role | |
| 2025 | Universal Basic Guys | Jessica (voice) | Episode: "Machine Yearning" | |
| TBA | Reputation | Davina Knight | Main cast | |

== Video games ==
| Year | Title | Role |
|---|---|---|
| 2011 | Need for Speed: The Run | Sam Harper (voice) |

== Audio dramas ==
| Year | Title | Role | Notes |
|---|---|---|---|
| 2022 | Quiet Part Loud | Allied Alice (voice) | Spotify podcast |

== Stage ==
| Year | Title | Role | Notes | Ref. |
|---|---|---|---|---|
| 2011 | Company | April | Lincoln Center for the Performing Arts | |
