= Jacky Lansley =

British choreographer

Jacky Lansley is a British choreographer, writer and performance maker. Classically trained, Lansley performed at the Royal Ballet before seeking a new way of using her art form to make a political stance, something she described as becoming a 'speaking dancer'. Since being a founding member of the X6 Dance Space in 1976, she has been a major influence and pioneer of the independent and feminist dance scene in the UK.

== Life and career ==
In 1972 Lansley began choreographing for Richard Alston CBE's Strider dance company. In 1974-1977 along with Sally Potter and Rose English, Lansley co-founded Limited Dance Company with a focus on performance based art.

During the 80s and 90s she worked as a movement director and choreographer within mainstream theatre at The Royal Court, The Old Vic, Liverpool Playhouse, Bristol Old Vic, Almeida, York Minster, Hall for Cornwall and Manchester Royal Exchange. She also worked on several feature films as a choreographer and performer directed by Sally Potter including Orlando, The London Story, The Gold Diggers and The Man Who Cried.

Lansley set up Dance Research studio in 2002 in Shoreditch, London. It is a research centre for interdisciplinary dance training and performance. The studio has supported the development of her key works: Holding Space (2004), View From the Shore (2007) and Guest Suites (2012) - all performed in the Clore Studio at the Royal Opera House - Standing Stones (2008, York Minster, and UK cathedral tour) and About Us (2019) in partnership with Modern Art Oxford. Practitioners who have been associated with the studio include Esther Huss, Jreena Green, Ursula Early, Tim Taylor, Ingrid Mackinnon, Sylvia Hallett, Vincent Ebrahim, Grace Nicol and Fergus Early.

In 2018 Lansley was awarded the Jane Attenborough One Dance UK Award - for an individual working in dance who has made an outstanding contribution to the art form.

== Published works ==
- Choreographies, Tracing the Materials of an Ephemeral Art Form, 2017
- The Wise Body, Conversations with Experienced Dancers, 2011
