= Christopher Sheppard =

British film producer

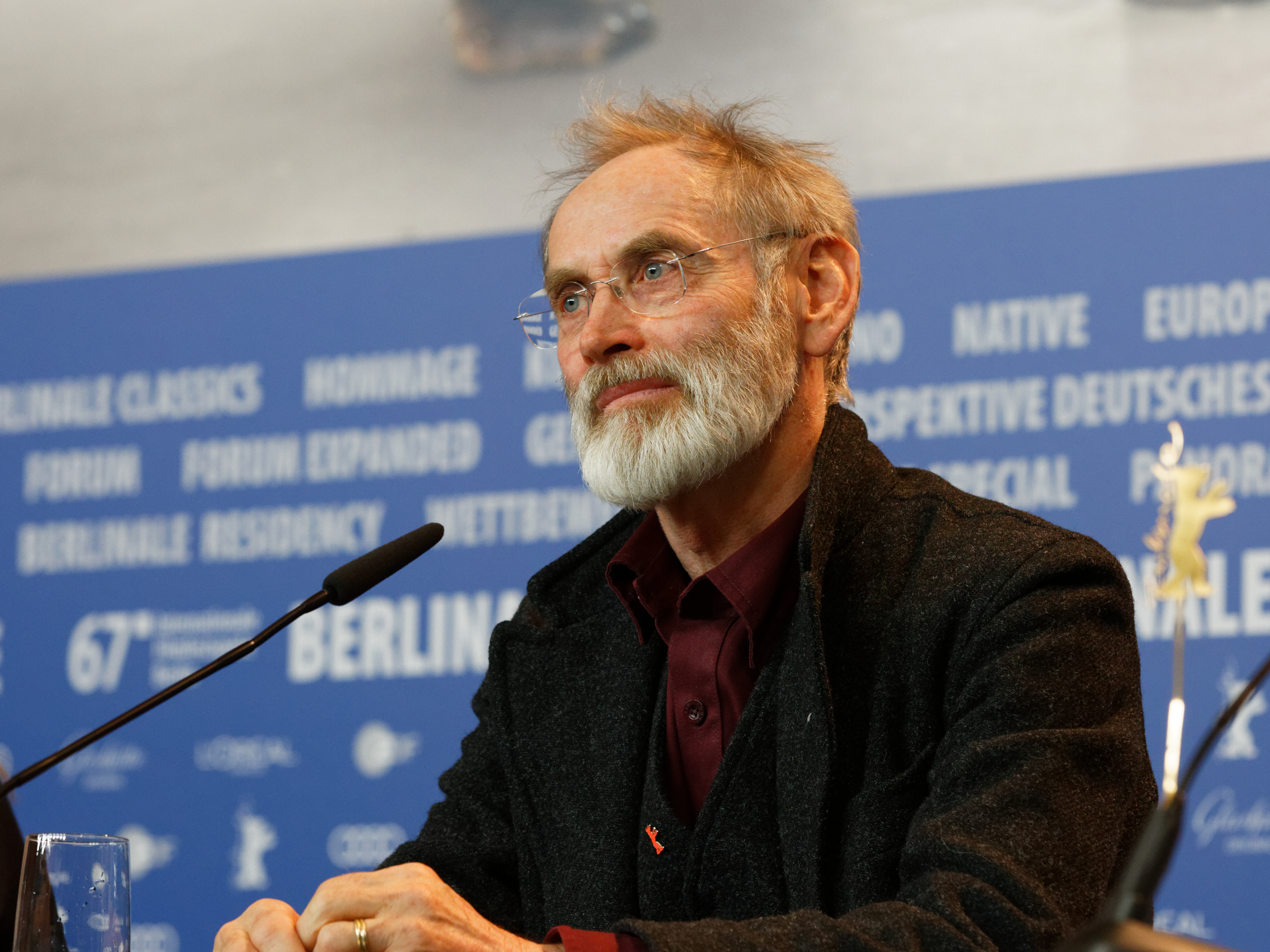
- Christopher Sheppard in 2017
- Occupation: Film producer

Christopher Sheppard is a British film producer who has produced Oscar-nominated films. He co-founded Adventure Pictures with Sally Potter in 1990. He is known for conglomerating independent film companies from a wide span of countries for his productions.

== Producer credits ==
- Orlando (1992)
- The Tango Lesson (1997)
- The Man Who Cried (2000)
- Eisenstein (2000, executive)
- Yes (2004)
- Rage (2009)
- Ginger & Rosa (2012)
- The Party (2017)
- The Roads Not Taken (2020)
