= Big Time =

Big Time or The Big Time may refer to:

== Film and television ==
- Big Time (1929 film), a film starring Lee Tracy and Mae Clarke
- Big Time (1977 film), a film produced by Motown Productions
- Big Time (1988 film), a concert film featuring Tom Waits
- Big Time (1989 film), a TV movie featuring Paul Guilfoyle
- Big Time (2001 film), a film featuring Mark Valley
- The Big Time (2002 film), a 2002 TV movie starring Molly Ringwald and Christina Hendricks
- Big Time (2004 film), a film starring Matthew McGrory
- The Big Time (TV series), a 1976–1980 British documentary series
- The Big Time (South African TV series), a drama series starring Frank Opperman
- Steve Harvey's Big Time Challenge or Big Time, an American comedy/variety television show
- "The Big Time" (Sex and the City), an episode of Sex and the City

== Literature ==
- The Big Time (novel), a 1957 novel by Fritz Leiber
- "Spider-Man: Big Time", a run of comic book storylines in The Amazing Spider-Man
- The Big Time (play), a 2019 play by David Williamson
- Big Time, a play by Keith Reddin
- Big Time, weekly newspaper supplement published by Disney Magazine Publishing

== Music ==
- Big Time Records, an Australian record label

=== Albums ===
- Big Time (Little Texas album)
- Big Time (Tom Waits album)
- Big Time (Trace Adkins album), and the title song
- Big Time (Ultra album), and the title song
- Big Time (soundtrack), a soundtrack album for the 1977 film, by Smokey Robinson
- The Big Time (album), a 2002 album by Robin Holcomb
- Big Time (Angel Olsen album)

=== Songs ===
- "Big Time" (Trace Adkins song), 1997
- "Big Time" (Big & Rich song), 2005
- "Big Time" (C. C. Catch song), 1989
- "Big Time" (Peter Gabriel song), 1986
- "Big Time" (Whigfield song), 1995
- "Big Time", by Neil Young from Broken Arrow
- "Big Time", by Rick James from Garden of Love
- "Big Time", by Seal from Seal 6: Commitment
- "Big Time", by Vince Staples from Prima Donna

== See also ==
- The Big Timer, 1932 American drama film
- Big Timers, 1945 American musical comedy film
