= Aleksei Rodionov (cinematographer) =

Russian cinematographer (born 1947)

- Алексей Родионов
- Born: Aleksei Borisovich Rodionov; April 26, 1947 (age 79); Moscow, Soviet Union
- Occupation: cinematographer

Aleksei Borisovich Rodionov (Russian: Алексей Борисович Родионов; born April 26, 1947) is a Russian cinematographer. He was the cinematographer for several films by the English director and screenwriter Sally Potter.

== Life ==
Rodionov was trained as a cinematographer at the Gerasimov Institute of Cinematography in Moscow. After graduating in 1972, he initially worked as a camera assistant, including for Sergei Urusevsky on his final film, Sing Your Song, Poet (1972), a film biography of the Russian lyric poet Sergei Yesenin. For Elem Germanovich Klimov, Rodionov shot the drama Farewell and the acclaimed anti-war film Come and See.

In 1992, he was hired by Sally Potter for her film Orlando. He also worked as cinematographer on two further films by Potter: Yes (2004) and The Party (2017).

Rodionov teaches at the Moscow School of New Cinema. He has been nominated for several film awards. In 2009, he received the Golden Eagle Award together with Igor Grinyakin for the film Admiral.

== Filmography ==
- Farewell (1983)
- Among Grey Stones (1983)
- Come and See (1985)
- Orlando (1992)
- A Moslem (1995)
- Passion in the Desert (1998)
- Talk of Angels (1998)
- Cinderella (2000)
- Eisenstein (2000)
- Where Eskimos Live (2002)
- Yes (2004)
- Admiral (2008)
- Generation P (2008)
- The Party (2017)
- We Need to Make Films about Love (2024)

== Awards ==
- 1990, nominated for Best Cinematographer at Nika Award (Zhena kerosinshchika)
- 1996, nominated for Best Cinematographer at Nika Award (A Moslem)
- 2009, won Golden Eagle Award (Admiral, shared with Igor Grinyakin)
