= The Tango Lesson =

- Theatrical release poster: Potter and Verón dance below Jacob wrestling with the angel by Eugène Delacroix
- Directed by: Sally Potter
- Written by: Sally Potter
- Produced by: Christopher Sheppard; Oscar Kramer
- Starring: Sally Potter; Pablo Verón
- Cinematography: Robby Müller
- Edited by: Hervé Schneid
- Music by: Fred Frith; Sally Potter
- Distributed by: Sony Pictures Classics
- Release date: 29 August 1997 (Italy)
- Running time: 101 minutes
- Countries: Argentina; United Kingdom; France; Germany; Netherlands
- Languages: English; Spanish; French

The Tango Lesson (Spanish: La lección de tango) is a 1997 drama film written and directed by Sally Potter. It is a semi-autobiographical film starring Potter and Pablo Verón, about Argentinian Tango. The film, a co-production of Argentina, France, Germany, Netherlands and the United Kingdom, was produced by Christopher Sheppard in Britain and Oscar Kramer in Argentina, and was shot mostly in black and white in Paris and Buenos Aires. The soundtrack includes original recordings of Carlos Gardel's Mi Buenos Aires querido and Ástor Piazzolla's Libertango, two of the most iconic tangos in the history of the genre. It also includes an original song written and sung by Potter.

== Plot ==
Sally, a filmmaker and screenwriter suffering from writer's block, is dissatisfied with her film project, a murder mystery called Rage, which features the fashion industry. Taking a break, she travels to Paris, where she sees the dancer Pablo (Pablo Verón) performing tango. She becomes obsessed with the dance and offers Pablo a part in her film in exchange for dance lessons. The two become deeply involved as dancers and as lovers. Their emotional intimacy threatens the success of their dancing together. The film explores the conflict between the woman dancer accepting the man's lead in the dance, while the man must accept the woman's lead in the film. It is a love story and a showcase for Verón's dancing.

== Cast ==
- Sally Potter as Sally
- Pablo Verón as Pablo
- Morgane Maugran as Red Model
- Géraldine Maillet as Yellow Model
- Katerina Mechera as Blue Model
- David Toole as Fashion Designer
- George Yiasoumi as Photographer
- Michele Parent as Seamstress
- Claudine Mavros as Seamstress
- Monique Couturier as Seamstress
- Matthew Hawkins as Bodyguard
- Simon Worgan as Bodyguard
- Carolina Iotti as Pablo's partner
- Zobeida as Pablo's Friend
- Orazio Massaro as Pablo's Friend
- Gustavo Naveira as Gustavo
- Fabián Salas as Fabian
- Carlos Copello as Carlos
- María Noel as Film Executive
- Gregory Dayton as Film Executive

== Distribution ==
The film was first presented at the Venice Film Festival in Italy on 29 August 1997. It was screened at the Toronto International Film Festival in Canada on 8 September. The picture screened at various film festivals, including the Mar del Plata Film Festival in Argentina, the Reykjavik Film Festival in Iceland, the Istanbul Film Festival in Turkey, and others.

== Film soundtrack ==
- Milonga Triste composed by Sebastián Piana and Homero Manzi, performed by Hugo Díaz y su Conjunto, recorded in Buenos Aires in 1972.
- Now composed by Sally Potter & Fred Frith, sung by Sally Potter, recorded in Paris 1996.
- Quejas de bandoneón composed by Juan de Dios Filiberto, performed by Aníbal Troilo y su Orquesta típica, recorded in Buenos Aires in 1958.
- Red, yellow, blue composed by Sally Potter & Fred Frith, recorded in Paris in 1996.
- Mi Buenos Aires querido composed by Carlos Gardel and Alfredo Le Pera, sung by Carlos Gardel, recorded in New York in 1934.
- El flete composed by Gerónimo Gradito and Vicente Greco, performed by Juan D'Arienzo y su Orquesta Típica, recorded in Buenos Aires in 1936.
- Rage composed by Sally Potter & Fred Frith, sung by Sally Potter, recorded in Paris in 1996.
- Zum composed by Astor Piazzolla, performed by Osvaldo Pugliese y su Orquesta, recorded in Buenos Aires in 1973.
- Amor y celos composed by Miguel Padula & Alfredo F. Roldán, performed by Juan D'Arienzo y su Orquesta Típica, recorded in Buenos Aires in 1936.
- Doyna composed by Frank London, David Licht & David Krakauer, performed by The Klezmatics, recorded in New York in 1994.
- Danse de cuisine composed by Sally Potter & Fred Frith, sung by Sally Potter, recorded in Paris in 1996.
- Pensalo bien composed by Juan Jose Visiglio, Nola Lopez & Julio Alberto, sung by Alberto Echague with the Juan D'Arienzo y su Orquesta Típica, recorded in Buenos Aires in 1938.
- La yumba composed by Osvaldo Pugliese, performed by Osvaldo Pugliese y su Orquesta, recorded in Buenos Aires in 1946.
- Jacob and the angel composed by Sally Potter & Fred Frith, sung by Sally Potter, recorded in Paris in 1996.
- Milonga de mis amores composed by Pedro B. Laurenz & José Maria Contursi, performed by Juan D'Arienzo y su Orquesta Típica, recorded in Buenos Aires in 1970.
- Gallo ciego, composed by Agustín Bardi, performed by Osvaldo Pugliese y su Orquesta, recorded in Buenos Aires in 1959.
- Libertango composed by Astor Piazzolla, performed by Astor Piazzolla & orchestra, recorded in Milan in 1974.
- Bahia Blanca composed by Carlos di Sarli, performed by Carlos Di Sarli y su Orquesta Típica, recorded in Buenos Aires in 1958.
- I am you, composed by Sebastian Piana & Homero Manzi with English lyrics by Sally Potter, sung by Sally Potter with Yo-Yo Ma (cello), Nestor E. Marconi (bandoneon), Antonio Agri (violin), Leonardo D. Marconi (piano) & Horacio Malvicino (guitar), recorded in Buenos Aires in 1997.
- Libertango (reprise) composed by Astor Piazzolla, performed by Yo-Yo Ma (cello), Antonio Agri (violin), Nestor E. Marconi (bandoneon), Horacio Malvicino (guitar).

=== Exhibition dates ===
- Argentina: 20 November 1997
- France: 8 April 1998
- Germany: 9 October 1997
- Netherlands: 15 January 1998
- United Kingdom: 28 November 1997
- United States: 14 November 1997

== Critical reception ==
On the review aggregator website Rotten Tomatoes, 52% of 23 critics' reviews are positive. Metacritic, which uses a weighted average, assigned the film a score of 65 out of 100, based on 6 critics, indicating "generally favorable" reviews.

New York Times film critic, Janet Maslin, thought the film was rather simple, writing: "Stiffly playing a filmmaker with a growing passion for the tango, [Sally Potter] makes this a handsome, dryly meticulous film with no real fire anywhere beyond its supple dance scenes. The lessons are numbered and cataloged with an obsessive care like that of Peter Greenaway, but this material has little of his corresponding complexity."

Chicago Sun-Times film critic Roger Ebert discussed in his review the film's major goal, writing, "Most dances are for people who are falling in love. The tango is a dance for those who have survived it, and are still a little angry about having their hearts so mishandled. The Tango Lesson is a movie for people who understand that difference."

Edward Guthmann, San Francisco Chronicle staff critic, lauded the film and Potter's direction, and wrote: "British director Sally Potter stuck her neck out when she made The Tango Lesson, a fictionalized account of her relationship with Argentine tango master Pablo Veron...Potter takes what seemed like a recipe for embarrassment and excess and delivers a film that's sweet and understated and devoid of diva posturing...[the film is] smoothly directed, nicely written and falters only in the performance that Potter was able to squeeze out of herself while performing her multiple tasks." In terms of criticism, Guthmann suggested Potter should have cast another actor in her role.

== Awards ==
Wins

- Mar del Plata Film Festival: Best Film, Sally Potter; 1997.
- National Board of Review: Special Recognition, for excellence in filmmaking; 1997.
- American Choreography Awards: American Choreography Award Outstanding Achievement in Feature Film, Pablo Verón; 1998.

Nominations

- British Academy of Film and Television Arts: BAFTA Film Award; Best Film not in the English Language; 1998.
