= Christina Hendricks =

American actress (born 1975)

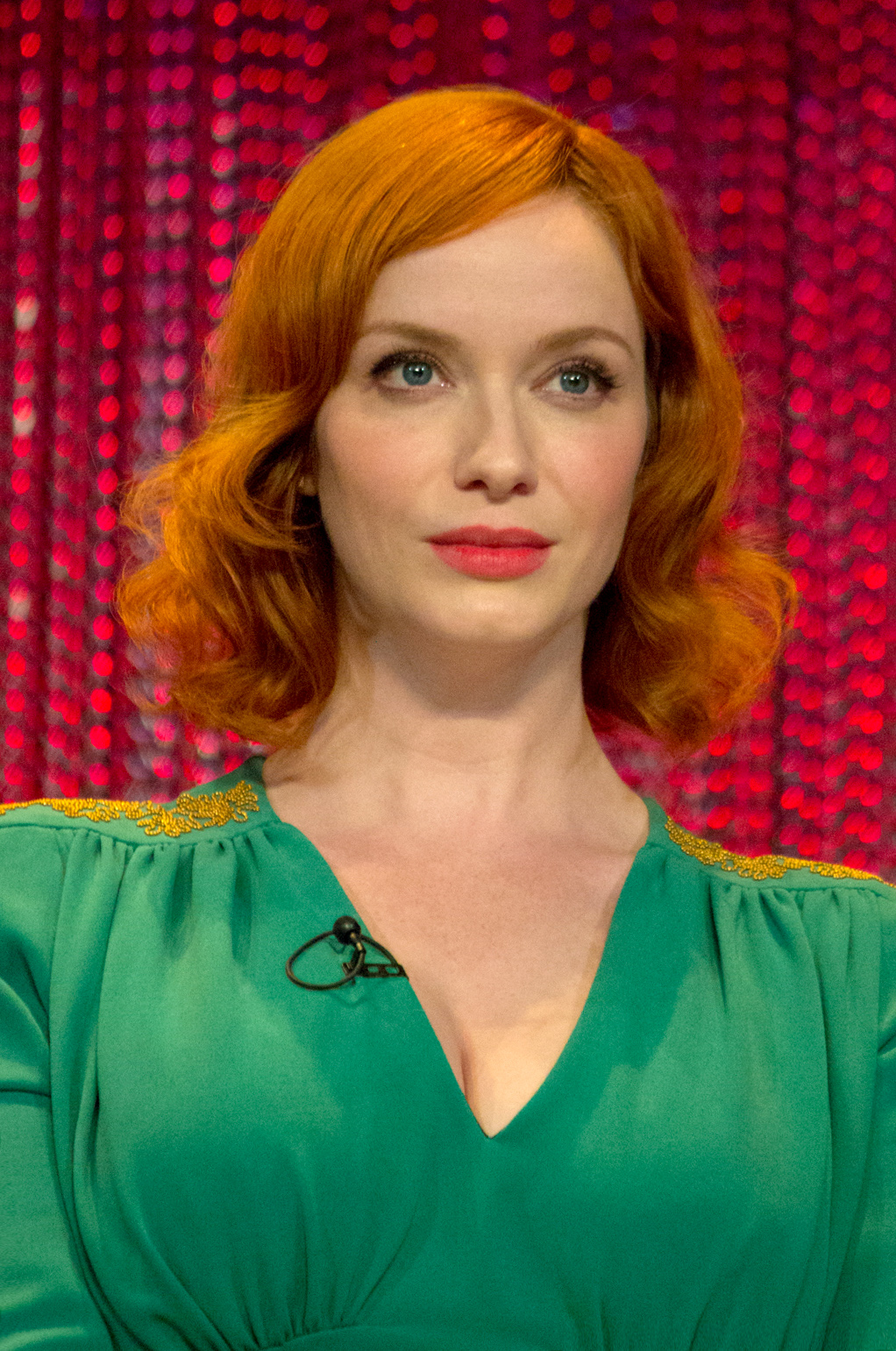
- Hendricks in 2014
- Born: Christina Rene Hendricks; May 3, 1975 (age 51); Knoxville, Tennessee, U.S.
- Citizenship: United States; United Kingdom
- Occupations: Actress; model
- Years active: 1994–present
- Works: Full list
- Height: 5 ft 8 in (1.73 m)
- Spouses: Geoffrey Arend (m. 2009; div. 2019) George Bianchini (m. 2024)
- Awards: Full list

Christina Rene Hendricks (born May 3, 1975) is an American actress and former model. She is best known for her role as Joan Holloway on the critically acclaimed AMC period drama series Mad Men (2007–2015). In 2010, a poll of female readers taken by Esquire magazine named her "the sexiest woman in the world". She was also voted "Best Looking Woman in America". Hendricks has received various accolades, including two Actor Awards and two Critics' Choice Awards, as well as nominations for six Primetime Emmy Awards.

Born to an American mother and English father in Knoxville, Tennessee, Hendricks was raised in Portland, Oregon, and Twin Falls, Idaho, where she became active in local theater. After completing high school in Virginia, she moved to New York City to pursue a modelling career, following her entry into a Seventeen cover contest. She continued to work internationally as a model for over a decade before transitioning into acting.

Hendricks had recurring roles on television series such as Beggars and Choosers (2001–2002) and Kevin Hill (2004–2005), before being cast as Joan Holloway on AMC's Mad Men in 2007, where she remained a regular cast member until the series' conclusion in 2015. She later starred on series such as Another Period (2015–2016), Hap and Leonard (2016), Tin Star (2017–2019), and NBC's Good Girls (2018–2021). Her film credits include Drive (2011), I Don't Know How She Does It (2011), Ginger & Rosa (2012), God's Pocket (2014), Lost River (2014), The Neon Demon (2016), Bad Santa 2 (2016), Fist Fight (2017), The Strangers: Prey at Night (2018), and Toy Story 4 (2019).

== Early life ==
Hendricks was born in Knoxville, Tennessee, the second child of American mother Jackie Sue Hendricks (née Raymond), a psychologist, and English father Robert Hendricks, a Forest Service employee originally from Birmingham. Through her father, she has dual British and American citizenship. She has one older brother. Her family relocated frequently due to her father's Forest Service job—first to Georgia when she was two months old, then to Portland, Oregon, where she attended elementary school.

When Hendricks was nine years old, the family moved from Portland to Twin Falls, Idaho, where she completed elementary and middle school. She described her family as "outdoorsy", relating that they frequently went on camping trips in the Pacific Northwest. Her mother encouraged her and her brother to join a local theater group in Twin Falls to make friends, and Hendricks appeared in a production there of Grease. She recalled, "I had all these amazing friends through the theatre company. And it was a community that really respected theatre. The kids would put on a play and the entire town would show. And you were cool if you were an actor." A natural blonde, Hendricks began coloring her hair red at age 10, inspired by the book Anne of Green Gables.

When Hendricks was a teenager, her father's job required the family to move near Washington, D.C. They settled in Fairfax, Virginia. She described the move from Idaho to Virginia as "traumatic" for her, and she was frequently bullied while attending Fairfax High School. Hendricks described herself as an "outcast" and a "goth" and found companionship in the school's drama department, where she appeared in plays. In addition to theater, she studied ballet throughout her teen years. She left Fairfax High School in her senior year and completed her studies at Northern Virginia Community College.

== Career ==
=== 1994–2006: Modeling career and early acting ===
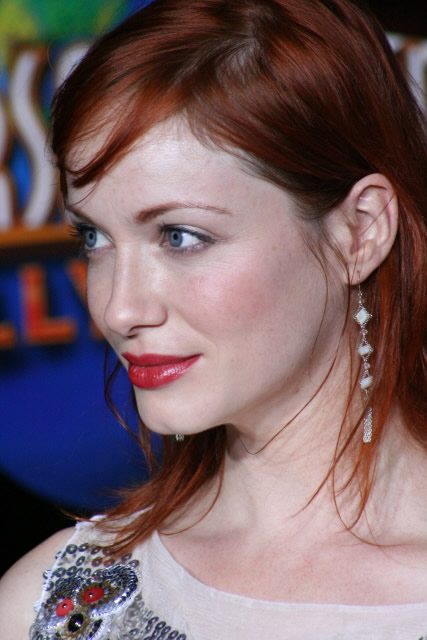
Hendricks in 2005

After high school, Hendricks worked as a receptionist and shampoo girl at a salon before entering a competition to appear on the cover of Seventeen magazine. This resulted in her signing with IMG Models, after which she moved to New York City at age 18, forgoing her pre-acceptance into Virginia Commonwealth University's drama school.

She began modeling in New York, London, and Japan between the ages of 18 and 27 before transitioning into commercials. She lived in London for around a year during this period, living with two friends who were teachers. In her early twenties, she moved with her mother and brother to Los Angeles, California. Initially, she pursued a career in the administrative sector of the music business, but was dissuaded by friends, and kept working as a model before auditioning for acting roles. She appeared in commercials for Carl's Jr. and Dr Pepper, and starred in the music video for Everclear's "One Hit Wonder" (1997). She was the hand model in the poster for the film American Beauty.

She made her television debut in the MTV anthology series Undressed. Her first starring role was as an intern on Beggars and Choosers, a Showtime comedy series about a group of young professionals that was filmed in Vancouver and ran from 1999 to 2001. She also had a guest role on the series Angel in 2000. She subsequently appeared in the television film The Big Time (2002), and had recurring guest roles on ER (2002), The Court (2003), and Firefly (2002–2003). After a guest appearance on Tru Calling, she was cast as Nicolette Ray in the UPN legal drama Kevin Hill, which aired during the 2004–05 television season.

=== 2007–2015: Mad Men and rise to prominence ===
In perhaps her best-known role to date, Hendricks played office manager Joan Holloway on the AMC series Mad Men, set in a series of fictitious advertising agencies in 1960s New York City. Her performance received critical praise, and earned her six Primetime Emmy nominations for Outstanding Supporting Actress in a Drama Series over the show's seven seasons.

Also in 2007, Hendricks made her feature film debut in La Cucina, a drama film that premiered on Showtime in December 2009, starring Hendricks as a writer. That year, she also starred in the thriller film South of Pico, and appeared in four episodes of the NBC series Life (2007–2008) in the recurring role of Olivia, detective Charlie Crews' soon-to-be stepmother and Ted Earley's love interest.

In 2010, she appeared in the musical video for "The Ghost Inside" on Broken Bells by Broken Bells.

She appeared in a supporting role in the action-thriller Drive (2011), directed by Nicolas Winding Refn. The following year, she was cast in a supporting role in Sally Potter's drama film Ginger & Rosa, playing the countercultural mother of a teenager growing up in the 1960s. In 2011, she appeared onstage in a production of Stephen Sondheim's Company at the Lincoln Center for the Performing Arts. She lent her voice and likeness in the 2011 racing video game Need for Speed: The Run, playing the role of Sam Harper.

In 2014, she played the lead character in Ryan Gosling's directorial debut Lost River, a fantasy film set in Detroit; it received mixed reviews. She voiced Zarina in Disney's The Pirate Fairy. She starred in the novel adaptation Dark Places (2015). After the conclusion of Mad Men in 2015, she starred as a prostitute in two seasons of the Comedy Central series Another Period (2015–2016), set in the early 20th century.

=== 2016–present: Good Girls and other roles ===
In 2016, she appeared as one of the leads in Refn's thriller film The Neon Demon, portraying a modeling agent. Critical response to the film was polarized, though the French film magazine Cahiers du cinéma named it the third-best film of 2016. The same year, she starred in six episodes of the series Hap and Leonard, playing the ex-wife of investigator Hap Collins.

In 2018, she appeared in home-invasion based horror film The Strangers: Prey at Night, playing the matriarch of a family under siege by killers. Upon release, the film received generally unfavorable reviews from critics, though The Guardian's Benjamin Lee praised Hendricks's performance. It was a commercial success, however, grossing $30 million.

In 2018, Hendricks returned to television in the Amazon Prime series The Romanoffs, reuniting with Mad Men creator Matthew Weiner. She stars as one of the leads on the NBC comedy crime series Good Girls, with her Tinker Bell co-star, Mae Whitman, playing a woman who attempts to gain financial control of her life by holding up a grocery store. The show ran until 2021. In late 2018, Hendricks starred opposite Sienna Miller in the drama American Woman, portraying a woman helping her sister raise her family in rural Pennsylvania. She also voiced Gabby Gabby, the main antivillain in the Disney/Pixar animated sequel Toy Story 4 (2019). In 2020, Hendricks voiced Officer Jaffe in the Warner Bros. 2020 Scooby-Doo film Scoob!.

In 2024, Hendricks guest starred on a Season 3 episode of Hacks, "Par for the Course." Hendricks' character, Gay Republican, meets Hannah Einbender's Ava at a golf tournament and the two have a romantic encounter gone wrong. Of working with Hendricks, Einbender said, "She is a national treasure, she's one of our finest actresses and it was really fun and really funny. Everything that I think we set out to do we did. That was such a gift and she's so cool."

== Personal life and public image ==
On October 11, 2009, Hendricks married actor Geoffrey Arend. Ten years later it was announced that they had separated, with a divorce finalized in December 2019. Since 2021, she has been in a relationship with camera operator George Bianchini. They announced their engagement in March 2023, and married on April 20, 2024.

Hendricks commented in September 2010 that the media is too focused on women's bodies and not their actual talents. "I was working my butt off on Mad Men and then all anyone was talking about was my body."

Hendricks picked up DJing as a hobby in late 2025; she played a "shoe pop dream gaze" set at Part Time Lover in San Diego in April 2026.

== Sources ==
- Maron, Marc; Hendricks, Christina (April 15, 2019). Episode 1010. WTF with Marc Maron.
