= Lansley =

Lansley is a surname. Notable people with the surname include:

- Alastair Lansley (born 1947), British architect
- Andrew Lansley (born 1956), British politician
- Diane Lansley (born 1953), English swimmer
- Jacky Lansley (born 20th century), British choreographer
- Oliver Lansley (born 1981), British actor and writer
