= Raymond Waring =

English actor

- Born: 21 July 1977 (age 48); Liverpool, Merseyside, England

Raymond Waring, known as Ray, (born 21 July 1977) is an English actor.

He was born in Liverpool and grew up in Runcorn, Cheshire, where he attended St. Chad's Secondary School. In 1994, he was accepted into the National Youth Theatre of Great Britain, and in 1997, he attended the Guildhall School of Music & Drama.

Raymond has appeared in numerous films, including Lucky Break, directed by Peter Cattaneo, as well as collaborating with Michael Winterbottom on 24 Hour Party People, A Cock and Bull Story and The Look of Love. He also appeared in Sally Potter's Yes. Additionally, he had roles in 28 Weeks Later and the horror thriller Intruders, both directed by Juan Carlos Fresnadillo.

In 2022, Waring appeared as Steve Hart in the Hillsborough disaster miniseries Anne, alongside Maxine Peake who played Anne.

== Filmography ==
Year	Title	Role	Notes
2001	Lucky Break	Darren	
2001	The Martins	Pet Shop Assistant	
2001	Tabloid	Reveller	
2002	24 Hour Party People	Vini	
2002	Heartlands	Forest Man	
2003	Cheeky	Norman Grundy	
2004	Yes	Whizzer	
2004	Finding Neverland	Stage Worker	
2005	A Cock and Bull Story	Trim	
2007	28 Weeks Later	Sam	
2009	White Lightnin'	Davey	
2009	Shadows in the Sun	Adrian / 'Caliban'	
2011	Intruders	Policeman #2	
2013	The Look of Love	Reporter No. 1	
2014	Serena	Ticket master	
2016	The Head Hunter	Raymond	
2018	The Sisters Brothers	Mayfield Bartender	
2021	No Time to Die	Spectre Agent #8	
2022	Anne	Steve Hart	
