= List of awards and nominations received by Christina Hendricks =

Christina Hendricks awards and nominations
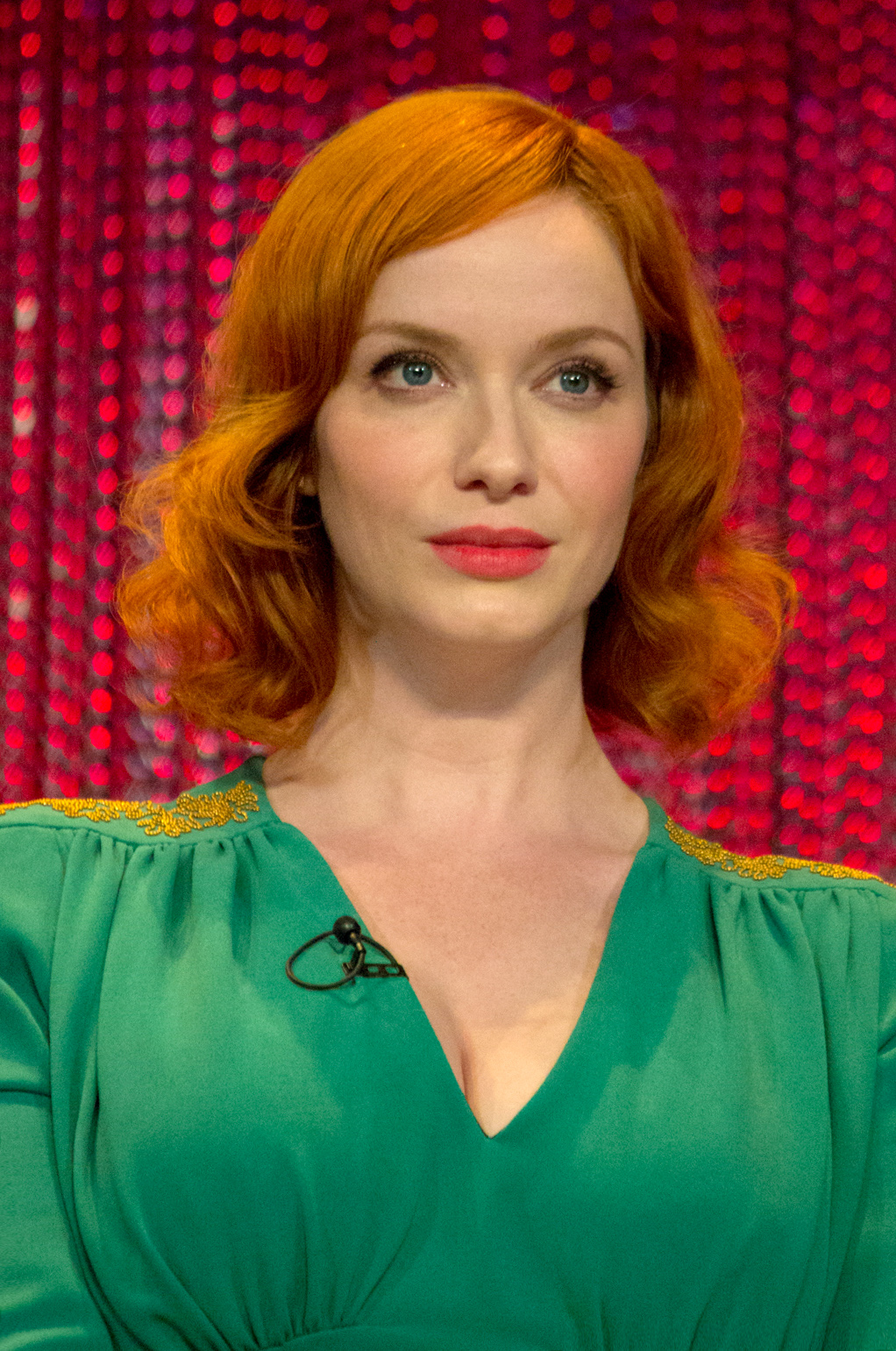
- Hendricks in 2014
Awards and nominations
Award	Wins	Nominations
Critics' Choice Television Awards	2	2
Golden Nymph Awards	1	2
Primetime Emmy Awards	0	6
Satellite Awards	0	1
Screen Actors Guild Awards	2	5
SyFy Genre Awards	1	1
TV Guide Awards	0	1
Women Film Critics Circle	1	1

Totals (Note: Certain award groups do not simply award one winner. They acknowledge several different recipients, have runners-up, and have third place. Since this is a specific recognition and is different from losing an award, runner-up mentions are considered wins in this award tally. For simplification and to avoid errors, each award in this list has been presumed to have had a prior nomination.)
- Wins: 7
- Nominations: 19

Christina Hendricks is an American actress whose accolades include six Primetime Emmy Award nominations, two Screen Actors Guild Awards, three Screen Actors Guild Award nominations, and two Critics' Choice Television Awards.

After appearing in several television series in the early 2000s, Hendricks had her breakthrough portraying Joan Holloway on the AMC series Mad Men, of which she remained a main cast member from its 2007 debut to its 2015 conclusion. During her tenure on the series, Hendricks was nominated for a Primetime Emmy Award for Outstanding Supporting Actress in a Drama Series six times. She also won two Screen Actors Guild Awards for Outstanding Performance by an Ensemble in a Drama Series, as well as an additional three nominations.

Additionally, Hendricks was nominated for two Golden Nymph Awards for her performance on Mad Men (one of which was a win). In 2018, she was nominated for a Satellite Award for her performance on the comedy series Good Girls.

== Major associations ==
=== Actor Awards ===
The Actor Awards (formerly Screen Actors Guild Awards) are organized by the SAG-AFTRA. First awarded in 1995, the awards aim to recognize excellent achievements in film and television.

Year	Category	Nominated work	Result	Ref.
2007	Outstanding Ensemble in a Drama Series	Mad Men (season 1)	Won	
2008	Outstanding Ensemble in a Drama Series	Mad Men (season 2)	Won	
2009	Outstanding Ensemble in a Drama Series	Mad Men (season 3)	Nominated	
2010	Outstanding Ensemble in a Drama Series	Mad Men (season 4)	Nominated	
2012	Outstanding Ensemble in a Drama Series	Mad Men (season 5)	Nominated	
2015	Outstanding Ensemble in a Drama Series	Mad Men (season 7)	Nominated	

=== Primetime Emmy Awards ===
The Primetime Emmy Awards are bestowed by the Academy of Television Arts & Sciences (ATAS) in recognition of excellence in American primetime television programming.

Year	Category	Nominated work	Result	Ref.
2010	Outstanding Supporting Actress in a Drama Series	Mad Men (episode: "Guy Walks Into an Advertising Agency")	Nominated	
2011	Outstanding Supporting Actress in a Drama Series	Mad Men (episode: "The Summer Man")	Nominated	
2012	Outstanding Supporting Actress in a Drama Series	Mad Men (episode: "The Other Woman")	Nominated	
2013	Outstanding Supporting Actress in a Drama Series	Mad Men (episode: "A Tale of Two Cities")	Nominated	
2014	Outstanding Supporting Actress in a Drama Series	Mad Men (episode: "The Strategy")	Nominated	
2015	Outstanding Supporting Actress in a Drama Series	Mad Men (episode: "Lost Horizon")	Nominated	

== Miscellaneous awards ==
=== Critics' Choice Television Awards ===
The Critics' Choice Television Awards are presented annually since 2011 by the Broadcast Television Journalists Association. The awards were launched "to enhance access for broadcast journalists covering the television industry".

Year	Category	Nominated work	Result	Ref.
2011	Best Supporting Actress in a Drama Series	Mad Men	Won (Note: Tied with Margo Martindale.)	
2012	Best Supporting Actress in a Drama Series	Mad Men	Won	

=== Golden Nymph Awards ===
The Golden Nymph Awards are presented annually by the Monte-Carlo Television Festival, and are among the "most prestigious prizes in international television, rewarding the best TV programs and actors".

Year	Category	Nominated work	Result	Ref.
2009	Outstanding Actress in a Drama TV Series	Mad Men	Won	
2011	Outstanding Actress in a Drama TV Series	Mad Men	Nominated	

=== Satellite Awards ===
The Satellite Awards are a set of annual awards given by the International Press Academy.

Year	Category	Nominated work	Result	Ref.
2019	Best Actress in a Comedy or Musical Series	Good Girls	Nominated	

=== SyFy Genre Awards ===
The SyFy Genre Awards are presented annually by the SyFy channel, honoring film and television in the genre of science fiction.

Year	Category	Nominated work	Result	Ref.
2006	Best Special Guest/Television	Firefly	Won	

=== TV Guide Awards ===
The TV Guide Awards are announced annually by TV Guide, based on readers' votes for their favorite performers in television.

Year	Category	Nominated work	Result	Ref.
2013	Favorite Actress	Mad Men	Nominated	

=== Women Film Critics Circle ===
The Women Film Critics Circle is an association of 75 women film critics and scholars from around the country and internationally, who honor annual achievements by women film-makers.

Year	Category	Nominated work	Result	Ref.
2013	Women's Work / Best Ensemble	Ginger & Rosa	Won	
