= Yes (2004 film) =

- Film poster
- Directed by: Sally Potter
- Written by: Sally Potter
- Produced by: Christopher Sheppard
- Starring: Joan Allen; Simon Abkarian; Sam Neill; Gary Lewis
- Cinematography: Aleksei Rodionov
- Edited by: Daniel Goddard
- Music by: Philip Glass (song); Tom Waits (song); Sally Potter
- Distributed by: Sony Pictures Classics
- Release date: September 4, 2004 (Telluride Film Festival)
- Running time: 100 min
- Countries: United Kingdom; United States
- Language: English
- Budget: £1,000,000 (estimated)

Yes is a 2004 romantic drama film written and directed by Sally Potter and starring Joan Allen, Simon Abkarian, Samantha Bond, Sam Neill, Shirley Henderson, Raymond Waring, Stephanie Leonidas, and Sheila Hancock.

The film's dialogue is almost entirely in iambic pentameter and usually rhymes. This artistic choice polarised film critics.

== Plot ==
The film opens as an unnamed Irish-American microbiologist (Allen) discovers her English businessman husband Anthony (Neill) is having an affair with their goddaughter's mother. Feeling fragile and alone at an elegant London dinner party, she meets a Lebanese Muslim chef (Abkarian) who immediately begins seducing her. They soon begin a passionate, torrid affair. He tells her of his past in Beirut, where he was a surgeon who became disillusioned after he saved a man's life moments before he was shot dead. She tells him about her childhood, which began in Belfast where she was raised by a loving Marxist aunt before she moved to America.

After a racially driven argument in his restaurant's kitchen, the chef is fired. His connection with the microbiologist begins to implode as he questions the foundation for their relationship and cultural attitudes begin to pull them apart. "From Elvis to Eminem, Warhol's art," he says, "I know your stories, know your songs by heart. But do you know mine? No, every time, I make the effort, and I learn to rhyme, in your English. And do you know a word of my language, even one? Have you heard that 'algebra' was an Arabic man? You've read the Bible. Have you read the Koran?"

She is called away suddenly to Belfast when her aunt (Hancock) is hospitalized. After the old woman dies, the microbiologist telephones the chef and invites him to travel with her to Cuba, to make the journey her aunt always wanted to make but never did. He, however, has returned to Beirut. She travels alone to Havana where she undergoes an emotional and physical renewal. When she prays to God for some kind of sign that life has meaning, she is interrupted by news that a man is there to see her; it is her lover, the chef, who has suddenly arrived in Cuba to be with her.

The film is punctuated throughout by commentaries and glances from various cleaners and maids who act as a sort of Greek chorus as they look and speak directly to the camera, most notably the microbiologist's housecleaner (Henderson), who offers various metaphorical commentary about dirt, germs, and cleanliness and how much they are like the larger world.

== Cast ==
- Joan Allen as She
- Simon Abkarian as He
- Sam Neill as Anthony
- Gary Lewis as Billy
- Wil Johnson as Virgil
- Gary Lewis as Billy
- Raymond Waring as Whizzer
- Stephanie Leonidas as Grace
- Barbara Oxley as Cleaner in Swimming Pool
- Samantha Bond as Kate
- Kev Orkian as Waiter
- George Antoni as Kitchen Boss
- Beryl Scott as Cleaner in Laboratory
- Sheila Hancock as Aunt
- Lol Coxhill as Father Christmas
- Charles Owen as Priest
- Mandy Coombes as Nun
- Beti Owen as Nun
- Dot Bond as Cleaner in Nursing Home
- Dorca Reyes Sanchez as Woman in Cuban Apartment
- Antoine Agoudjian and Christina Galstian as Friends in Beirut

== Reception ==
Yes divided critics upon its release. On the review aggregator website Rotten Tomatoes, 53% of 87 critics' reviews are positive, with an average rating of 6.1/10. The website's consensus reads: "Emotional performances/ Can't stop the curse/ Of ever-present pretensions/ Writ in heavy-handed verse." Metacritic, which uses a weighted average, assigned the film a score of 55 out of 100, based on 29 critics, indicating "mixed or average" reviews. Roger Ebert assigned the film a full four stars; writing that "Potter's sin has been to make a movie that is artistically mannered and overtly political", he said that "what the dialogue brings to the film is a certain unstated gravity; it elevates what is being said into a realm of grace and care." Jonathan Rosenbaum also gave the work his highest rating, lauding it as "beautifully composed and deftly delivered". Desson Thomson of The Washington Post wrote, "For those who accept Potter's premise -- and why not embark on a challenging, enriching experience? -- this is a unique, bold adventure of the soul."

Conversely, A. O. Scott of The New York Times, while admitting that "there is no denying Ms. Potter's skill at versifying -- or for that matter, at composing clear, striking visual images", disparaged her lines as doggerel and concluded that "her formal ingenuity [...] is yoked to ideas of almost staggering banality". Ann Hornaday of The Washington Post was also unfavorable, calling it "sporadically beautiful" but also "belabored and, ultimately, inert. It's a bold exercise, an interesting experiment, but a movie it ain't."

== Awards ==
- 2005 Brisbane International Film Festival: Interfaith Award for Promoting Humanitarian Values - Special Commendation
- 2005 Seattle International Film Festival: Best Actress (Joan Allen)
