= The Party (2017 film) =

2017 film

- Theatrical release poster
- Directed by: Sally Potter
- Written by: Sally Potter
- Produced by: Kurban Kassam; Christopher Sheppard
- Starring: Patricia Clarkson; Bruno Ganz; Cherry Jones; Emily Mortimer; Cillian Murphy; Kristin Scott Thomas; Timothy Spall
- Cinematography: Aleksei Rodionov
- Edited by: Emilie Orsini; Anders Refn
- Production companies: Adventure Pictures; Great Point Media
- Distributed by: Picturehouse Entertainment
- Release dates: 13 February 2017 (Berlin); 13 October 2017 (UK)
- Running time: 71 minutes
- Country: United Kingdom
- Language: English
- Box office: $6 million

The Party is a 2017 British black comedy film written and directed by Sally Potter. The film was released in black and white and features a seven-actor ensemble of Patricia Clarkson, Bruno Ganz, Cherry Jones, Emily Mortimer, Cillian Murphy, Kristin Scott Thomas and Timothy Spall.

It was selected to compete for the Golden Bear in the main competition section of the 67th Berlin International Film Festival and was awarded the Guild Film Prize. The film received positive reviews from critics.

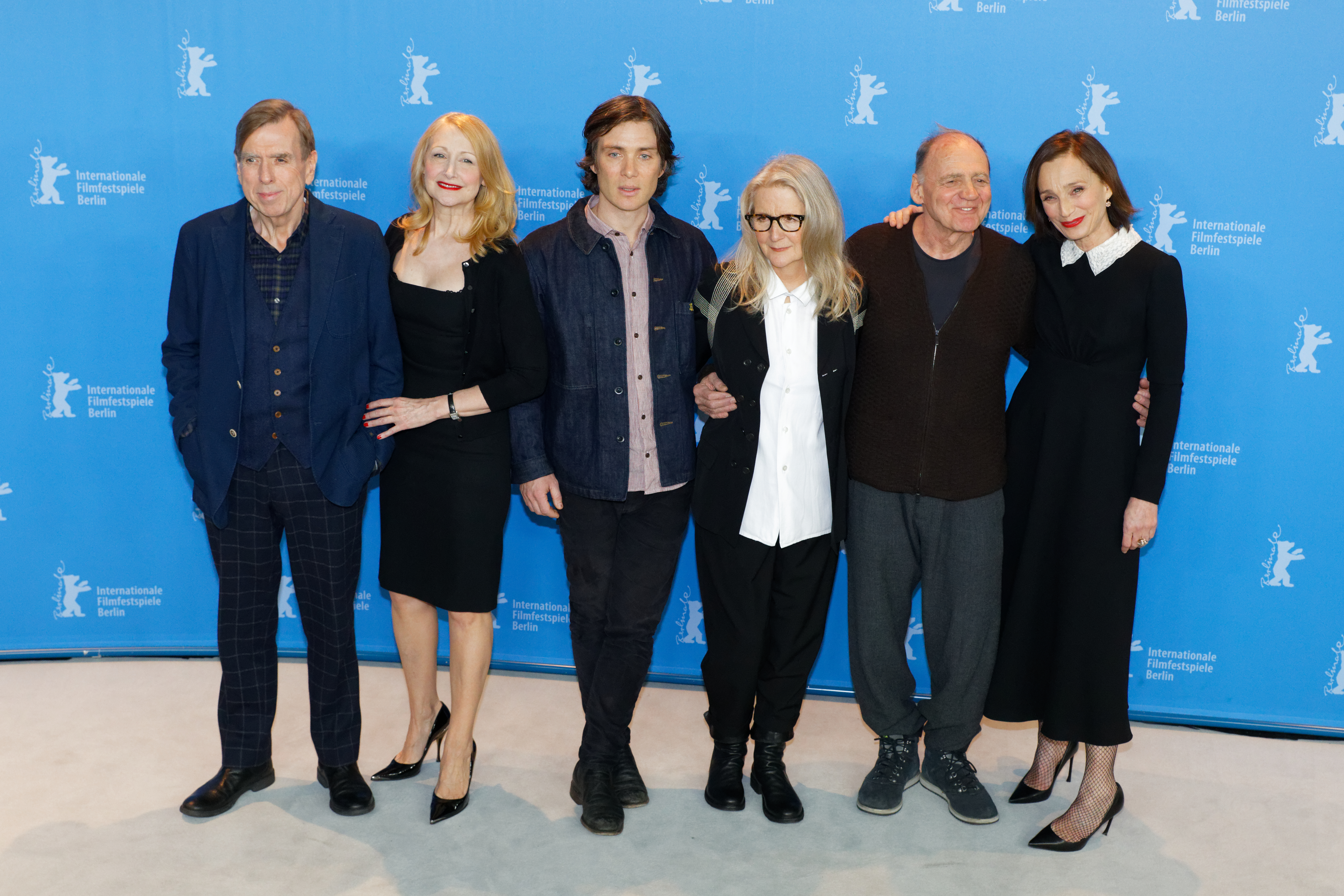
67th Berlin International Film Festival, 2017, Sally Potter with the cast : Timothy Spall, Patricia Clarkson, Cillian Murphy, Sally Potter, Bruno Ganz, and Kristin Scott Thomas

== Plot ==
Janet, a prominent British politician in the Parliamentary opposition party, has just been announced as shadow minister for health. She has invited her friends to a small celebration at her house, including April, April's estranged German partner Gottfried who is a life coach and self-proclaimed spiritual healer, women's studies professor Martha and her partner Jinny who is a renowned chef, and Janet's colleague and subordinate Marianne with husband Tom, a handsome younger banker.

Janet's husband Bill slumps in his chair listening to jazz, staring vacantly, and heavily drinking as the guests arrive. Marianne fails to arrive, and Tom explains she'll be late. Tom, visibly agitated, locks himself in the bathroom, where he snorts cocaine and brandishes a handgun in the bathroom mirror. Janet meanwhile has been discretely exchanging phone calls and text messages with an unknown lover.

April, continually belitting Gottfried, proposes a toast to Janet on her appointment. Martha and Jinny announce that Jinny is pregnant with triplets via in vitro fertilisation. The celebratory mood vanishes when Bill announces he is terminally ill with advanced cancer. Gottfried tells him to look past Western medicine and explore his spiritual capacities for a chance of an extended life. Bill is a well-known atheist intellectual but listens to Gottfried's spiritual pep talk without argument. When Janet announces she'll resign from the shadow cabinet to give end of life care to Bill, he announces he's leaving her to spend his final days with Marianne. Tom, aware of Bill's plan, berates him in front of the others, and runs outside to throw Bill's gun into the trash.

Martha patronizes Jinny as they talk about their future as parents, and Jinny threatens to leave her. Martha pleads with Jinny to stay with her to help with the three children. Janet, distracted by the drama, burns the canapes and throws the smoking vol-au-vents into the trash where she finds the gun. She brings it inside and conceals it in the bathroom. April joins her to discuss the evenings events in private, and April confesses she is proud of Janet's accomplishments.

Gottfried counsels Tom and Bill but emotions escalate when Bill, very drunk, rambles about the love he shares with Marianne and Tom punches him unconscious. Gottfried and Tom try to resuscitate him. As Janet is about to confess a secret to April, she's retrieved from the locked bathroom to help with Bill. When she succeeds in reviving him, he looks her in the eyes and asks "How did it come to this?"

The doorbell rings, presumably by Marianne. Janet retrieves the gun, opens the door, aims at the unseen visitor and exclaims "You told me you loved me. ME! You traitor!" as the screen cuts to black.

== Cast ==
- Patricia Clarkson as April, Janet's best friend, a cynic and realist
- Bruno Ganz as Gottfried, April's estranged boyfriend, a pseudo-scientific healer
- Cherry Jones as Martha, Janet's friend, a women's studies professor
- Emily Mortimer as Jinny, Martha's pregnant partner, a famous chef
- Cillian Murphy as Tom, "in finance", the husband of Marianne, Janet's subordinate
- Kristin Scott Thomas as Janet, an idealistic politician
- Timothy Spall as Bill, Janet's husband, a materialist and atheist professor

== Release ==
In February 2017, The Party competed at Berlin International Film Festival.

In May 2017, Picturehouse Entertainment and Roadside Attractions acquired UK and U.S. distribution rights to the film respectively. The film was released in the UK on 13 October 2017. In the US, the film was given a limited release on February 16, 2018.

=== Critical reception ===
The Party received positive reviews from film critics. It holds a critical approval rating of 81% on review aggregator website Rotten Tomatoes, based on 150 reviews, with an average rating of 6.96/10. The website's critical consensus reads, "Old-fashioned charm meets sharp wit and modern social satire in The Party, a biting comedy carried by a shining performance from Patricia Clarkson." On Metacritic, the film holds a rating of 73 out of 100, based on 31 critics, indicating "generally favorable reviews". Peter Bradshaw of The Guardian described the film as 'observant and smart' in his review.

=== Awards and nominations ===
The Party was awarded the Guild Film Prize at the 2017 Berlin International Film Festival.
