= The Roads Not Taken =

2020 film directed by Sally Potter

- Theatrical release poster
- Directed by: Sally Potter
- Written by: Sally Potter
- Produced by: Christopher Sheppard
- Starring: Javier Bardem; Elle Fanning; Laura Linney; Salma Hayek
- Cinematography: Robbie Ryan
- Edited by: Sally Potter; Jason Rayton; Emilie Orsini
- Music by: Sally Potter
- Production companies: BBC Films; HanWay Films; BFI; Ingenious Media; Chimney Pot; Sverige AB; Adventure Pictures; Film i Väst; Washington Square Films
- Distributed by: Bleecker Street (United States); Focus Features Universal Pictures (Select territories)
- Release dates: 26 February 2020 (Berlinale); 13 March 2020 (United States); 11 September 2020 (United Kingdom)
- Running time: 85 minutes
- Countries: United States; United Kingdom; Sweden
- Language: English
- Box office: $105,439

The Roads Not Taken is a 2020 drama film written and directed by Sally Potter. The film stars Javier Bardem, Elle Fanning, Salma Hayek and Laura Linney.

The Roads Not Taken had its world premiere at the Berlin International Film Festival on February 26, 2020, and was released on March 13, 2020, by Bleecker Street.

== Plot ==
=== New York City ===
Leo lies in bed, oblivious to the phone ringing and the doorbell buzzing. His daughter, Molly, enters and asks why he isn't answering. Leo mutters to himself as his caretaker, Xenia, vacuums. Due to his dementia, he struggles to focus on preparing for his medical appointments.

Leo and Molly make it into a taxi. At his appointment, he fails to comply with the dentist's instructions and is incontinent. Molly gets her father changed and into another taxi but Leo stumble out the passenger door and hits his head. Leo is taken to the emergency room in an ambulance. Molly's mother, Rita, chastises her ex-husband for his behavior. Molly argues with Rita and Leo's attending doctor while Leo fixates on his dead dog, Néstor.

After discharge, Molly takes Leo to Costco, and he disappears when she takes an important phone call from her boss. She finds a sobbing Leo tightly clutching a dog he believes is Néstor. The dog's owner accuses him of trying to steal her dog and she makes racially charged insults as security tackles him. The guards let Leo go after Molly explains his medical condition.

Molly takes Leo to the optometrist, where he again fails to follow instructions. Outside, Molly receives a call from her boss stating that her project has been given to someone else. She tells her father that she cannot go on pretending anymore. Later that night, Leo walks out of his apartment and roams the streets barefoot as Molly frantically searches for him. He is eventually rescued by two taxi drivers.

=== Mexico ===
Leo's wife, Dolores, pleads with him to get out of bed and get ready. In the kitchen, he finds her preparing a bag filled with arranged flowers before driving off in their truck. Leo chases after her. In the car, he bickers with Dolores over what road to take, leading him to exit the vehicle in a state of delirium. Dolores drives off, leaving Leo on the desert road. He hitchhikes into town on the back of a maize truck.

That night, Leo comes across a Day of the Dead celebration at the local cemetery. Dolores guides him to the grave of their deceased son, Néstor, where Leo breaks down and blames himself for his death. Dolores and Leo tearfully embrace, reflecting on their sadness and desire to have their son back.

=== Greece ===
Leo sits by the sea at a tavern run by his friend Mikael, and he converses with a German tourist, Anni, who reminds him of his daughter. They discuss Leo's unfinished novel about a man who must choose between returning home, or continuing his journey in exile. Throughout the day, a frenzied Leo seeks out her opinion on his work, much to the annoyance of Anni's friends. Leo is asked if he's truly comfortable with giving up his family in order to write, but he can't find an answer.

Anni and her friends board a night-time party cruise and Leo secretly follows with his rowboat into the open sea. Leo tires himself out but is unable to keep up to the ship and a group of fishermen find Leo dead in his rowboat the next morning.

=== New York City ===
Leo is delivered to Molly by the police, who takes him back to his apartment. He begins to recount the stories he believes are running parallel to his own life, including his marriage in Mexico as a young man and his unexpected death in Greece. Molly tells him he was once married to a woman named Dolores before he emigrated to the United States and that he had run off to Greece when Molly was born, but returned after realizing his mistake. Molly sits by his bed and promises to stay by his side; meanwhile, a parallel version of Molly packs her things and walks out of Leo's apartment.

== Cast ==
- Javier Bardem as Leo
- Elle Fanning as Molly
- Salma Hayek as Dolores
- Laura Linney as Rita
- Branka Katić as Xenia
- Milena Tscharntke as Anni
- Dimitri Andreas as Mikael
- Gerard Cordero as Police Officer Amenta

== Production ==
In December 2018, it was announced Javier Bardem, Elle Fanning, Salma Hayek, Laura Linney and Chris Rock had joined the cast of the film, with Sally Potter directing and writing the screenplay. Christopher Sheppard would serve as producer under his Adventure Pictures banner, while BBC Films, HanWay Films, British Film Institute, Ingenious Media, Chimney Pot, Sverige AB, Adventure Pictures and Film i Väst would also produce the film. The film was also produced in association with Washington Square Films. Bleecker Street would serve as the main distributor for the film. Production began that same month. During post-production, Rock's scenes were entirely cut from the film.

The film is dedicated to Nic Potter, Sally's brother, who suffered from Pick's Disease, a type of dementia.

== Release ==
In September 2019, it was announced Focus Features had acquired select international distribution rights including the U.K., France, Germany, Italy, Australia and New Zealand from HanWay Films. It had its world premiere at the Berlin International Film Festival on February 26, 2020. It was released in the United States on March 13, 2020. However, due to the COVID-19 pandemic, Bleecker Street partnered with distributors to virtually stream the film on participating theater websites splitting the revenue beginning April 10, 2020.

== Reception ==
On Rotten Tomatoes, the film holds an approval rating of 43% based on 47 reviews, with an average rating of 5.1/10. The site's critical consensus reads: "The Roads Not Taken is the well-acted result of an undeniably singular vision – one which is ultimately frustratingly, fatally inert." On Metacritic, the film has a weighted average score of 42 out of 100, based on 19 critic reviews, indicating "mixed or average reviews".

Writing for RogerEbert.com, Tomris Laffly gave the film 2 out of 4 stars, writing that "[throughout] these meaty and competing narratives, Bardem believably slips in and out of his three characters with nuance. Yet somehow, Potter can’t seem to connect the dots between these evocative yet clumsily edited viewpoints."
