= Intruders (2011 film) =

- Spanish theatrical release poster
- Directed by: Juan Carlos Fresnadillo
- Written by: Nicolás Casariego; Jaime Marques
- Produced by: Enrique López Lavigne; Belén Atienza; Mercedes Gamero
- Starring: Clive Owen; Carice van Houten; Daniel Brühl; Pilar López de Ayala; Ella Purnell; Izan Corchero; Kerry Fox; Héctor Alterio
- Cinematography: Enrique Chediak
- Edited by: Chris Gill
- Music by: Roque Baños
- Production companies: Apaches Entertainment; Antena 3 Films
- Distributed by: Millennium Entertainment (United States); Universal Pictures International (International)
- Release dates: 12 September 2011 (TIFF); 7 October 2011 (Spain); 27 January 2012 (United Kingdom); 30 March 2012 (United States)
- Running time: 100 minutes
- Countries: Spain; United Kingdom; United States
- Languages: English; Spanish
- Budget: $12 million (est.)
- Box office: $5.4 million

Intruders is a 2011 supernatural horror film directed by Juan Carlos Fresnadillo and written by the Spanish duo Nicolás Casariego and Jaime Marques. The film stars Clive Owen, Carice van Houten, Daniel Brühl, Pilar López de Ayala, Ella Purnell, Izan Corchero, Kerry Fox and Héctor Alterio. The film follows a man and a woman trying to save their children's lives from an imaginary monster, known as Hollow Face, trying to take their faces and souls.

Intruders was released in Spain on 7 October 2011 by Universal Pictures International and in the United Kingdom on 27 January 2012 by Universal Pictures. The film grossed $5 million worldwide and received mixed-to-negative reviews from critics, who praised its performances, atmosphere, and the first act, but criticized its bland plot, use of jump scares, and the film's villain.

== Plot ==
Though no one can see him, Hollow Face lurks in the corners, desperately desiring love but only knowing how to spread fear and hate. In England, Hollow Face creeps into the life of John Farrow, after Farrow's 12-year-old daughter Mia is assaulted in their home. In Spain, Hollow Face creeps into the life of Luisa and her adolescent son Juan, after Juan is assaulted in their home. The line between the real and the imaginary blurs as fissures open within the family unit. It seems that no security measure can keep out Hollow Face.

== Cast ==
- Clive Owen as John Farrow
- Carice van Houten as Susanna
- Ella Purnell as Mia Farrow
- Pilar López de Ayala as Luisa
- Izan Corchero as Juan
- Daniel Brühl as Father Antonio
- Mark Wingett as Grandfather
- Lolita Chakrabarti as Dr. Roy
- Kerry Fox as Dr. Rachel
- Raymond Waring and Adam Leese as Policemen

== Production ==
The film stars Clive Owen, Kerry Fox, Carice van Houten and Daniel Brühl. The shooting began in late June 2010, in London, Madrid and Segovia, under the directorial guidance of Juan Carlos Fresnadillo. The screenplay was written by the Spanish duo Nicolás Casariego and Jaime Marques, based on a story by Juan Carlos Fresnadillo. Belén Atienza and Enrique López Lavigne works as producer for Antena 3 Films, Apaches Entertainment and Universal Pictures.

== Release ==
Intruders was released in Spain on 7 October 2011 by Universal Pictures International and in the United Kingdom on 27 January 2012 by Universal Pictures. In the United States, the film received a limited release on 30 March 2012 by Millennium Entertainment.

== Reception ==
Critical reception for Intruders the film has been mostly negative. Film review aggregator Rotten Tomatoes reported an approval rating of 32%, based on 72 reviews, with an average rating of 4.86/10. The website's critical consensus reads, "Intruders has a fantastic first act but then settles into a bland plot and scare tactics that aren't all too scary." On Metacritic, the film has a weighted average score of 45 out of 100, based on 21 critics, indicating "mixed or average" reviews.

Sean Burns from Philadelphia Weekly gave the film a negative review, criticising the film's climax, special effects, "disparate" storyline, and slow pacing. Burns also criticised the film's monster as being "not-particularly-frightening".
