= Lucky Break (2001 film) =

2001 film by Peter Cattaneo

- U.K. theatrical release poster
- Directed by: Peter Cattaneo
- Written by: Ronan Bennett (screenplay); Stephen Fry (lyrics)
- Produced by: Peter Cattaneo; Barnaby Thompson
- Starring: James Nesbitt; Olivia Williams; Timothy Spall; Bill Nighy; Lennie James; Christopher Plummer
- Cinematography: Alwin H. Küchler
- Edited by: David Gamble
- Music by: Anne Dudley
- Production companies: Paramount Pictures; Miramax Films; FilmFour Productions; Senator Film; Fragile Films; Lucky Break Productions Ltd.
- Distributed by: FilmFour Distributors (United Kingdom); Senator Filmverleih (Germany); Paramount Pictures (United States and Canada)
- Release dates: 24 August 2001 (UK); 8 November 2001 (Germany); 5 April 2002 (United States)
- Running time: 108 minutes
- Countries: United Kingdom; Germany; United States
- Language: English

Lucky Break is a 2001 crime comedy film starring James Nesbitt and directed by Peter Cattaneo.

The film is a co-production between the United Kingdom, Germany and the United States.

== Plot ==
James 'Jimmy' Hands and Rudy 'Rud' Guscott are two friends who used to play "Cops & Robbers" when they were young. Now adults, they plan to actually rob a bank, but the robbery goes wrong and Hands flees the bank leaving Guscott trapped behind the security shutters. Hands is caught and arrested not long later.

After being sentenced to do time in prison, Hands and Guscott make a daring escape plan as the prison is scheduled to put on a theatrical show of Nelson: The Musical. During rehearsals, the inmates are unable to find a pianist for the show, until one inmate, Cliff Gumbell (Timothy Spall) volunteers and impresses them with his amazing piano skills. Hands is cast as Nelson (against his will) and Guscott is cast as Hardy, much to Guscott's dismay as his character kisses Nelson as he dies.

The escape plan proves difficult to proceed with, as one of the guards becomes very suspicious of Hands. Further complications arise when one of the more dangerous inmates threatens Hands to help him escape, as well as Hands warming to a prison employee named Annabel. During a prison visiting day, Gumbell is devastated to learn that his son is spending more time with his uncle, and that his wife is very disappointed being married to a criminal. Unable to live with the shame, Gumbell commits suicide in his cell.

The night of the show arrives and the escape plan is put into action. However, the dangerous inmate is tricked into going over the 30-foot prison wall and falls down the other side, where he is captured. Hands and Guscott are about to escape when Hands reveals his intentions to stay because of his feelings for Annabel. Guscott reluctantly lets Hands go and escapes with two other inmates, one of whom has a friend who arrives in a plane to help them escape.

Back in the prison, one of the guards resigns from his job over frustration of the inmates escaping and becomes a car park warden. Hands is later released from prison and starts a new life with Annabel.

== Cast list ==
- James Nesbitt as James 'Jimmy' Hands / Lord Nelson in Show
- Olivia Williams as Annabel Sweep / Lady Hamilton in Show
- Timothy Spall as Cliff Gumbell
- Bill Nighy as Roger 'Rog' Chamberlain / King George III in Show
- Lennie James as Rudy 'Rud' Guscott / Hardy in Show
- Ron Cook as Mr. Perry, the Guard
- Frank Harper as John Toombes
- Raymond Waring as Darren
- Christopher Plummer as Graham Mortimer
- Julian Barratt as Paul Dean
- Peter Wight as Officer George Beorge Barratt
- Celia Imrie as Amy Chamberlain
- Peter McNamara as Ward
- Andy Linden as Kenny
- Ram John Holder as Old Billy Morris

== Production ==
Lucky Break was the second feature film directed by Peter Cattaneo, following his 1997 comedy, The Full Monty. The film screened at both Edinburgh Film Festival and the Venice Film Festival prior to its UK theatrical release.

Anne Dudley collaborated with Stephen Fry to write and produce songs for the send-up musical "Nelson." Exterior prison scenes were filmed at Dartmoor Prison, Princetown.

== Reception ==
The film holds a 48% rating on Rotten Tomatoes based on 44 reviews with the critics consensus: "Lucky Break fails to do anything new with The Full Monty formula". On Metacritic, it holds a Metascore of 48 based on 22 reviews, indicating "Mixed or average reviews".

Dave Kehr of The New York Times said that "Mr. Cattaneo restricts himself to the smiling blandness that has become the stock in trade of British comedies made for export, turning in a film that is forced, familiar and thoroughly condescending".

Michael O'Sullivan of The Washington Post wrote "Apart from the deja vu all over again, Lucky Break is no worse a film than Breaking Out, and [that film] was utterly charming".

According to Derek Elley of Variety, the film is "[c]hained to the floor by a script that isn't particularly funny, direction that goes for realism rather than stylization and an almost complete lack of comic timing".
