= Rose English =

British artist

Rose English is a British artist working in performance, installation, theatre, dance and film. She studied Fine Art at Leeds Polytechnic (now Leeds Beckett University) graduating in 1973 with the performance installation 'A Divertissement' as her degree show. She has been writing, directing and performing her own work for over thirty five years in venues as various as Tate Britain; Royal Court Theatre; Queen Elizabeth Hall; the Adelaide Festival; and Lincoln Center, New York. Her productions feature a diversity of co-performers including musicians, dancers, circus performers, magicians and horses.

Her shows range from her site-specific performances and collaborations of the 1970s including Quadrille, Berlin and Mounting, her acclaimed solos of the 1980s including Plato's Chair and The Beloved to her large scale spectaculars of the 1990s including Walks on Water, The Double Wedding and Tantamount Esperance.

Her internationally celebrated solo with a horse – My Mathematics – was produced by Michael Morris' Cultural Industry, and a series of vignettes with horses were presented by The Banff Centre, Canada and The Serpentine Gallery, London. The Long Time Ago Story – a collaboration with a composer David Sawyer was commissioned for BBC Radio 4 in 2003. Ornamental Happiness, a show in song and circus, opened the Liverpool Biennial of Contemporary Art in 2006, followed by Flagrant Wisdom commissioned by the National Glass Centre in 2009. The full length sequel featuring flying, glass, singing and Chinese acrobatics is currently in development.

English's performance works of the 1970s featured in the exhibition WACK! Art and the Feminist Revolution at the Museum of Contemporary Art, Los Angeles, and toured museums in the US and Canada 2007/2009, and in Women in Revolt!. (Tate Britain, London, 2024 and touring). Her installation STORYBOARD, commissioned by the National Glass Centre featured in Interloqui, a group exhibition at Caterina Tognon Arte Contemporanea, to coincide with the 54th Venice Biennale, 2011. She exhibited an installation composed of elements and documents relating to her 1975 performance, Quadrille, in Taking Matters into Our Own Hands at Richard Saltoun and Karsten Schubert, London 2013.

She co-wrote and designed the feature film The Gold Diggers, directed by Sally Potter in 1983. Made with an all female crew and cast it was digitally re-mastered and released on BFI DVD in 2009.

...The Gold Diggers is a key film of early 80s feminist cinema. Made with an all-woman crew, featuring stunning photography by Babette Magolte and a score by Lindsay Cooper it embraces a radical and experimental narrative structure. Celeste (Colette Laffont) is a computer clerk in a bank who becomes fascinated by the relationship between gold and power. Ruby (Julie Christie) is an enigmatic film star in quest of her childhood, her memories and the truth about her own identity. As their paths cross they come to sense that there could be a link between the male struggle for economic supremacy and the female ideal of mysterious but impotent beauty.

English's work with dance includes choreographing Ariadne auf Naxos at the Munich Staatsoper, directed by Tim Albery and her collaborations with choreographer Matthew Hawkins, including Angels and Exiles at the Royal Opera House.

As an actress English has appeared in a wide range of theatre, film and television productions, working with directors including Richard Jones, Sally Potter and Nick Philippou. She has appeared in The Escort; Our Mutual Friend; Surviving Picasso; Cracker (UK TV series); The Brooch Pin and Sinful Clasp; and The Witches.

English's awards include The Time Out Performance Award, The Wingate Scholarship and the Paul Hamlyn Award for Artists. In 2025 she was awarded an honorary doctorate by Leeds School of Arts, Leeds Beckett University for her services to the arts: 'The award recognises Rose’s remarkable five-decade career as a pioneering figure in performance art'.

English was the subject of a retrospective at the Museum der Moderne, Salzburg in 2024-5. She is represented by Richard Saltoun Gallery.
