= American Woman (2018 film) =

2018 film directed by Jake Scott

- Theatrical release poster
- Directed by: Jake Scott
- Written by: Brad Ingelsby
- Produced by: Ridley Scott; Kevin J. Walsh; Michael Pruss; Brad Feinstein
- Starring: Sienna Miller; Christina Hendricks; Aaron Paul; Will Sasso; Pat Healy; Amy Madigan
- Cinematography: John Mathieson
- Edited by: Joi McMillon
- Music by: Adam Wiltzie
- Production companies: Endeavor Content; Scott Free Productions; Romulus Entertainment; Mill House Motion Pictures
- Distributed by: Signature Entertainment (United Kingdom); Roadside Attractions Vertical Entertainment (United States)
- Release dates: September 9, 2018 (TIFF); June 14, 2019 (United States)
- Running time: 112 minutes
- Countries: United Kingdom; United States
- Language: English
- Box office: $236,637

American Woman is a 2018 drama film directed by Jake Scott and written by Brad Ingelsby. The film stars Sienna Miller, Christina Hendricks, Aaron Paul, Will Sasso, Pat Healy, and Amy Madigan.

American Woman had its world premiere at the 2018 Toronto International Film Festival on September 9, 2018, and was released in the United States on June 14, 2019, by Roadside Attractions and Vertical Entertainment. The film received generally favorable reviews.

== Plot ==
In 1998, in a rural small-town in Pennsylvania, Deb Callahan is a 33-year-old single mother residing with her teenage daughter, Bridget, and Bridget's infant son Jesse. Deb had Bridget when she was 16 years old and Bridget's father is not in the picture. They live directly across the street from her older sister, Katherine, Katherine's husband Terry, and their children. Deb and Katherine have a loving but tempestuous relationship, as the reserved Katherine is critical of Deb's recklessness and her affairs with men. It is a similar relationship to that of Deb and her mother, Peggy. One night, Deb babysits Jesse so Bridget can go on a date with Tyler, Jesse's father, with whom Bridget has had an on-and-off relationship. The next morning, Deb realizes Bridget has not returned home. She calls around frantically and questions Tyler, who claims he and Bridget argued and that she went to her friend Jenna's home. Jenna tells Deb that Bridget left late that evening, saying she was going to walk home.

Detective Sergeant Morris begins an investigation into Bridget's disappearance, and Deb insists that Tyler is responsible, claiming she believes he has abused Bridget. Feeling helpless in the efforts to find Bridget, Debra seeks solace in Brett, a married man with whom she is having an affair. When Brett fails to meet with her for one of their trysts, she drunkenly confronts him and his wife in their home, and smashes various items in the kitchen. She then leaves, driving recklessly before removing her hands from the steering wheel and crashing down an embankment, attempting suicide. However, she survives the event unscathed.

Several years later, Bridget's disappearance has turned into a cold case, and Deb is raising Jesse. Her boyfriend Ray, a refinery worker, has moved into her home. Ray is controlling and abusive toward Deb and Jesse, but she tolerates it as he gives her financial support while she attends a local college. However, she eventually forces him out of the home when he violently beats her in front of Jesse after inquiring about what time she got home the previous night with friends. Deb continues to hold vigils on Bridget's passing birthdays, and reunites with Tyler, who has recently completed drug rehabilitation, allowing him to visit with Jesse. Tyler tells Deb that he blames her for his drug addiction, as she publicly accused him in Bridget's disappearance. Deb apologizes, and explains she has not suspected him in Bridget's disappearance in a long time. Tyler tries to build a relationship with Jesse, but is unsuccessful.

Upon finishing college, Debra finds work as a human resources supervisor at a local assisted living facility, where her mother, Peggy, eventually comes to live after having a stroke. Some time later, Katherine encourages Debra to begin dating, and plans a double date with Chris, a friend of Terry's. Debra is initially impervious to Chris's advances, but the two become close quickly and marry after eight weeks of dating. Chris develops a close fatherly relationship with Jesse, now an adolescent. After several years, however, Debra and Chris's relationship deteriorates and she discovers he is having an affair. She confronts him before kicking him out of her home.

One day, 11 years after Bridget went missing, Sergeant Morris arrives at Debra's work to notify her that a serial killer has led them to Bridget's remains, which they unearthed in a shallow grave. Debra goes to visit Bridget's killer in jail hoping to learn of her daughter's fate. Later, Sergeant Morris brings Debra and Jesse to the crime scene where Bridget's remains were discovered. Debra sobs, and lies in her daughter's shallow grave.

Some time later, Debra decides to sell her house and move away with Jesse to start a new life. She has a garage sale which Chris visits. He tells her he still loves her, but Debra is not forthcoming to his advances and bids him goodbye. After the sale, Debra and Jesse say emotional goodbyes to Katherine, Terry, and Peggy, before driving away toward their new home.

== Cast ==
- Sienna Miller as Deborah Callahan
- Christina Hendricks as Katherine Callahan
- Aaron Paul as Chris
- Amy Madigan as Margaret "Peggy" Callahan
- Pat Healy as Ray
- Will Sasso as Terry
- Sky Ferreira as Bridget Callahan
- Alex Neustaedter as Tyler Hanrick
- Aidan Fiske as Jesse Hanrick Callahan
  - Aidan McGraw as Young Jesse
- Kelly Rose Golden as Jenna Cunningham
- E. Roger Mitchell as Detective Sergeant Morris
- Kentucker Audley as Brett Toback
- Rachel Singer as Mrs. Derrick
- Gavin Earle as Young Murph

== Production ==
In February 2017, it was announced Sienna Miller, Jacki Weaver, Aaron Paul and Christina Hendricks joined the cast of the film, with Jake Scott directing from a screenplay by Brad Ingelsby. Ridley Scott, Kevin J. Walsh and Michael Pruss will serve as producers under their Scott Free Productions banner, while Brad Feinstein will produce on behalf of Romulus Entertainment, which will also finance. Erika Olde will serve as an executive producer. In April 2017, Amy Madigan, Pat Healy, Ken Marino, Sky Ferreira, and Macon Blair joined the cast of the film. At the time, the project was titled The Burning Woman.

Principal photography began in April 2017, in Brockton, Massachusetts.

== Release ==
The film had its world premiere at the 2018 Toronto International Film Festival on September 9, 2018. Shortly after, Roadside Attractions and Vertical Entertainment acquired distribution rights to the film.

=== Box office ===
The film was given a limited release in the United States on June 14, 2019, opening in 117 theaters. It debuted at number 26 at the U.S. box office, earning $110,552 its opening weekend.

=== Critical response ===
On the review aggregator website Rotten Tomatoes, 89% of 79 critics' reviews are positive. The website's consensus reads: "American Woman finds poignant drama in one woman's grueling odyssey, thanks in no small part to Sienna Miller's outstanding work in the leading role." Metacritic, which uses a weighted average, assigned the film a score of 68 out of 100, based on 18 critics, indicating "generally favorable" reviews.

Glenn Kenny of The New York Times deemed the film a "working class character study," adding: "The performances are excellent, and Ingelsby's dialogue largely rings true. But while the movie is indeed considered and conscientious, it's also careful. It doesn't risk going over any edges itself." The Los Angeles Times's Kimber Myers praised Miller's performance, writing: "At first, the bones of American Woman feel familiar, with its titular character's sharp elbows pushing us away. We've seen dramas led by brash women before; the one here is played by Sienna Miller, displaying more rage and range in a single film than some actresses get to show in their whole careers. But as the movie and its protagonist evolve, [it] at once reveals its soft underbelly while landing a surprisingly effective punch to the gut — largely thanks to Miller's deft performance."

Rex Reed, writing for The New York Observer, was laudatory of Miller's performance and the narrative development, noting that the film "catalogues years of pain that develop as naturally as fingerprints and culminates in the eventual revelation of what actually happened to Bridget, but American Woman is elevated beyond its woes by Miller's galvanizing, astonishing and multi-dimensional centerpiece development of character. You can't take your eyes off her because she has the extraordinary pace and timing to make you feel what she's doing while she's doing it, and you can't wait for her to do more."

Dennis Harvey of Variety was less praising of the film, writing that it "doesn't evince a firm enough grasp on the rhythms of lower-middle-class life in Rust Belt Pennsylvania to compensate for the over-dependence on crisis melodrama in Brad Inglesby's script. While offering some nice grace notes, the film feels too soap-operatic to meet the high bar of its more literary-minded pretensions. Unlikely to get the kind of critical support that would justify art-house exposure, it seems destined for quality cable sales." The San Francisco Chronicle's Carla Meyer described the film as "relentlessly downbeat," and criticized it for its lack of focus on the disappearance of Debra's daughter: "Had the movie been more focused on Deb's devastation over Bridget's disappearance, Miller might have been great in it. She is quietly affecting when Deb steps away from whatever current romantic drama envelops her to remember her daughter."
