= Rage (2009 American film) =

- Film poster
- Directed by: Sally Potter
- Written by: Sally Potter
- Produced by: Robert Hiestand; Andrew Fierberg; Christopher Sheppard
- Starring: Jude Law; Judi Dench; Dianne Wiest; Steve Buscemi; John Leguizamo; Lily Cole
- Cinematography: Steven Fierberg
- Edited by: Daniel Goddard
- Distributed by: Cinetic Media
- Release date: February 8, 2009 (Berlinale)
- Running time: 98 minutes
- Country: United States
- Language: English

Rage is a 2009 American satirical mystery art film written and directed by Sally Potter, starring Jude Law and Judi Dench. The filmmakers said that the film created a new genre in filmmaking, called "naked cinema".

== Premise ==
A young blogger at a New York City fashion house shoots behind-the-scenes interviews on his cell phone.

== Cast ==
- Jude Law as Minx
- Steve Buscemi as Frank
- Judi Dench as Mona Carvell
- John Leguizamo as Jed
- Dianne Wiest as Miss Roth
- Eddie Izzard as Tiny Diamonds
- Riz Ahmed as Vijay
- Bob Balaban as Mr. White
- Lily Cole as Lettuce Leaf
- Patrick J. Adams as Dwight Angel
- David Oyelowo as Homer
- Adriana Barraza as Anita de Los Angeles
- Simon Abkarian as Merlin
- Jakob Cedergren as Otto

== Release ==
The film premiered at the 2009 Berlin International Film Festival and was nominated for the Golden Berlin Bear.

The DVD was released on September 22, 2009, in the US, and September 28, 2009, in the UK. A special edition version of the DVD was released through the official Rage website.

Babelgum premiered the film on mobile phones and internet at the same time as the cinema and DVD release. Babelgum released Rage in the UK, North America, Australia, Italy, France, Germany and Spain.

Rage is the world's first feature film to debut on mobile phones. The movie was to be shown in seven episodes, beginning on September 21, 2009. The online screening began on September 28, 2009.

Rage had its New York screen premiere on September 21, 2009, at "The Box".

== Reception ==
The film was widely panned by critics, with criticism mostly focusing on its acting, direction, plot, script and length, as well as that it did not achieve its satirical intentions. On Rotten Tomatoes it has an approval rating of 29% based on reviews from 7 critics.

It has been described as 'lame' and an 'indignant annoyance' by Leslie Felperin of Variety and 'claustrophobic, repetitive and mostly ludicrous' by Richard Mowe of Boxoffice Magazine.

In a rare positive review, Caryn James of Newsweek said 'you see how pertinent Potter is to the topsy-turvy world of filmmaking today, how smoothly she blends the cutting edge and the mainstream, how underappreciated she has been.'
