= The Man Who Cried =

- Theatrical release poster
- Directed by: Sally Potter
- Written by: Sally Potter
- Produced by: Christopher Sheppard
- Starring: Christina Ricci; Cate Blanchett; John Turturro; Johnny Depp; Harry Dean Stanton
- Cinematography: Sacha Vierny
- Edited by: Hervé Schneid
- Music by: Osvaldo Golijov
- Production companies: StudioCanal; Working Title Films; Adventure Pictures
- Distributed by: Universal Pictures (United Kingdom, Ireland, South Africa, Australia, New Zealand and Benelux; through United International Pictures); Mars Distribution (France)
- Release date: 2 September 2000 (Venice)
- Running time: 100 minutes
- Countries: United Kingdom; France
- Languages: English; Yiddish; Russian; French; Italian; Romani; Romanian
- Budget: $20 million
- Box office: $1.8 million

The Man Who Cried is a 2000 historical musical drama film written and directed by Sally Potter, and starring Christina Ricci, Cate Blanchett, Johnny Depp, Harry Dean Stanton and John Turturro. The film tells the story of a young Jewish girl who, after being separated from her father in Soviet Russia, grows up in England and moves to Paris as a young adult, shortly before the beginning of World War II. It is the last film worked on by the French cinematographer Sacha Vierny.

== Plot ==
Fegele Abramovich, a Russian Jew is separated from her father as a child in 1927. Her father has travelled to America to seek his fortune and plans to send for Fegele and her grandmother. Before leaving, he sings "Je Crois Entendre Encore" from the Bizet opera Les pêcheurs de perles to her. After her father leaves, the village is attacked and burned in a pogrom. Fegele escapes with the help of neighbours; after overcoming many obstacles, she is crowded onto a boat headed for Britain, with only a photo of her father and a coin given by her grandmother.

A British official renames her "Susan" and places her with foster parents. Schoolmates taunt her by calling her a "gypsy", but she does not yet understand English. A teacher at the school overhears her singing "Je Crois Entendre Encore" in Yiddish, and teaches her to sing and speak in English.

An older Suzie joins a singing dance troupe. In Paris she shares an apartment with an older Russian dancer named Lola. They perform at a formal party alongside a mysterious performing horseman, Cesar, a Romani to whom Suzie becomes attracted. They overhear a tenor singing "Je Crois Entendre Encore"; the voice belongs to Dante, an Italian opera singer who immediately catches Lola's eye. Lola falls for his charms, enticed by his wealth and success. Dante, Lola, Suzie, and Cesar all work for an opera company directed by Felix Perlman. Dante is an imperious follower of Mussolini; this alienates him from Suzie even as he becomes Lola's lover. Meanwhile, Cesar introduces Suzie to his "family" (essentially his entire tribe), and they fall in love.

Dante rifles through Suzie's things after a dalliance with Lola in the apartment, and deduces her Jewish heritage from her father's photo. An elderly Jewish neighbour downstairs, Madame Goldstein, also knows that Suzie is Jewish and has warned her of the dangers foretold by the German invasion of Poland. A year later, as the Germans approach Paris, an exodus begins of Jews fleeing from the Nazis. Crowds for the opera dwindle, leaving only Dante and Suzie as cast members. Dante attempts to seduce Suzie, who rebuffs him. He lashes out, insulting her heritage and that of Cesar. Perlman reminds Dante that if Mussolini aligns with the Nazis, Dante's own position in Paris would be precarious. Perlman closes down the show and the Nazis enter Paris the following morning.

Dante reluctantly returns to his earlier role as minstrel. After another rebuff from Suzie, Dante betrays her to a German officer as a Jew. Lola warns Suzie and urges her to leave Paris, and purchases tickets for them both on an ocean liner headed for America. The night of the party, the Nazis attack the Romani village and kill a child. When Cesar comes to her apartment to say goodbye, Suzie expresses her desire to stay and help Cesar fight the Nazis for his family, but he tells her she must flee and find her father. They share a tender last evening together.

Lola is killed when the ocean liner is torpedoed and sunk. Suzie is rescued and brought to New York.

Suzie searches for her father and discovers that he changed his name, gave up singing, and moved west after hearing about the attack on his home village, which he assumed killed all the members of his family. Suzie finds him in Hollywood where he has established himself as a studio head with a new family. Suzie learns also that he's dying. She goes to the hospital, walks past his new wife and children who are waiting outside the door to his room, and is reunited with her father. Overjoyed, he cries as she sits at his side singing "Je Crois Entendre Encore" in Yiddish.

== Cast ==
- Christina Ricci as Suzie
- Oleg Yankovsky as Father
- Claudia Lander-Duke as Young Suzie
- Cate Blanchett as Lola
- Miriam Karlin as Madame Goldstein
- Johnny Depp as Cesar
- Harry Dean Stanton as Felix Perlman
- John Turturro as Dante Dominio
- Josh Bradford as extra
- Don Fellows as Joe (Final film role)

The singing voices for the characters of Dante and Suzie were provided by Salvatore Licitra and Iva Bittova, respectively.

== Release ==
The film was first presented at the Venice Film Festival on 2 September 2000. The film screened at the London Film Festival; the Mar del Plata Film Festival, Argentina; the Tokyo International Film Festival & the Reykjavik Film Festival, Iceland among others.

== Reception ==
The film received mixed to negative reviews, currently holding a 35% 'rotten' rating on review aggregate Rotten Tomatoes. The consensus, based on 69 reviews, says 'The storyline is overwrought and awkward, and the audience is distanced from the flatly drawn characters.' Metacritic calculated an average score of 40 out of 100 based on 22 reviews, indicating "mixed or average reviews".

=== Awards ===
Wins

- National Board of Review: NBR Award; Best Supporting Actress, Cate Blanchett; 2001.
- Florida Film Critics Circle Awards: FFCC Award; Best Supporting Actress, Cate Blanchett; 2002.

Nominations

- Venice Film Festival: Golden Lion, Sally Potter; 2000.

== Soundtrack ==
The Man Who Cried OST

Soundtrack album by Osvaldo Golijov
- Released: 22 May 2001
- Genre: Soundtrack
- Length: 53:49
- Label: Sony Classical
- Producer: Sally Potter

Soundtrack
Review scores
Source	Rating
AllMusic	link
SoundtrackNet	link

The Man Who Cried: Original Motion Picture Soundtrack was released 22 May 2001. It features new music composed by Osvaldo Golijov, and was produced by Sally Potter and performed by the Royal Opera House Orchestra Covent Garden, Salvatore Licitra, and Taraf de Haïdouks.

No.	Title	Writer(s)	Performer(s)	Length
1.	"Je crois entendre encore" (Voice)	Georges Bizet	Salvatore Licitra & The Orchestra of the Royal Opera House	3:42
2.	"Jalousie" (Instrumental)	Jacob Gade, Winifred May	Vasko Vassilev; Pamela Nicholson	3:00
3.	"Di quella pira" (Voice)	Giuseppe Verdi	Licitra	2:15
4.	"Close Your Eyes" (Instrumental)	Osvaldo Golijov	Kronos Quartet	3:45
5.	"Tiganeasca" (Instrumental)	Sapo Perapaskero	Taraf de Haïdouks	2:27
6.	"E Lucevan le stelle" (Voice)	Giacomo Puccini	Licitra	3:24
7.	"Cesar's Song" (Instrumental)	Golijov	Kronos Quartet	3:45
8.	"Baladele Revolutiei" (Instrumental)	Perapaskero	Taraf de Haïdouks	3:17
9.	"Dido's Lament" (Voice)	Henry Purcell	Iva Bittová, Taraf de Haïdouks	1:47
10.	"Je crois entendre encore" (Voice)	Bizet	Katia And Marielle Labèque, Salvatore Licitra	3:52
11.	"Ducho Balvaio" (Instrumental)	Perapaskero	Taraf de Haïdouks	3:29
12.	"Torna a surriento" (Voice)	Ernesto de Curtis, Giambattista de Curtis, Alfredo Mazzucchi	Katia Labèque, Salvatore Licitra	3:12
13.	"Without a Word" (Instrumental)	Golijov	Kronos Quartet, Fred Frith, Christopher Laurence	3:34
14.	"Bangi Khelimos" (Instrumental)	Perapaskero	Taraf de Haïdouks	2:15
15.	"Gloomy Sunday" (Voice)	Rezsö Seress, László Jávor, Desmond Carter	Iva Bittova, Brian Dee, Andrew Cleyndert, Clarke Tracey, Steven Prutsman	3:27
16.	"Close Your Eyes (Yiddish)" (Voice)	Golijov, Sally Potter	Salvatore Licitra, Kronos Quartet	2:13
17.	"Je crois entendre encore (Yiddish)" (Voice)	Bizet	Licitra	4:16
