= Orlando (film) =

1992 film by Sally Potter

- UK theatrical release poster
- Directed by: Sally Potter
- Screenplay by: Sally Potter
- Based on: Orlando: A Biography by Virginia Woolf
- Produced by: Christopher Sheppard
- Starring: Tilda Swinton; Billy Zane; Lothaire Bluteau; John Wood; Charlotte Valandrey; Heathcote Williams; Quentin Crisp
- Cinematography: Aleksei Rodionov
- Edited by: Hervé Schneid
- Music by: David Motion; Sally Potter
- Production companies: Adventure Pictures; Lenfilm; Mikado Film; Rio; Sigma Film Productions
- Distributed by: Electric Pictures (United Kingdom); Rezo Films Rio (France); Mikado Film (Italy); Concorde Film (Netherlands)
- Release dates: 1 September 1992 (Venice); 11 December 1992 (Italy); 27 January 1993 (France); 28 January 1993 (Netherlands); 12 March 1993 (United Kingdom)
- Running time: 93 minutes
- Countries: United Kingdom; France; Italy; Netherlands; Russia
- Language: English
- Budget: $4 million
- Box office: $13 million

Orlando is a 1992 fantasy drama film loosely based on Virginia Woolf's 1928 novel Orlando: A Biography, starring Tilda Swinton as Orlando, Billy Zane as Shelmerdine, and Quentin Crisp as Queen Elizabeth I. It was written and directed by Sally Potter, who also co-wrote the score with David Motion. The film is an international co-production of the United Kingdom, France, Italy, the Netherlands and Russia.

Critics praised the film and particularly applauded its visual treatment of the settings of Woolf's novel. The film premiered in competition at the 49th Venice International Film Festival, and was re-released in select US cinemas on 23 July 2010.

== Plot ==
The story begins in the Elizabethan era, shortly before the death of Queen Elizabeth I in 1603. On her deathbed, the queen promises an androgynous young nobleman named Orlando a large tract of land and a castle built on it, along with a generous monetary gift; both Orlando and his heirs would keep the land and inheritance forever, but Elizabeth will bequeath it to him only if he assents to an unusual command: "Do not fade. Do not wither. Do not grow old." Orlando acquiesces and reposes in splendid isolation in the castle for a couple of centuries during which time he dabbles in poetry and art. His attempts to befriend a celebrated poet backfire when the poet ridicules his verse. Orlando then travels as English ambassador to the Ottoman Empire. After years of diplomatic service, he participates in a battle but flees after witnessing the first death. Waking seven days later, he learns something startling: he has transformed into a woman.

The now Lady Orlando comes home to her estate in Middle-Eastern attire, only to learn that she faces several impending lawsuits arguing that Orlando was a woman all along and therefore has no right to the land or any of the royal inheritance that the queen had promised. The succeeding two centuries tire Orlando; the court case, bad luck in love, and the wars of British history eventually bring the story to the present day (the early 1990s). Orlando now has a young daughter in tow and is in search of a publisher for her book. The literary editor who judges the work as "quite good" is portrayed by Heathcote Williams—the same actor who played the poet who had, earlier in the film, denigrated Orlando's poetry. Having lived a most bizarre existence, Orlando, relaxing with her daughter, points out to her an angel.

=== Differences from the novel ===
Director Potter described her approach to the adaptation as follows:

My task ... was to find a way of remaining true to the spirit of the book and to Virginia Woolf's intentions, whilst being ruthless with changing the book in any way necessary to make it work cinematically ... The most immediate changes were structural. The storyline was simplified [and] any events which did not significantly further Orlando's story were dropped.

The film contains some anachronisms not present in the novel. For example, upon Orlando's arrival in Constantinople in the year 1700, England is referred to as a "green and pleasant land", a line from William Blake's Jerusalem, which in reality was not written until 1804.

Potter argued that "whereas the novel could withstand abstraction and arbitrariness (such as Orlando's change of sex), cinema is more pragmatic." She continued,

There had to be reasons—however flimsy—to propel us along a journey based itself on a kind of suspension of disbelief. Thus, Queen Elizabeth bestows Orlando's long life upon him ... whereas in the book it remains unexplained. And Orlando's change of sex in the film is the result of his having reached a crisis point—a crisis of masculine identity.

At the end of the film, Orlando has a daughter, whereas in the novel she had a son. Potter said that she intended Orlando's breaking the fourth wall to be an equivalent to Woolf's direct addresses to her readers, (Note: See List of narrative techniques.) and that this was her attempt at converting Woolf's literary wit into a more "cinematic" humour. One obvious similarity remained, however: The film ends in its present day, 1992, (Note: From the press kit: "[T]he ending of the film needed to be brought into the present in order to remain true to Virginia Woolf's use of real-time at the end of the novel (where the story finishes just as she puts down her pen to finish the book). Coming up to the present day meant acknowledging some key events of the 20th century—the two world wars, the electronic revolution—the contraction of space through time reinvented by speed.") just as Woolf's novel ends in its present day, 1928.

== Cast ==
- Tilda Swinton as Orlando
- Billy Zane as Shelmerdine
- Lothaire Bluteau as The Khan
- John Wood as Archduke Harry
- Charlotte Valandrey as Princess Sasha
- Heathcote Williams as Nick Greene / The Publisher
- Quentin Crisp as Queen Elizabeth I
- Peter Eyre as Mr Pope
- Thom Hoffman as King William of Orange
- Kathryn Hunter as Countess
- Ned Sherrin as Addison
- Jimmy Somerville as Falsetto / Angel
- Dudley Sutton as James I
- John Bott as Orlando's Father
- Elaine Banham as Orlando's Mother
- Anna Farnworth as Clorinda
- Sara Mair-Thomas as Favilla
- Anna Healy as Euphrosyne
- Simon Russell Beale as Earl of Moray
- Matthew Sim as Lord Francis Vere
- Toby Stephens as Othello
- Oleg Pogudin (credited as Oleg Pogodin) as Desdemona
- Toby Jones as Second Valet
- Sarah Crowden as Queen Mary
- Roger Hammond as Mr Swift

== Production ==
When first pitching her treatment in 1984, Potter was told by "industry professionals" that the story was "unmakable, impossible, far too expensive and anyway not interesting." Nevertheless, in 1988 she began writing the script and raising money.

Potter saw Swinton in the Manfred Karge play Man to Man and said that there was a "profound subtlety about the way she took on male body language and handled maleness and femaleness." In Potter's words, Quentin Crisp was the "Queen of Queens ... particularly in the context of Virginia Woolf's gender-bending politics" and thus fit to play the aged Queen Elizabeth.

Potter chose to film much of the Constantinople portion of the book in the isolated city of Khiva in Uzbekistan and made use of the forest of carved columns in the city's 18th-century Djuma Mosque.

=== Poetry ===
Portions of the following texts are used:

- The Faerie Queene by Edmund Spenser
- Shakespeare's Othello and Sonnet 29
- "Women" ("Sūrat an-Nisāʼ") from the Quran
- "The Indian Serenade" and The Revolt of Islam by Percy Bysshe Shelley

=== Music ===
The following songs are featured:

- Jimmy Somerville – "Eliza Is the Fairest Queen" (composed by Edward Johnson)
- Andrew Watts with Peter Hayward on harpsichord – "Where'er You Walk" (from Semele; composed by George Frideric Handel)
- Jimmy Somerville – "Coming" (composed by Potter, Jimmy Somerville, and David Motion)
- Anonymous – "Pavana"

== Reception ==
=== Box office ===
The film grossed $5.3 million in the United States and Canada. It also grossed $2 million in the United Kingdom; $1.9 million in Italy; $1.6 million in Germany and over $1 million in Australia. By October 1993, it had grossed $13 million.

=== Critical response ===
Before Orlando's release in the United States in June 1993, Vincent Canby wrote in an effusively positive review:

This ravishing and witty spectacle invades the mind through eyes that are dazzled without ever being anesthetised. Throughout Ms. Potter's Orlando, as in Woolf's, there [is] a piercing kind of common sense and a joy that, because they are so rare these days in any medium, create their own kind of cinematic suspense and delightedly surprised laughter. Orlando could well become a classic of a very special kind—not mainstream perhaps—but a model for independent film makers who follow their own irrational muses, sometimes to unmourned obscurity, occasionally to glory.

Furthermore, Canby cautioned that while the novel stands on its own, he was not sure if the film does. He wrote, "Potter's achievement is in translating to film something of the breadth of Woolf's remarkable range of interests, not only in language and literature, but also in history, nature, weather, animals, the relation of the sexes and the very nature of the sexes."

By contrast, Kenneth Turan of the Los Angeles Times described Orlando as "hollow ... smug ... and self-satisfied" and complained that "any kind of emotional connection to match [Orlando's] carefully constructed look ... is simply not to be had."

By 2010, Orlando was received as part of Potter's successful oeuvre with Matthew Connelly and had one critic affirming in the first line of his review that "Rarely have source material, director, and leading actress been more in alignment than in Orlando, the 1992 adaptation of Virginia Woolf's novel, directed by Sally Potter and starring Tilda Swinton ... Watching Orlando some 17 years after its U.S. theatrical run, however, proves a welcome reminder of just how skillfully they [Potter and Swinton] marshalled their respective gifts here, how openly they entered into a dialogue with Woolf's playful, slippery text."

On the review aggregator website Rotten Tomatoes, the film holds an approval rating of 86% based on 64 reviews. The website's critics consensus reads, "Orlando can't match its visual delights with equally hefty narrative, but it's so much fun to watch that it doesn't need to."

=== Accolades ===
Award	Date of ceremony	Category	Recipients	Result	Ref.
Academy Awards	21 March 1994	Best Art Direction	Ben Van Os and Jan Roelfs	Nominated	
Academy Awards	21 March 1994	Best Costume Design	Sandy Powell	Nominated	
British Academy Film Awards	15 April 1994	Best Costume Design	Sandy Powell	Nominated	
British Academy Film Awards	15 April 1994	Best Make-Up	Morag Ross	Won	
European Film Awards	4 December 1993	Young European Film	Sally Potter	Won	
European Film Awards	4 December 1993	European Actress	Tilda Swinton	Nominated	
Guldbagge Awards	31 October 1994	Best Foreign Film	Sally Potter	Nominated	
Independent Spirit Awards	19 March 1994	Best Foreign Film	Sally Potter	Nominated	

== Orlando: The Queer Element ==
Poster advertising Orlando: The Queer Element at Hanbury Hall

In 2017, the film was screened multiple times as part of a multi-media arts project Orlando: The Queer Element. The project explored issues of science and gender through history and was organised by the theatre company Clay & Diamonds, in association with organisations such as the BFI and the National Trust, with funding from the Wellcome Trust and Arts Council England.

A one-off immersive performance using five actors—some from the LGBT community—took place on Friday 24 March at the BFI Flare: London LGBT Film Festival, alongside a 25th Anniversary screening of the film.

A separate series of performances was mounted in June by Clay & Diamonds with over 30 actors from the performance training company Fourth Monkey. Together they created a site-specific piece that was performed at the National Trust venues Hanbury Hall and Knole house (the home of Vita Sackville-West, Woolf's lover, and the inspiration for Orlando). These performances were made for both the public and school audiences, with many of the performances featuring a screening of the film. The event also served part of the National Trust's "Prejudice and Pride" programme, which marked 50 years since the partial decriminalisation of homosexuality in the United Kingdom with the passage of the Sexual Offences Act 1967.

The project also featured the screening of a number of short art films created by Masters in Design students at the Royal College of Art, as well as a series of scientific workshops and lectures.

== 2020 Met Gala inspiration ==
Orlando, both the film and the novel, was the primary inspiration for both the 2020 spring exhibition of the Costume Institute at the Metropolitan Museum of Art and the 2020 Met Gala. The exhibition, entitled "About Time: Fashion and Duration", was specifically inspired by the "labyrinth" scene in Orlando, where Tilda Swinton runs through the labyrinth dressed in an 18th-century gown before she reappears dressed in mid-19th century garb. Using that scene as the initial inspiration, curator Andrew Bolton took "Orlando's concept of time and the manner in which she/he moves seamlessly through the centuries" to "trace more than a century and a half of fashion, illustrating how garments of the past influence the present." Although the COVID-19 pandemic forced the cancellation of the Met Gala, the opening of the exhibition itself was postponed until October 2020.
