= La Cucina (film) =

- Film cover
- Directed by: Allison R. Hebble; Zed Starkovich
- Written by: A. W. Gryphon
- Produced by: A. W. Gryphon; Zachary Kahn; Jackie Olson; Crystal Santos; Starlotte Dawn Smith
- Cinematography: Alan Caudillo
- Edited by: Zed Starkovich
- Music by: Ian Ball
- Distributed by: Anthem Pictures
- Release date: October 19, 2007 (Hollywood International Film Festival)
- Country: United States

La Cucina is a 2007 American romantic drama film written by A. W. Gryphon. The film stars Christina Hendricks, Joaquim de Almeida, Leisha Hailey, and Rachel Hunter. It was directed by first time directors Allison Hebble & Zed B. Starkovich. The film was scored by Ian Ball from the band Gomez. Although Ball had contributed songs to other films such as the Academy Award winning film American Beauty, this was his first attempt at scoring an entire film.

The film premiered at the Hollywood Film Festival on October 19, 2007. It won Best Feature at the Beloit International Film Festival and the Los Angeles Backlot Film Festival, and Best Screenplay at the Bragacine International Film Festival in Portugal. A Best Actor nod went to Joaquim de Almeida and a Producers Award to Executive Producer Starlotte Smith at the Bragacine International Film Festival. It was an Official Selection of the La Femme Film Festival and the Portocine International Film Festival, as well as a Special Screening at the Cinema Film Festival. It premiered on Showtime on December 4, 2009. Anthem Pictures released La Cucina on DVD and Blu-ray on January 12, 2010.

A.W. Gryphon also wrote the supernatural novel Blood Moon. Allison Hebble, Zed Starkovich and Starlotte Dawn Smith were all neighbors in West Hollywood. They got to talking one day over a glass of wine and decided to make a movie. They called some friends and less than a year later went into production on La Cucina.

== Plot ==
La Cucina is a brief slice of life that is set in present day Los Angeles, on a hot summer evening in a West Hollywood apartment building. An intimate character study, it focuses on three couples and their very different relationships over food and wine. A young writer, Lily (Hendricks), goes on an emotional roller coaster with the much older (17 years) and sophisticated Michael (Almeida). They navigate through a web of exploration on marriage, cheating, babies, and entrapment. In the kitchen above, the very pregnant Shelly (Hailey) is terrified that becoming a mother will drive away her husband and has turned for advice to her lesbian friend Jude (Hunter), sure that this magnificent cook who has been in a long-term relationship has it all figured out. It is revealed that Shelly has her own secrets that fuel her fear and Jude's relationship may not be exactly as it appears. They struggle through—fighting, laughing, crying, cooking & eating—trying to work out what really makes relationships work.

== Cast ==
- Christina Hendricks as Lily
- Joaquim de Almeida as Michael
- Leisha Hailey as Shelly
- Rachel Hunter as Jude
- Kala Savage as Raven
- Oz Perkins as Chris
- Michael Cornacchia as Andy
- Clare Carey as Celia

== Reviews ==
"Move over Julia Child, Christina Hendricks is in the kitchen!"

"4 stars. La Cucina made me want to grab a bottle of Chianti and start cooking!"
