= The Gold Diggers (1983 film) =

1983 film by Sally Potter

- Directed by: Sally Potter
- Written by: Lindsay Cooper; Rose English; Sally Potter
- Produced by: Nita Amy; Donna Grey
- Starring: Julie Christie; Kassandra Colson; Siobhan Davies
- Cinematography: Babette Mangolte
- Edited by: Sally Potter
- Music by: Lindsay Cooper
- Release date: 1983 (UK)
- Running time: 89 minutes
- Country: United Kingdom
- Language: English

The Gold Diggers is a 1983 British film directed by Sally Potter, her debut, and stars Julie Christie, Kassandra Colson and Siobhan Davies. It was written by Sally Potter and Rose English. The movie was made with an all-female crew, and features photography by Babette Mangolte and a score by Lindsay Cooper.

== Cast ==
- Julie Christie as Ruby
- Colette Laffont as Celeste
- Hilary Westlake as Ruby's Mother
- David Gale as The Expert
- Thom Osborn as Expert's Assistant
- Jacky Lansley as Tap Dancer
- George Antoni as Stage Manager(as George Yiasoumi)
- Trevor Stuart as Man on Stage

== Film festivals ==
- Berlin International Film Festival, Germany
- Sydney Film Festival, Australia, Melbourne
- International Film Festival, Australia
- International Film Festival Rotterdam, Netherlands

== Awards ==
- Berlin International Film Festival, Germany – Won 'Zitty' Audience Award
- Florence International Film Festival, Italy – Won Best Film

== Legacy ==
The film was celebrated with a 30th anniversary screening at the 2013 London Feminist Film Festival, who chose it as their 'Feminist Classic' for that year. It has since been screened frequently in the UK, most recently at the British Film Institute in 2017 and by Birds Eye View in 2022.
