= Ginger & Rosa =

2012 British drama film

- Directed by: Sally Potter
- Written by: Sally Potter
- Produced by: Christopher Sheppard; Andrew Litvin
- Starring: Elle Fanning; Alice Englert; Alessandro Nivola; Christina Hendricks; Timothy Spall; Oliver Platt; Jodhi May; Annette Bening
- Cinematography: Robbie Ryan
- Edited by: Anders Refn
- Production companies: British Film Institute; BBC Films; Adventure Pictures; The Match Factory; Ingenious; Media House Capital; Miso Film; Danish Film Institute
- Distributed by: Artificial Eye; (United Kingdom); Universal Pictures; (Denmark); Union Pictures; (Canada)
- Release dates: 7 September 2012 (Toronto); 19 October 2012 (United Kingdom); 15 March 2013 (United States); 29 March 2013 (Canada); 11 April 2013 (Denmark)
- Running time: 90 minutes
- Countries: United Kingdom; Denmark; Canada
- Language: English
- Box office: $1.7 million

Ginger & Rosa is a 2012 coming-of-age drama film written and directed by Sally Potter and distributed by Artificial Eye. The film premiered at the Toronto International Film Festival on 7 September 2012, and was released on 19 October 2012 in the United Kingdom.

== Plot ==
In 1945, best friends Nat and Anoushka give birth, as they hold hands, to two girls named Ginger and Rosa, respectively. Ginger and Rosa grow to become best friends and by 1962, the two are inseparable. Ginger is a compassionate girl with a desire to help the world and Rosa is a passionate young girl with a wild and an almost ungovernable personality. After hearing about the Cuban Missile Crisis on the radio, Ginger becomes interested in the anti-nuclear movement. She expresses her concerns about the dangers of nuclear devastation to Rosa, who attempts to comfort her by taking her to church. Ginger finds validation for her ideas through a group of older activists: Mark 1, Mark 2, and Bella.

An argument over dinner appears to be the catalyst for Nat and her husband Roland to separate. Soon after, Ginger discovers her mother Nat has been asking the school to have more "domestic science" courses so that Ginger is more "prepared for life" than she had been. When Ginger discovers this, she is outraged and tells her mother that she will never have children. Ginger moves out and begins to live with Roland. But he has started a relationship with Rosa, which deeply disturbs Ginger, especially after Rosa tells her that she thinks she is pregnant. Ginger is devastated and runs off to a protest rally, where she is arrested.

After being questioned by a psychiatrist and returning home, Ginger expresses her anxious concerns about the end of the world. Her anxiety is really about her father and Rosa's affair, which she tells her mother. Rosa and her mother arrive. After seeing Rosa clutch her stomach, Nat realizes Rosa is pregnant and runs upstairs, horrified.

Ginger and Mark 1 quickly follow her, but find she locked her door. They call Roland, who breaks the door in, and they find that Nat has overdosed. They rush her to the hospital, and Rosa pleads with Ginger to forgive her.

As Roland and Ginger wait at the hospital, Ginger writes a letter to Rosa, in the form of a poem. In it, she discusses their friendship and differing outlooks, pointing out that Rosa dreams of "everlasting love", while Ginger "loves this world". The poem ends on a hopeful note: Ginger tells Rosa that if everything works out, there will be nothing to forgive, but she'll forgive her anyway. Roland apologises to Ginger, but she turns away and continues to write.

== Cast ==
- Elle Fanning as Ginger
- Alice Englert as Rosa
- Alessandro Nivola as Roland, Ginger's father
- Christina Hendricks as Natalie, Ginger's mother
- Jodhi May as Anoushka, Rosa's mother
- Luke Cloud as Rosa's father
- Timothy Spall as Mark
- Oliver Platt as Mark II
- Annette Bening as May Bella

== Production ==
Ginger & Rosa shot at several locations in Kent including Denge Marsh acoustic mirrors at RAF Denge, Lydd-on-Sea, Lade Beach, Greatstone-on-Sea, Lydd Ranges, Lydd, and Queenborough on the Isle of Sheppey. The film includes the dedication: "In loving memory of Caroline Potter (1930-2010)" who was the director's mother.

== Release ==
The film was released in select theaters in the United States on March 15, 2013 by A24. It later received a VOD and DVD-exclusive release in the United States by Lions Gate Home Entertainment.

== Reception ==
=== Critical response ===
Ginger & Rosa received generally positive reviews from critics. On Rotten Tomatoes the film has an approval rating of 78% based on reviews from 113 critics, with an average rating of 6.70/10. The site's consensus is that "Elle Fanning gives a terrific performance in this powerful coming-of-age tale about a pair of teenage girls whose friendship is unnerved by the threat of nuclear war." On Metacritic, the film has a score of 69 out of 100 based on reviews from 26 critics, indicating "generally favorable reviews".

A.O. Scott of the New York Times praised Fanning for her performance: "Ms. Fanning, who is younger than her character, shows a nearly Streepian mixture of poise, intensity and technical precision. It is frightening how good she is and hard to imagine anything she could not do." Ty Burr, film critic for The Boston Globe, praised her "luminous naturalism that seems the opposite of performance" and felt that "Fanning easily convinces you of Ginger's emotional reality." Roger Ebert of Chicago Sun-Times gave it 3 out of 4 and wrote: "It's a portrait of a time and place, characters keeping company around a simple kitchen table, and the helplessness adolescents feel when faced with the priorities of those in power. What I'll take away from it is the knowledge that now the Fannings have given us two actresses of such potential." Peter Bradshaw of The Guardian wrote: "This is a teenage movie that could in other hands have been precious; instead it has delicacy and intelligence."

Peter Debruge of Variety wrote: ""Potter seems at a loss to communicate the ideas behind her agonizingly elliptical picture, leaving auds to marvel at the gorgeous cinematography and scarlet-red hair of its heroine, earnestly played by Elle Fanning in a project undeserving of her talents."

Swedish critic Pidde Andersson compared the film favourably to the films of Jean Rollin.

=== Accolades ===
Year	Award	Category	Nominated work	Result
2012	Abu Dhabi Film Festival	Best Narrative Film	Sally Potter	Nominated
2012	London Film Festival	Best Film	Sally Potter	Nominated
2012	Valladolid International Film Festival	Best Film	Sally Potter	Nominated
2012	Valladolid International Film Festival	Best Actress	Elle Fanning	Won
2012	Tallinn Black Nights Film Festival	Special Mention	Sally Potter	Won
2012	British Independent Film Awards	Best Actress	Elle Fanning	Nominated
2012	British Independent Film Awards	Best Supporting Actress	Alice Englert	Nominated
2012	British Independent Film Awards	Best Cinematography	Robbie Ryan	Nominated
2012	Broadcast Film Critics Association	Best Young Performer	Elle Fanning	Nominated
2012	Santa Barbara International Film Festival	Virtuoso Award	Elle Fanning	Won
2013	Women Film Critics Circle	Best Young Actress	Elle Fanning	Nominated
2013	Women Film Critics Circle	Best Female Ensemble	Elle Fanning, Alice Englert, Jodhi May, Christina Hendricks, Annette Bening	Won
