= Sally Potter =

English film director and screenwriter (born 1949)

Sally Potter OBE
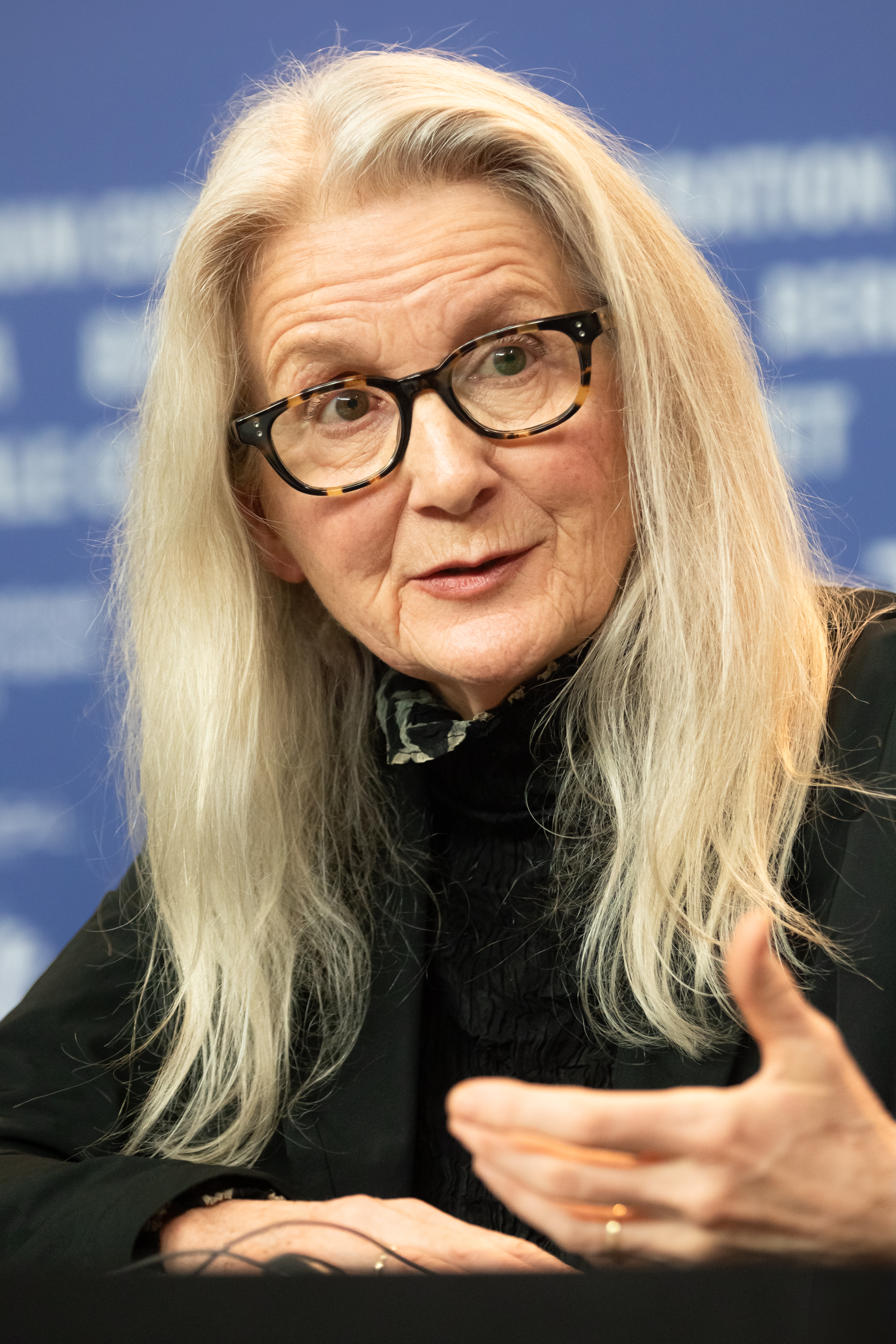
- Potter in 2020
- Born: Charlotte Sally Potter; 19 September 1949 (age 76); London, England
- Education: London Contemporary Dance School
- Occupations: Film director; screenwriter
- Years active: 1979–present
- Relatives: Nic Potter (brother)

Charlotte Sally Potter OBE (born 19 September 1949) is an English film director and screenwriter. She directed Orlando (1992), which won the audience prize for Best Film at the Venice Film Festival.

== Early life ==
Potter was born and raised in London. Her mother was a music teacher and her father was an interior designer and a poet. Her younger brother Nic became the bassist for the rock group Van der Graaf Generator. Speaking about how her background influenced her work as a filmmaker, she has said: "I came from an atheist background and an anarchist background, which meant that I grew up in an environment that was full of questions, where nothing could be taken for granted."

When asked about what she learned about filmmaking from pursuing it as a 17-year-old woman in the UK during the 1960s, Potter laughed.

You know, most kinds of securities are illusions, and we need to kind of duck and weave as filmmakers, go with the flow, go where the harvest is. [...] I knew very early on, if I waited for somebody to give me money to do something, I'd never do anything.

== Career ==
Potter began making amateur films at the age of 14, using an 8mm camera given to her by an uncle. She eventually dropped out of school at the age of 16 to pursue filmmaking. From 1968 to 1970, she worked as a kitchen worker and a picture researcher for the BBC in order to support herself and her work. She had joined the London Film-Makers' Co-op and began making experimental short films, including Jerk (1969) and Play (1970). She later trained as a dancer and choreographer at the London School of Contemporary Dance. She made both film and dance pieces, including Combines (1972), before founding Limited Dance Company with Jacky Lansley.

Potter became an award-winning performance artist and theatre director, with shows including Mounting, Death and the Maiden and Berlin. In addition, she was a member of several music bands (including Feminist Improvising Group, and The Film Music Orchestra), working as a lyricist and singer. She collaborated (as a singer-songwriter) with composer Lindsay Cooper on the song cycle Oh Moscow, which was performed throughout Europe, Russia and North America in the late 1980s and commercially released.

Potter continued as a composer when she collaborated with David Motion on the soundtrack to Orlando. She wrote the score for the 1997 film The Tango Lesson, for which she sang "I am You" in the final scene. Her most recent music work is as producer and co-composer with Fred Frith of the original tracks for Yes and Rage.

Referring to her career as a choreographer, Potter said, "Choreography was the perfect 'poor theatre.' All you needed were willing bodies and some space. So it was as a choreographer that I learnt how to direct and it was as a dancer that I learnt how to work."

Potter returned to filmmaking with her short film Thriller (1979), which was a hit on the international festival circuit. This was followed by her first feature film, The Gold Diggers (1983), starring Julie Christie. She directed another short film, The London Story (1986); a documentary series for Channel 4, Tears, Laughter, Fear and Rage (1986); and I am an Ox, I am a Horse, I am a Man, I am a Woman (1988), a film about women in Soviet cinema.

As director of the internationally distributed Orlando (1992), Potter received greater appreciation for her writing and direction. Starring Tilda Swinton, the film was based on Virginia Woolf's novel of the same name, adapted for the screen by Potter. In addition to two Academy Award nominations, Orlando won more than 25 international awards, including the Felix, awarded by the European Film Academy for the best Young European Film of 1993; and first prizes at St Petersburg, Thessaloniki and other European festivals.

The novel had previously been considered impossible to adapt for the screen, because it took place over 400 years and followed a character whose sex changes from a man to a woman. Funding the feature proved difficult, and Orlando took seven years to complete. Filming and editing took 20 weeks. Preparation for the film, including adapting the novel, funding the film, and scouting locations, took four years.

When asked whether she thought she would continue to work on feminist themes, Potter replied:

I have come to the conclusion that I can't use that term in my work. Not because of a disavowal of the underlying principles that gave birth to that word – the commitment to liberation, dignity, equality. But it has become a trigger word that stops people's thinking. You literally see people's eyes glaze over with exhaustion when the word flashes into the conversation.

She next directed the film, The Tango Lesson (1996), in which she also performed with renowned dancer Pablo Veron. First presented at the Venice Film Festival, the film was awarded the Ombú de Oro for Best Film at the Mar del Plata Film Festival, Argentina; the SADAIC Great Award from the Sociedad Argentina de Autores y Compositores de Música; as well as receiving Best Film nominations from BAFTA and the US National Board of Review. The Tango Lesson is semi-autobiographical, based on Potter's experiences learning Argentinian Tango with Veron while writing the screenplay for Rage.

The Tango Lesson marked Potter's first time performing on screen. Regarding this decision, she stated: "I knew that I had to perform in this one because the impetus for the film came out of my own desire to dance." Potter's professional collaborations with Pablo Veron continue in The Man Who Cried and the stage production of Carmen (2007).

Since The Tango Lesson's release, Potter continued to receive letters from viewers who felt touched by it. In a 2005 interview with FF2 Media's Jan Lisa Huttner, Potter suggested: "I think maybe I'm not the best person to analyze it, but what people pick up on is the passion behind the film: the passion to make the film itself, the passion to dance again. At the age of 46 I put myself in a movie, dancing the Tango with the best tango dancer in the world. [...] It was so terrifying, and so driven by passion at the same time, maybe that's partly what people respond to."

The Man Who Cried (starring Johnny Depp, Christina Ricci, Cate Blanchett and John Turturro), premiered at the Venice Film Festival in 2000. Ricci plays a Jewish girl who, separated from her father when she was young in Soviet Russia, travels to America to find him.

It was followed by Yes (2004), with Joan Allen, Simon Abkarian and Sam Neill. Yes was written in response to the attacks in the United States of 11 September 2001; it is considered Potter's return to more experimental methods of filmmaking. The screenplay is written in verse and the film's budget was much smaller than that for The Man Who Cried. Regarding the film's budget and stylistic approaches, Potter said:

Originally I was trying to figure out how we could shoot this film without any lights, because there didn't seem to be enough money in the budget to have any. One solution was to shoot at six frames a second, or even three. Later you print each frame four (or eight) times to bring it into sync at twenty-four frames per second. You can shoot almost in the dark, and still see people's faces ... we did some tests and found that it was very beautiful; so I decided to make it part of the language of the film.

In 2007, Potter directed Georges Bizet's Carmen for English National Opera at the London Coliseum, starring Alice Coote and designed by Es Devlin.

Rage (2009) became the first feature-length film to premiere on mobile devices. The cast includes Judi Dench, Steve Buscemi, Lily Cole and Jude Law. Rage was in competition at the Berlin Film Festival in 2009 and nominated for a WEBBY for Best Drama in 2010.

Potter's seventh feature film entitled Ginger & Rosa was written and directed by Potter and produced by Christoper Sheppard and Andrew Lityin. The film starred Elle Fanning and Alice Englert as the title characters and received its premiere at the Telluride Film Festival. The film went into limited release in the UK in 2012, before enjoying a limited run in North America in early 2013.

In 2017, Potter's black comedy The Party was released. It was selected to compete for the Golden Bear in the main competition section of the 67th Berlin International Film Festival and was awarded the Guild Film Prize. The film features a star-studded ensemble cast with Patricia Clarkson, Bruno Ganz, Emily Mortimer, Cherry Jones, Cillian Murphy, Kristin Scott Thomas and Timothy Spall.

In 2020, Potter's drama The Roads Not Taken was released after a world premiere at the Berlin International Film Festival, where it was nominated for the Golden Bear. It follows Molly (Elle Fanning) caring for her father, Leo (Javier Bardem), who has early-onset dementia. In an interview at Berlinale, Potter described the research process involved in providing an accurate and sensitive portrayal of Leo's illness:

Although my brother had a variant of it and I had already done a lot of research into it, I consulted a neurologist to make sure that everything was clinically correct. Javier Bardem also did his own research and visited a clinic for people with that particular variant of dementia. And he discovered what I knew, that it can take so many different forms and pathways. Most people think dementia is Alzheimer's, but Alzheimer's is just one variation of dementia.

== Filmography ==
Short film

Year	Title	Notes
1969	Jerk	
1970	Hors d'oeuvres	
1970	Black & White	
1970	Play	
1979	Thriller	At Women Make Movies.
1986	London Story	At Women Make Movies.
2022	Look At Me	

Feature film

Year	Title	Ref.
1983	The Gold Diggers	
1992	Orlando	
1997	The Tango Lesson	
2000	The Man Who Cried	
2004	Yes	
2009	Rage	
2012	Ginger & Rosa	
2017	The Party	
2020	The Roads Not Taken	

Documentary film

- Tears, Laughter, Fear & Rage (1986)
- I Am An Ox, I Am A Horse, I Am A Man, I Am A Woman (1988)

== Discography ==
Studio albums

- Pink Bikini (2023)
- Anatomy (2025)

== Awards and honours ==
Year	Award	Category	Title	Result	Ref.
1984	Berlin Film Festival	Reader Jury of the "Zitty"	The Gold Diggers	Won	
1987	Berlin Film Festival	Golden Bear	The London Story	Nominated	
1992	Venice Film Festival	Golden Lion	Orlando	Nominated	
1992	Venice Film Festival	Golden Ciak	Orlando	Nominated	
1992	Venice Film Festival	Elvira Notari Prize	Orlando	Won	
1992	Venice Film Festival	OCIC Award	Orlando	Won	
1993	Independent Spirit Award	Best International Film	Orlando	Nominated	
1993	European Film Awards	Young European Film of the Year	Orlando	Won	
1993	San Francisco International Film Festival	Satyajit Ray Award	Orlando	Won	
1992	Thessaloniki International Film Festival	FIPRESCI	Orlando	Won	
1992	Thessaloniki International Film Festival	Golden Alexander	Orlando	Won	
1992	Thessaloniki International Film Festival	Special Artistic Achievement	Orlando	Won	
1997	Mar del Plata International Film Festival	Best Film	The Tango Lesson	Won	
2000	Venice Film Festival	Golden Lion	The Man Who Cried	Nominated	
2005	Brisbane International Film Festival	Special Commendation	Yes	Won	
2005	Emden International Film Festival	Emden Film Award	Yes	Nominated	
2009	Berlin International Film Festival	Golden Bear	Rage	Nominated	
2009	Women Film Critics Circle	Best Woman Storyteller	Rage	Nominated	
2012	BFI London Film Festival	Best Film	Ginger and Rosa	Nominated	
2012	Valladolid International Film Festival	Best Film	Ginger and Rosa	Nominated	
2012	Abu Dhabi Film Festival	Best Narrative Feature	Ginger and Rosa	Nominated	
2012	Tallinn Black Nights Film Festival	Special Mention	Ginger and Rosa	Won	
2017	Berlin International Film Festival	Guild Film Prize	The Party	Won	
2017	Berlin International Film Festival	Golden Bear	The Party	Nominated	
2017	Melbourne International Film Festival	People's Choice Award	The Party	3rd Place	
2017	Valladolid International Film Festival	Rainbow Spike	The Party	Won	
2017	Valladolid International Film Festival	Golden Spike	The Party	Nominated	
2019	Alliance of Women Film Journalists	EDA Female Focus Award	The Party	Nominated	
2019	Goya Awards	Best European Film	The Party	Nominated	
2020	Berlin International Film Festival	Golden Bear	The Roads Not Taken	Nominated	

- Sally Potter had career retrospectives of her film and video work at the BFI Southbank, London, and Filmoteca, Madrid, in 2009, and MoMA, New York, in 2010.
- She was appointed Officer of the Order of the British Empire (OBE) in the 2012 Birthday Honours for services to film.
