= En+ Group =

Russian energy and metals company

En+ Group plc
- Type: Public limited company
- Traded as: LSE: ENPL; MCX: ENPG
- Industry: energy and metals
- Founded: 2002 (Moscow)
- Headquarters: Moscow, Russia (Head office); Kaliningrad, Russia (Registered office)
- Number of locations: 3
- Key people: Vladimir Kolmogorov (CEO)
- Revenue: $10.36 billion (2020)
- Net income: $1.86 billion (2020)
- Number of employees: Approximately 90,000 (2022)
- Website: www.enplusgroup.com/en/

En+ Group plc is a green energy and metals company. It has a controlling stake in Rusal, one of the world's largest aluminum producers outside of China. EN+ was founded by Oleg Deripaska

By using hydroelectricity to power its smelters, EN+ Group’s manufacturing process generates 80% less emissions than coal-burning manufacturers in China. The company has set ambitious goals for achieving net-zero emissions in the production of “green aluminum." The company is the world's largest independent hydropower generator.

EN+ is led by Vladimir Kolmogorov. In 2020, the company reported revenues of $10.36 billion and a net income of $1.86 billion. It is publicly traded and listed on the London Stock Exchange.

== History ==
2002: En+ Group established.

2003: RUSAL Holding Limited established following a corporate restructuring and consolidation of aluminium and alumina assets. These assets would later form the group of companies that now compose UC RUSAL. The consolidation of RUSAL Holding Limited was completed in 2004, 100% of its shares were transferred to En+ Group.

2001 – 2007: The Group acquired 50.2% of the shares of Irkutskenergo, a power company that owns the Irkutsk, Bratsk and Ust-Ilimsk HPPs and several CHPs in the Irkutsk region of Russia, with an aggregate generation capacity of 12.8 GW. In 2016 the Group increased its shareholding to 90.8%.

2005: purchase of Aluminium Plant Podgorica by subsidiary Salomon Enterprises Limited, which was later renamed Central European Aluminum Company (CEAC)

2007: Following the acquisitions of SUAL Group by En+ Group, which at the time was one of the ten largest aluminium producers globally, and select aluminium and alumina businesses from Glencore, the current RUSAL was formed under UC RUSAL.

2008: UC RUSAL completes the acquisition of a 25% + 1 shares stake in Norilsk Nickel, the world's second largest producer of Nickel and one of the world's leading producers of platinum and copper.

2010: UC UC RUSAL conducts initial public offering of shares and depositary receipts in Hong Kong.

2011: En+ establishes En+ logistics, to provide logistics services predominantly to its Energy Segment.

2013: As relationship between the CEAC and the Government of Montenegro became increasingly sour, there was an ongoing debate within the country about the fate of the aluminum producer. The size of the company, number of employees, and its impact on the Montenegrin trade balance imply that efforts will be made by the Government to keep the company alive, although sustainable ownership and management arrangements are yet to be made given the recriminations. On 8 July 2013, the CEAC officially went bankrupt, having up to that point accumulated a debt of 383 million euros, while the company itself is worth 180 million euros.

2014: Boguchansk HPP initiated operations (as part of the BEMO 50/50 joint venture between UC RUSAL and RusHydro).

2016: The first half of the first stage of the Boguchansk aluminium smelter (as part of the BEMO 50/50 joint venture between UC RUSAL and RusHydro) began operations with a production capacity of 149 thousand tonnes.

2017: En+ successfully lists on the London Stock Exchange, raising $1.5 billion from international investors, valuing the company at $8 billion. The IPO was largest Russian IPO globally since 2012 and the first IPO by a Russian company in London since 2014.

2021: En+ Group’s Metals segment RUSAL announced its proposal to demerge its high carbon assets and to change its name to AL+. Mubadala, a state-owned investment company in Abu Dhabi, purchased a 2.6% stake in En+ Group from Polina Yumasheva, the former wife of Oleg Deripaska.

== US sanctions on En+ Group ==
In April 2018, the United States Treasury Department's Office of Foreign Assets Control (OFAC) included En+ Group among a list of 38 Russian entities being sanctioned in response to Russian interference in U.S. elections, violence in Ukraine, cybercrimes, and supplying Syria with weapons. Both EN+ Group and RUSAL were included on the list for being owned or controlled by Oleg Deripaska, who was also among the sanctioned entities.

As a result of the sanctions, the U.S. government froze all US assets of EN+ Group and prohibited U.S. persons from doing business with the company.

In response, the chairman of the board of directors of EN+ Group, Rt Hon The Lord Barker of Battle presented a plan aimed at the de-listing of the company from the sanctions’ list by reducing Deripaska’s shareholding interest and creating an independent board of directors. On April 27, the company completed a regulatory filing with the London Stock Exchange stating the Deripaska had agreed to leave the board and reduce his ownership interest to less than 50%.

On May 1, 2018 the US Department of the Treasury loosened the sanctions to allow transactions necessary to divest or transfer debt, equity or other holdings in EN+ Group and United Company RUSAL PLC. The following month, four board members, Gulzhan Moldazhanova, Igor Makarov, Olga Mashkovskaya and Anton Vishnevskiy, resigned as part of the Barker restructuring plan.

On July 21, 2018 US Treasury Secretary Steven Mnuchin said in an interview that the objective was not to put the company out of business, but to limit Oleg Deripaska.

The US Treasury notified Congress about its intention to lift sanctions against En+ Group in December of 2018 following the corporate restructuring. In the announcement lifting the sanctions, Mnuchin said “These companies have committed to significantly diminish Deripaska’s ownership and sever his control,” and noted that the companies would be subject to ongoing compliance and regulation.”

Under the arrangement to lift U.S. sanctions, new independent directors would be appointed to the boards EN+ and Rusal and the companies agreed to not act in any manner that “directly or indirectly provides Deripaska with the ability to exercise a controlling influence over management or policies” of EN+ or Rusal.” Deripaska’s voting interests were reduced to 35%. When Barker announced the agreement in January 2019, he acknowledged it wasn’t perfect. “I am not pretending that Deripaska is removed from the company altogether, but we have removed control."

After sanctions were lifted for En+ Group, Deripaska remained on the OFAC list. All of Deripaska’s property and interests in property, including entities in which he holds a fifty percent or greater interest, remained blocked and he was prevented from obtaining cash either in return for his shares or from future dividends issued by En+ or Rusal.

== Demerger of RUSAL ==
EN+’s RUSAL business unit announced a plan in May 2021 to split itself into two companies, separating its high-carbon products from its low-carbon products. The low-carbon company will be called AL+ and was expected to keep 60% of its aluminum production and 70% of its alumina production assets. The high carbon assets will include five aluminum smelters, fours alumina refineries, and two bauxite mines.

The move to demerge the company’s high and low carbon producing assets was part of a larger plan to reach net-zero carbon emissions by 2050. The net-zero plan, announced in January 2021, would reduce the company’s greenhouse gas emissions by 35% by 2030 and put EN+ in compliance with the Paris Agreement and the European Green Deal. Chief operating officer Vyacheslav Solomin leads the company’s Climate Change Taskforce.

In late 2021, RUSAL opened the Taishet Aluminum Smelter, its first low-carbon aluminum facility. The plant, located in Siberia, runs exclusively on hydropower and is expected to produce 428,000 metric tons of aluminum each year.

== Leadership and Governance ==
In November 2018, Vladimir Kiryukhin was appointed as CEO of EN+ Group. Kiryukhin’s predecessor, Vyacheslav Solomin, was named as COO.

In January 2019, a new slate of board members was created consisting of twelve directors with a majority of independent directors. In addition to Chairman Lord Barker, the board has four board seats appointed by Deripaska and eight independent directors: Christopher Burnham, Andrey Sharonov, Carl Hughes, Joan MacNaughton, Timur Valiev, Zhanna Fokina, Thurgood Marshall, Audrey Yanovsky, Vadim Geraskin, and Elena Nesvetaeva.

Following Russia’s 2022 invasion of Ukraine, Barker resigned as chairman along with Joan MacNaughton, a non-executive director. Christopher Bancroft Burnham was appointed chairman in March 2022 to replace Barker.

== Sustainability ==
In January 2021, En+ Group announced a significant emissions reduction target with plans to cut greenhouse gas (GHG) emissions by at least 35% by 2030. The effort also set a goal of achieving net zero GHG emissions by 2050. As part of this clean energy modernization effort, the company began replacing hydraulic units at its Bratsk hydropower plant. The work, which is expected to be completed by 2026, will reduce the group’s greenhouse gas emissions.

Responding to a report that 67 percent of consumers favored carbon-labelling of products, EN+ group chairman Lord Barker went on record suggesting that manufacturers of cans and containers made from green aluminum may respond by labeling the source of the raw material used to produce packaging for their products. EN+ Group subsidiary Rusal signed an agreement in September 2021 with the UK’s Budweiser Brewing Group to produce five million ultra-low carbon beer cans. The cans will be 440ml in size and come from Rusal’s Krasnoyarsk plant in Siberia, which uses hydro-power as fuel.

En+ Group signed an agreement in August 2021 with I-REC Services BV enabling the En+ Group to sell and redeem international renewable energy certificates (I-RECs).

In the fall of 2021, EN+ participated in the United Nations Climate Change Conference (COP26). Greg Barker, then chairman of EN+, attended the event along with eight other members of the EN+ management team.

=== Metals ===
En+ Group holds a 48.1% stake in RUSAL, a vertically-integrated aluminium producer. RUSAL accounted for approximately 6.2% of global aluminium output in 2017.

En+ Group's Metals segment operates 10 aluminium smelters and 7 alumina refineries, with its core smelting operations located in Siberia. In addition, UC RUSAL holds a strategic investment in Norilsk Nickel and a 50% interest in the BEMO Project (a joint venture between UC RUSAL and RusHydro comprising Boguchansk HPP and Boguchansk aluminium smelter).

In 2017 En+ Group's Metals segment produced 3,707 thousand tonnes of aluminium, 7,773 thousand tonnes of alumina and 11,645 thousand tonnes of bauxites.

Rusal began producing a low-carbon aluminum brand called Allow in 2017. The material has been reported to have a carbon footprint of less than 8 tons of carbon dioxide per ton of aluminum produced. Rusal has targeted reducing Allow’s carbon footprint to a level of less than 2 tons of carbon dioxide per ton of aluminum.

==== Key assets of the En+ Group Metals segment ====
Aluminium smelters
Country	Name	Location	Start of operations	Production capacity (ktpa)
Russia	Krasnoyarsk Aluminium Smelter	Krasnoyarsk	1964	1019
Russia	Bratsk Aluminium Smelter	Bratsk	1966	1008
Russia	Boguchansk Aluminium Smelter	Taezhny town	2016	588
Russia	Irkutsk Aluminium Smelter	Shelekhov	1962	529
Russia	Sayanogorsk Aluminium Smelter	Sayanogorsk	1985	524
Russia	Novokuznetsk Aluminium Smelter	Novokuznetsk	1943	322
Russia	Khakass Aluminum Smelter	Sayanogorsk	2006	297
Russia	Volgograd Aluminium Smelter	Volgograd	1959	168
Russia	Kandalaksha Aluminium Smelter	Kandalaksha	1951	76
Sweden	Kubikenborg	Sundsvall	1943	128

Alumina refineries
Country	Name	Location	Start of operations	Production capacity (mtpa)
Russia	Achinsk Alumina Refinery	Achinsk	1970	1,1
Russia	Bogoslovsk Aluminium Smelter	Krasnoturyinsk	1944	1,052
Russia	Urals Aluminum Smelter	Kamensk-Uralsky	1939	0,768
Australia	Queensland Alumina Ltd (20%)	Gladstone	1967	4,058
Ireland	Aughinish Alumina	Aughinish island	1983	1,990
Jamaica	Windalco	Jamaica	1953	1,21
Guinea	Friguia Bauxite and Alumina Complex	Fria	1960	0,65

Bauxite production sites
Country	Name	Location	Start of operations	Production capacity (ktpa)
Russia	North Urals Bauxite Mine	Severouralsk	1938	3,0
Russia	Timan Bauxite	Ukhta	1992	3,2
Guinea	Compagnie des Bauxites de Kindia	Kindia	1974	3,4
Guinea	Friguia Alumina Complex	Fria	1960	2,1
Guyana	Bauxite Company of Guyana Inc	Georgetown	2004	1,7

=== Energy ===
En+ Group operates generating assets with 19.6 GW of installed electricity capacity. As of 31 December 2016, hydro power plants accounted for 76.6% (15.1 GW) of the Group's installed electricity capacity, which makes the Company the largest privately held hydro power generation company globally. As at 31 December 2016, the Group held an 8% share of the total installed electricity capacity in Russia.

The Group's power assets are predominantly located in Siberia, where it has a 37.6% share of total installed electricity capacity in the region. The hydro power operations benefit from the abundant water resources of the Angara and Yenisei river cascades. These plants provide sustainable, low carbon and low-cost power for Russian industrial facilities, including Metals segment's core aluminium smelters. The Group believes that it benefits from lower operating costs compared to other hydro power generation companies in part due to the geographic location, scale and efficient management of the power generating assets.

En+ Group's Energy segment is a member of the Global Sustainable Electricity Partnership, a non-profit organisation whose members are the world's leading electricity companies, supplying energy to over 1.2 billion customers.

In 2017, En+ Group produced 68.4TWh of electricity and 26.7mn Gcal of heat.

==== Key assets of the En+ Group Energy segment ====
Hydropower plants
Country	Name	Location	Start of operations	Installed capacity (MW)
Russia	Krasnoyarsk HPP	Divnogorsk	1972 —	6000
Russia	Bratsk HPP	Bratsk	1966 —	4500
Russia	Ust-Ilimsk HPP	Ust-Ilimsk	1980 —	3840
Russia	Irkutsk HPP	Irkutsk	1956 —	662

Combined heat plants
Country	Name	Location	Start of operations	Installed capacity (MW)
Russia	CHP-10	Angarsk	1959	1100
Russia	CHP-9	Angarsk	1963	540
Russia	Novo-Irkutsk CHP	Irkutsk	1975	708
Russia	Ust-Ilimsk CHP	Ust-Ilimsk	1978	515
Russia	CHP-11	Usolye-Sibirskoye	1959	350
Russia	CHP-6	Bratsk	1965	270
Russia	Novo-Ziminskaya CHP	Sayansk	1980	260
Russia	Avtozavodskaya CHP	Nizhny Novgorod	1931	580

== Renewables ==
In 2015 En+ Group commenced the operations of the Abakan solar power plant. Its installed capacity is 5.2 MW, which makes it the largest solar power plant of Eastern Siberia.

== Key figures ==
Financial data (in USD billions)
Year	9M2018	9M2017	FY2017	FY2016
Revenue	9,434	8,716	12,094	9,776
Adjusted EBITDA	2,618	2,316	3,223	2,311
Net profit	1,623	898	1,403	1,361

Operational highlights
	Measurement unit	9M2018	9M2017	FY2017	FY2016
Aluminium production	Tonnes, 000	2,810	2,762	3,707	3,685
Primary aluminium and alloy sales	Tonnes, 000	2,794	2,955	3,955	3,818
Alumina production	Tonnes, 000	5,816	5,782	7,773	7,527
Bauxite production	Tonnes, 000	10,128	8,701	11,645	12,187
Total electricity generation	TWh	53,2	50,4	68,4	69,5
Total heat generation	Gcal, 000	18,4	17,5	26,7	27,4
