= Stroitel =

Stroitel may refer to:

Places

- Stroitel Urban Settlement, a municipal formation which the town of Stroitel and three rural localities in Yakovlevsky District of Belgorod Oblast, Russia are incorporated as
- Stroitel (inhabited locality), several inhabited localities in Russia

Sports

- Stroitel Stadium (Soligorsk), a multi-purpose stadium in Salihorsk, Belarus
- FC Stroitel Morshansk, a soccer club based in Morshansk, Russia
- FC Stroitel Pripyat, a soccer club based in Pripyat, Ukraine
- FC Stroitel Vitebsk, a soccer club based in Vitebsk, Belarus
- Stroitel Syktyvkar, a bandy club based in Syktyvkar, Russia
- FC Stroitel Cherepovets, name of FC Bulat Cherepovets, a former soccer club based in Cherepovets, Russia, in 1979–1988
- FC Stroitel Kurgan, name of FC Tobol Kurgan, a soccer club based in Kurgan, Russia, in 1960–1964
- FC Stroitel Saransk, name of FC Mordovia Saransk, a soccer club based in Saransk, Russia, in 1961
- FC Stroitel Starye Dorogi, name of FC Starye Dorogi, a soccer club based in Staryya Darohi, Belarus, in 1987–2000
- FC Stroitel Temirtau, name of FC Bolat, a soccer club based in Temirtau, Kazakhstan, in 1969–1977
- FC Stroitel Tyumen, former name of FC Tyumen, a soccer club based in Tyumen, Russia
- FC Stroitel Ufa, name of FC Neftyanik Ufa, a soccer club based in Ufa, Russia, in 1959–1976, 1997, and 1999–2003
- FC Stroitel Vladikavkaz, name of FC Spartak Vladikavkaz, a former soccer club based in Vladikavkaz, Russia, in 1992
- Stroitel Karagandy, name of Avtomobilist Karagandy, an ice hockey club based in Karaganda, Kazakhstan, in 1993–1995
- Stroitel Temirtau, name of Bulat Temirtau, a former ice hockey club based in Temirtau, Kazakhstan, in 1960–1990
- Stroitel, former name of Lesokhimik, a bandy club in Ust-Ilimsk, Russia
- Stroitel, nickname of BC Budivelnyk, a basketball club based in Kyiv, Ukraine
