= Irkutskenergo =

- Company type: Public (OAO)
- Traded as: MCX: IRGZ
- Industry: Power generation
- Founded: 1992
- Headquarters: Irkutsk, Russia
- Area served: Irkutsk Oblast
- Key people: Evgeny Fedorov, General Director; Evgeny Filsh, First Deputy General Director Director for Finance and Economics
- Products: Heat and electric power
- Revenue: $1.46 billion (2017)
- Operating income: $356 million (2016)
- Net income: $228 million (2016)
- Total assets: $2.28 billion (2016)
- Total equity: $614 million (2016)
- Parent: EuroSibEnergo (En+ Group)
- Website: en.irkutskenergo.ru

Irkutskenergo (MCX: IRGZ) is a power company in Russia. It mainly focus on the generation of hydroelectricity.

The company's hydroelectric facilities are located on the Angara River: Irkutsk, Bratsk, and Ust-Ilimsk hydroelectric power plants. In addition, the company owns 13 coal-fired combined heat and power plants. The total installed capacity of Irkutskenergo is 12,879.9 MW of electric power and 13,002 Gcal/hour of thermal power.

== Ownership ==
Irkutskenergo is controlled by EuroSibEnergo, a subsidiary of Oleg Deripaska owned En+ Group, which owns a 90.8% share in the company. The rest of shares is traded on the Moscow Exchange.

Inter RAO previously owned 40% of shares. RusHydro had shown its interest to acquire stake owned by Inter RAO.

== See also ==
- Bratsk hydroelectric plant
