= Ilimsk =

Village in Russia

Coordinates: 56°46′18″N 103°47′10″E

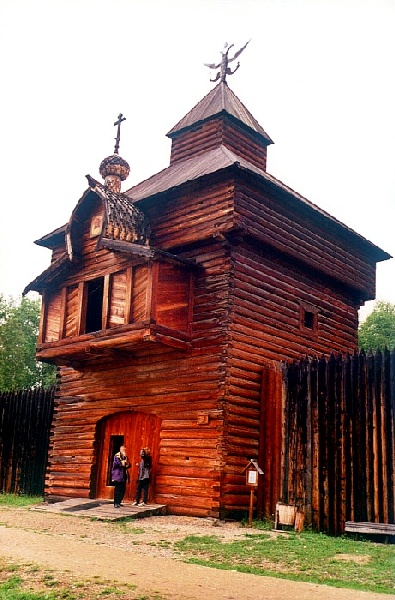
The Spasskya Tower of the Ilimsk Ostrog in the Taltsy Museum near Irkutsk

Ilimsk (Russian: Илимск) was a small town in Siberia, within today's Irkutsk Oblast of Russia. The town was flooded by the Ust-Ilimsk Reservoir in the mid-1970s.

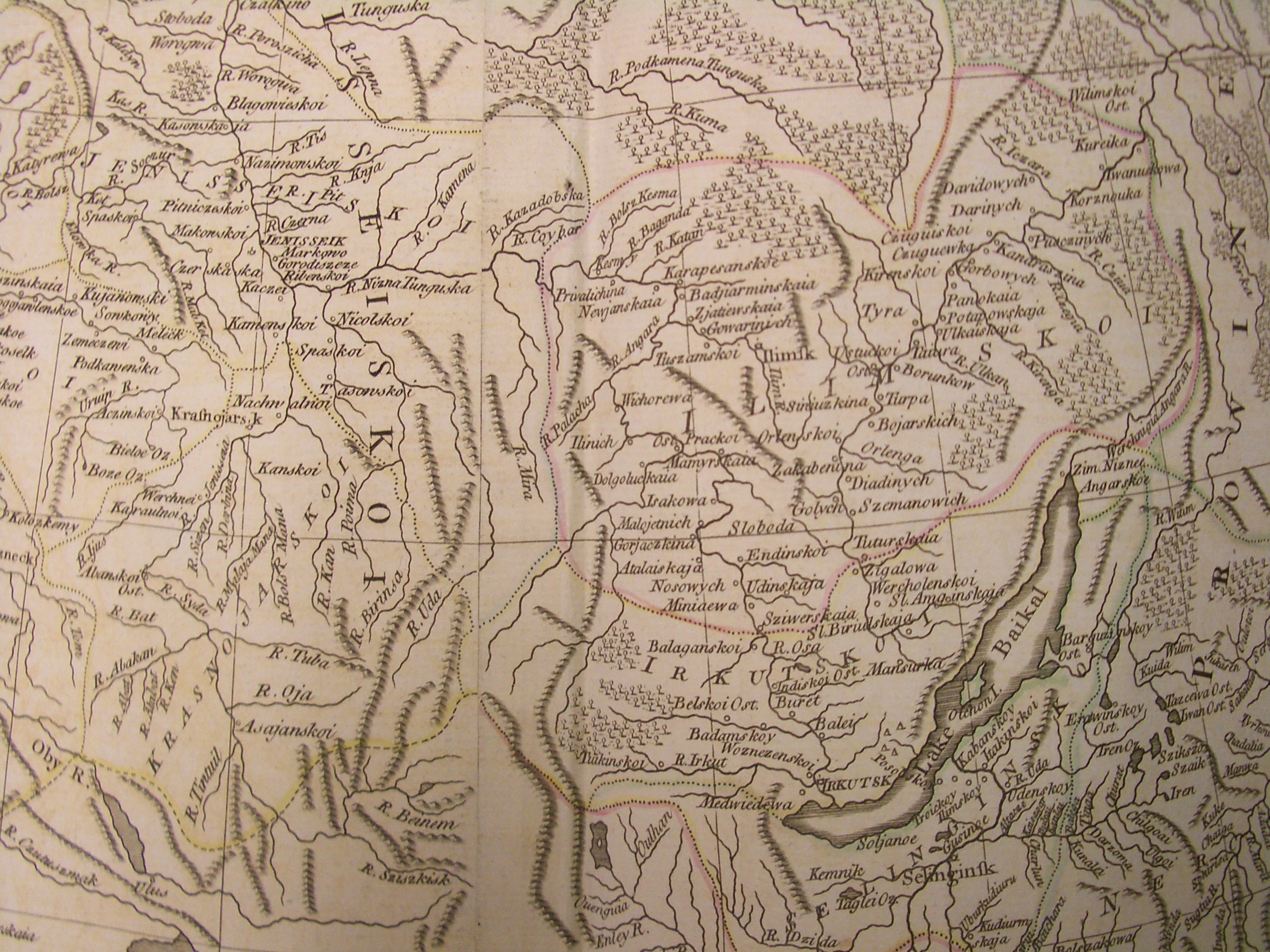
Ilimsk, the center of the large Ilimsky (Ilimskoi) Okrug (District) in a 1773 atlas of the world. The District occupied roughly the northern half of today's Irkutsk Oblast

Ilimsk was founded in 1630 on the Ilim River, a tributary of the Angara River, as Ilimsky Ostrog (i.e., "Fort Ilim"). From here a portage ran east to the Kuta River which joins the Lena River at Ust-Kut, thereby allowing travel from the Yenisei River basin to that of the Lena River. In early times the Ilimsk Uyezd was one of the few grain-producing areas in Siberia. Around 1700 there were 280 settlements, including seven ostrogs. In 1745 there were 7,605 peasants. Much of the grain was shipped down the Lena to feed the Okhotsk Coast and other areas in eastern Siberia. Grain production shifted south as the area around Irkutsk became more settled. From 1764 to 1775 the town was the administrative center of a district (okrug) and had population of around 700 by the end of the 19th century.

Alexander Radishchev was exiled to Ilimsk between 1792 and 1796. His wife had died, and her sister joined Radishchev in Ilimsk, bringing his younger children with her. Radishchev later married her, while still in Ilimsk.

After the October Revolution of 1917, Ilimsk became a village (selo). In the mid 1970s, after the construction of the Ust-Ilimsk Dam (Russian: Усть-Илимская ГЭС) on the Angara at Ust-Ilimsk (below the fall of the Ilim into the Angara), the site of the village was flooded by the Ust-Ilimsk Reservoir.

Before the site was flooded, archaeological excavations were carried out in the village during 1967–75; the Spasskaya Tower and the Church of Our Lady of Kazan from the old ostrog (wooden fort) were taken apart and moved to the Taltsy Museum (Russian: Тальцы), an open-air museum of traditional architecture near Irkutsk. In the early 2000s, an exact copy of another tower of the former Ilimsk ostrog and the southern wall of the fortress were built at the Taltsy site next to the buildings moved from Ilimsk, thus recreating a large portion of the historic fortified town within easy reach from Irkutsk.
