= Ilim =

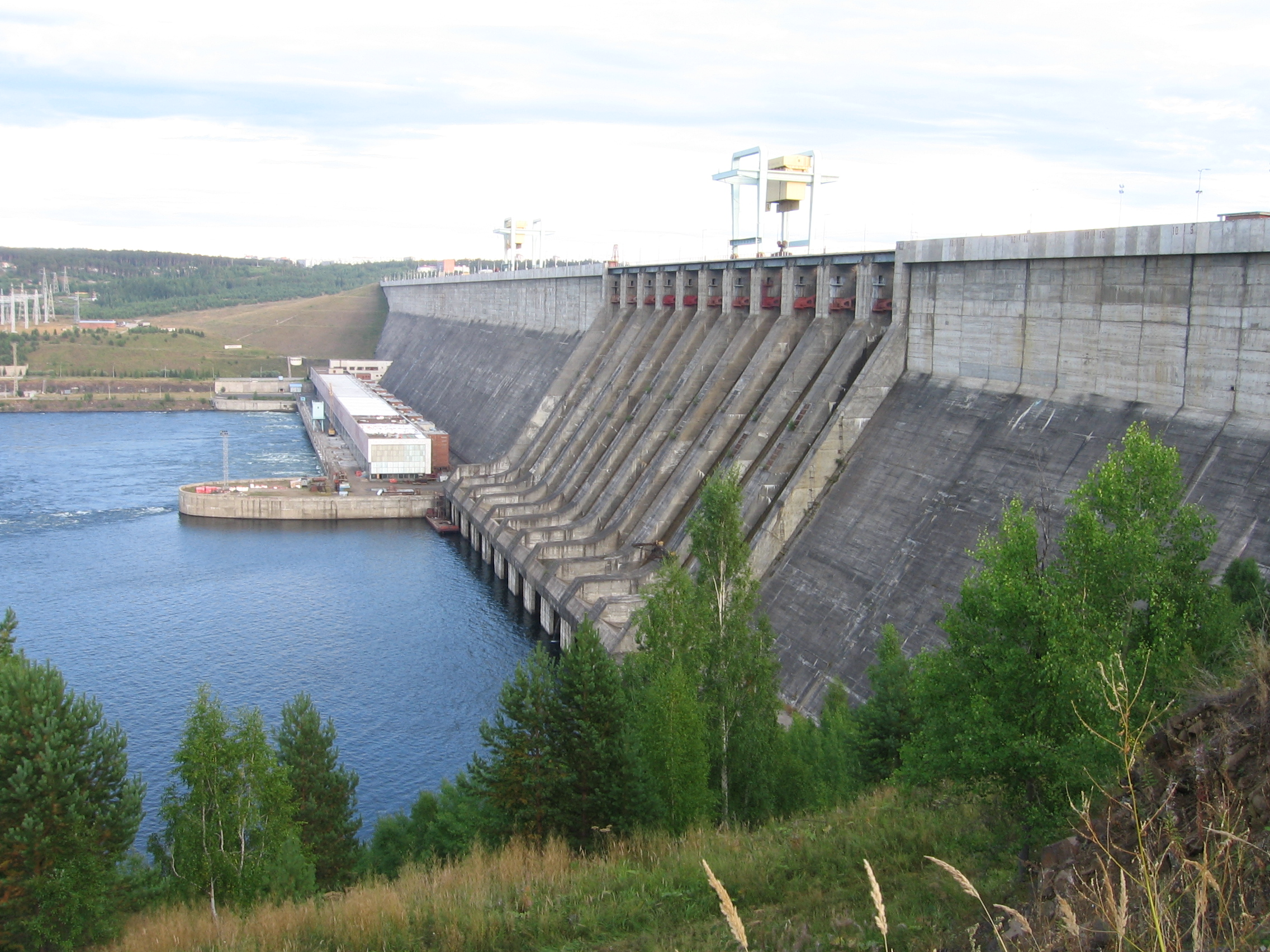

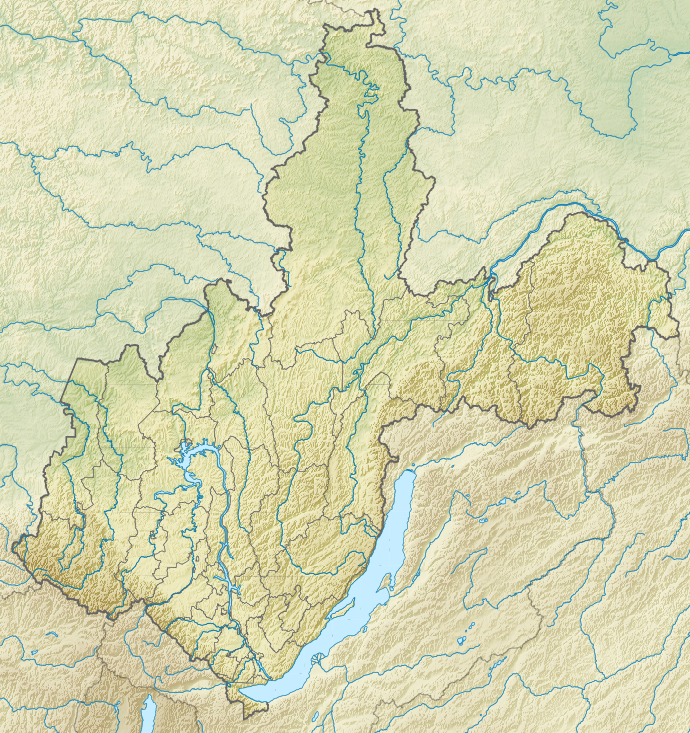
- Mouth location in Irkutsk Oblast, Russia

Location
- Country: Russia

Physical characteristics
- Mouth: Angara
  - coordinates: 57°39′40″N 102°34′49″E
- Length: 589 km (366 mi)
- Basin size: 30,300 km^{2} (11,700 sq mi)

Basin features
- Progression: Angara→ Yenisey→ Kara Sea

The Ilim (Russian: Илим) is a river in Irkutsk Oblast in Russia, a right tributary of the Angara. It flows north between and parallel to the rivers Angara and Lena, and then swings west to join the Angara 40 kilometres (25 mi) south of Ust-Ilimsk.

== Geography ==
The Ust-Ilimsk Dam on the Angara (downstream from the older, bigger, and better known Bratsk Dam), completed in the mid-1970s, not only backs up the Angara, but also the Ilim as far as Zheleznogorsk-Ilimsky. The site of the old town of Ilimsk was flooded by the reservoir.

The Ilim is 589 kilometres (366 mi) long, and its basin covers 30,300 square kilometres (11,700 mi^{2}). The river freezes up in late October and stays icebound until early May. Its main tributaries are the Kochenga and the Tuba from the right, and the Chora from the left.

== See also ==
- Siberian River Routes
