= Kitoy =

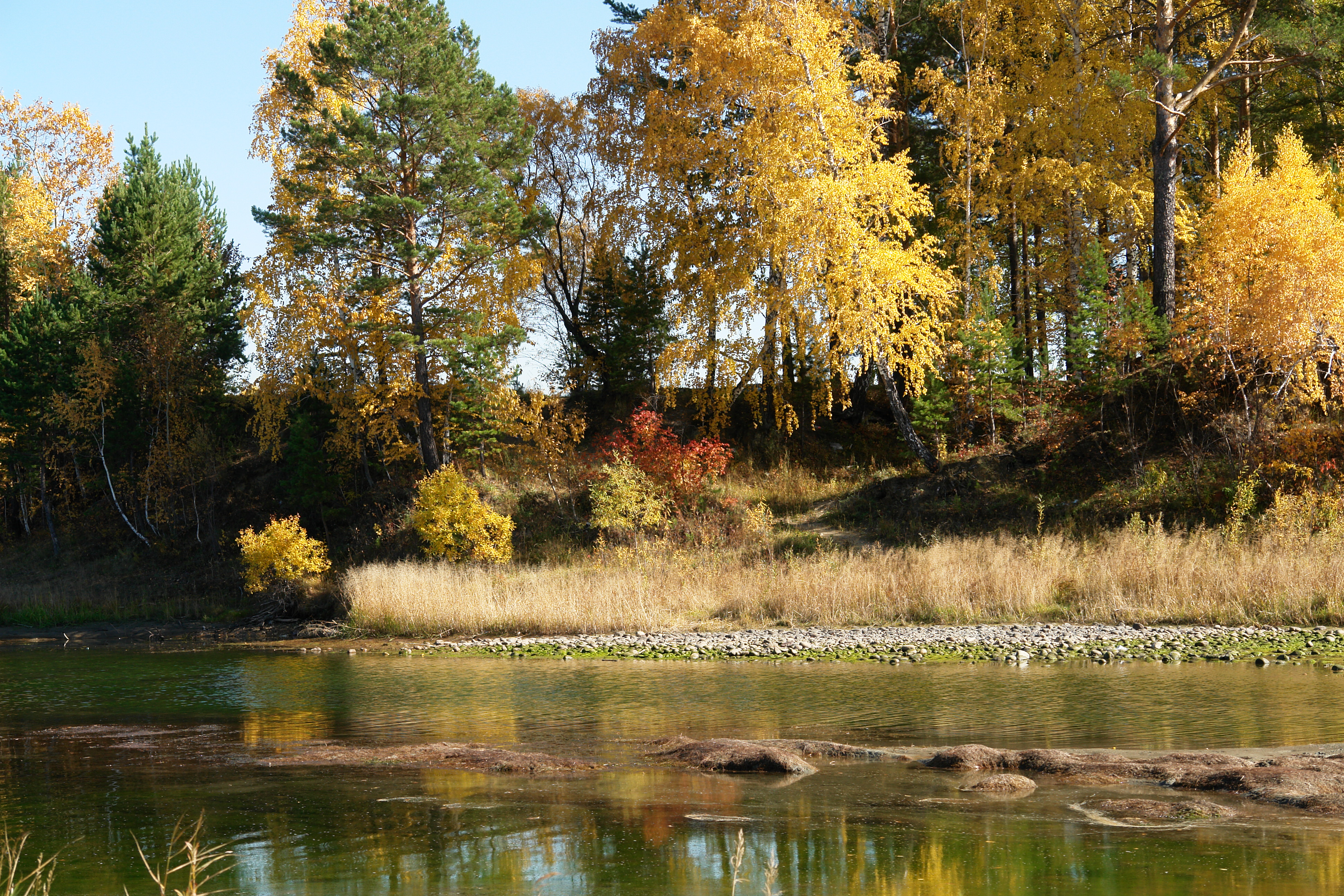

Location
- Country: Russia

Physical characteristics
- Mouth: Angara
  - coordinates: 52.6539°N 103.8990°E
- Length: 316 km (196 mi)
- Basin size: 9,190 km^{2} (3,550 sq mi)

Basin features
- Progression: Angara→ Yenisey→ Kara Sea

The Kitoy (Russian: Китой, Buryat: Хути, romanized: Khuti) is a river in Buryatia and Irkutsk Oblast in Russia, a left tributary of the Angara. The length of the river is 316 km. The area of its basin is 9,190 km². The Kitoy freezes up in the second half of October and stays icebound until late April through early May. The city of Angarsk is located on the Kitoy.
