= Mura (Angara) =

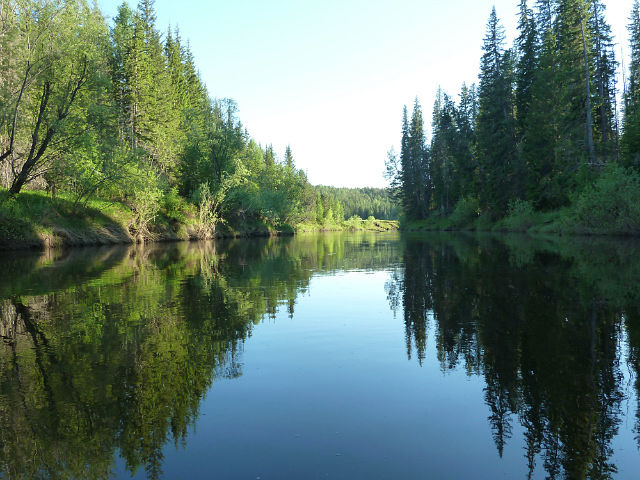

Location
- Country: Russia

Physical characteristics
- Mouth: Angara
  - coordinates: 58.4486°N 98.5642°E
- Length: 330 km (210 mi)
- Basin size: 10,800 km^{2} (4,200 sq mi)

Basin features
- Progression: Angara→ Yenisey→ Kara Sea

The Mura (Russian: Мура) is a river in Irkutsk Oblast and Krasnoyarsk Krai, Russia. It is a left tributary of the Angara. It is 330 kilometres (210 mi) long, and has a drainage basin of 10,800 square kilometres (4,200 sq mi).
