= Irkutsk Hydroelectric Power Station =

Irkutsk Dam
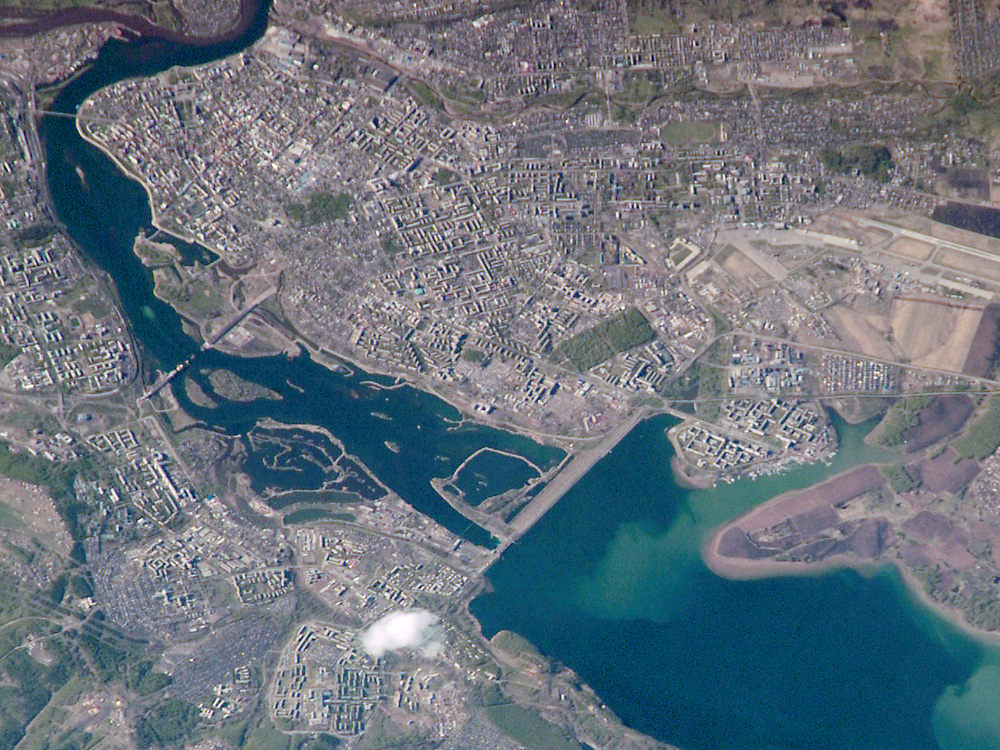
- Irkutsk Dam and the city of Irkutsk

- Location within Russia
- Official name: Irkutsk Hydroelectric Power Station
- Location: Irkutsk, Irkutsk Oblast, Russia
- Coordinates: 52°14′34″N 104°19′43″E
- Construction began: 1950
- Opening date: June 1956
- Owner: Irkutskenergo

Dam and spillways
- Type of dam: Rock-fill, embankment
- Impounds: Angara River
- Height: 44 m (144 ft)
- Length: 2,740 m (8,990 ft)
- Width (base): 225 m (738 ft)

Reservoir
- Creates: Irkutsk Reservoir and heightens Lake Baikal

Power Station
- Commission date: December 1956
- Hydraulic head: 31 m (102 ft)
- Turbines: 4×107.5, 4×82.8
- Installed capacity: 761.2 MW
- Annual generation: 4.1 TWh (15 PJ)

The Irkutsk Hydroelectric Power Station (Irkutsk HPS) is a rock-fill dam on the Angara River with an adjacent hydroelectric power station. It is located adjacent to Irkutsk, Irkutsk Oblast in Russia and is the first dam on the Angara cascades. Construction on the dam began in 1950, its reservoir began filling in 1956 and its first turbines were also commissioned in 1956. It was the first large hydroelectric power station constructed in Eastern Siberia and its completion was hailed by the Soviets as an engineering success.

== History ==
=== Background ===
Complex studies to develop the Angara River began in 1930 as part of a large effort for economic development along the river. In 1935, the research stage of the study was complete and recommended a hydroelectric power plant at the top of the Angara for industrial consumption. In 1936, the State Plan of the USSR reviewed the results and determined that six hydroelectric power stations in a cascade should be built on the river, the Irkutsk being the first. After further studies, designs and authorizations, the project was approved in 1949.

=== Construction ===
Construction on the Irkutsk HPS began in February 1950 and was conducted by Angaragesstroy with Anton Melnikonis managing. Andrey Efimovich Bochkin served as the Chief of Angaragesstroy and Sergey Nikandrovich Moiseyev was appointed Chief Engineer. At the time, such a large rock-fill dam was unprecedented in the world and brought difficulties in designing and construction. Earthquakes in the area could reach a magnitude of 8, so the dam needed to be earth-fill and packed firmly. In addition, the cold temperatures and flooding of the river made construction and concrete settling difficult. In June 1954, the foundation stone for the dam was laid and concrete pouring began soon after. On July 7, 1956, the river was cut off to allow the filling of the Irkutsk Dam's reservoir and on December 29 of that same year, its first generator began to produce electricity. By December 31, a second generator was operational.

Within seven years, the reservoir behind the dam was filled and it had raised Lake Baikal by 1.4 m (4.6 ft). A total of 138,600 hectares of land were inundated by the reservoir, forcing 200 communities and 17,000 people to relocate. By 1958, the last two generators in the HPS were operational ahead of schedule and it was accepted by the state in 1959.

== Power station ==
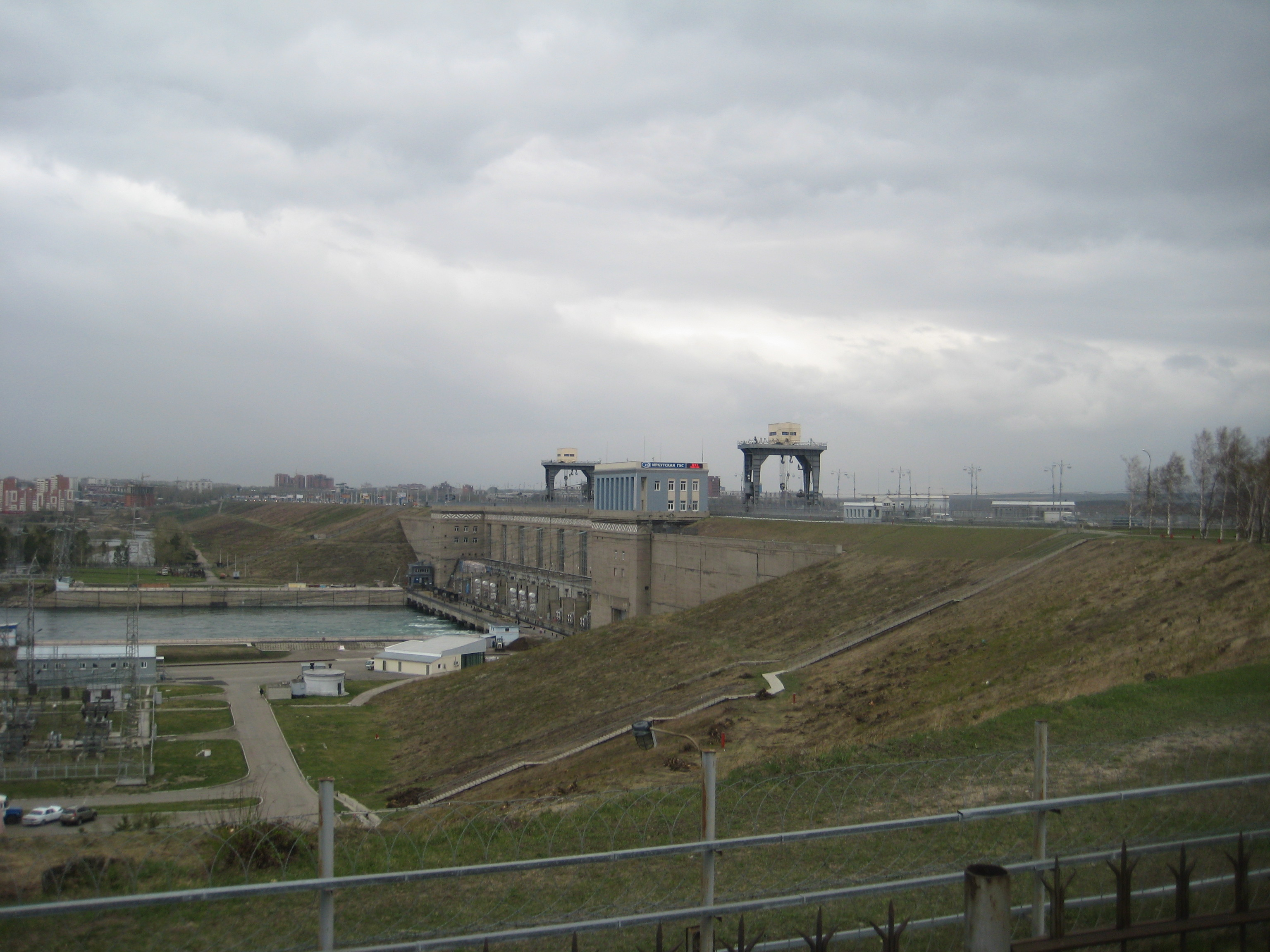
Hydroelectric power station

The power station is contained in a 240 m (790 ft) long, 77 m (253 ft) wide and 56 m (184 ft) high reinforced concrete building. It consists of 8 generators, 5 rated at 82.8 MW and 3 at 107.5 MW, for a total of 736.5 MW. Since first operation, the station has produced 192 billion kWh of electricity and an average of 4.1 billion kWh a year. Power is supplied to the Irkutsk Aluminum Factory in Shelekhov and local areas for residential use. In 1993, a modernization and rehabilitation of the power station was authorized. The work includes replacing the stators on seven of the turbines and a complete replacement of generator No. 5. Relays, switches and transformers are also being replaced and the work is expected to be complete by 2010.

== Soviet legacy ==
After the HPS's first operation, G.M. Krzhizhanovsky, who wrote the Plan of Russian State Electrification Committee, exclaimed that "Start-up of the Irkutsk Hydroelectric Power Station is the great holiday for the Soviet power industry. The Irkutsk Hydroelectric Power Station opened a new epoch in development of electrification of the country." Another academic, A.V. Vinter, congratulated the construction team with "The old dream of the Soviet engineers came true: Baikal and Angara is a Siberian miracle, a pearl of the Soviet water-power engineering, and now it started working for the people." In 1960, by decree of the Presidium of the Supreme Council of the USSR, 349 workers, engineers and employees including Bochkin were awarded Hero of Socialist Labour medals for the outstanding success of the HPS.

== See also ==
- List of power stations in Russia
