= Lesokhimik =

- City: Ust-Ilimsk, Russia
- Founded: 1975; 50 years ago
- Home arena: Yubileyny Stadium

Lesokhimik (Russian: Лесохимик) is a professional bandy club in Ust-Ilimsk, Russia, founded in 1975. They play their matches at Yubileyny Stadium, with a capacity of 5,000.

The club played in the highest division of the Russian Bandy League between 2004 and 2008. In 2008, they withdrew from the Russian Bandy League due to financial problems and continued in the Russian Bandy Supreme League.
