= Ust-Ilimsk =

Town in Irkutsk Oblast, Russia

Ust-Ilimsk Усть-Илимск
- Town
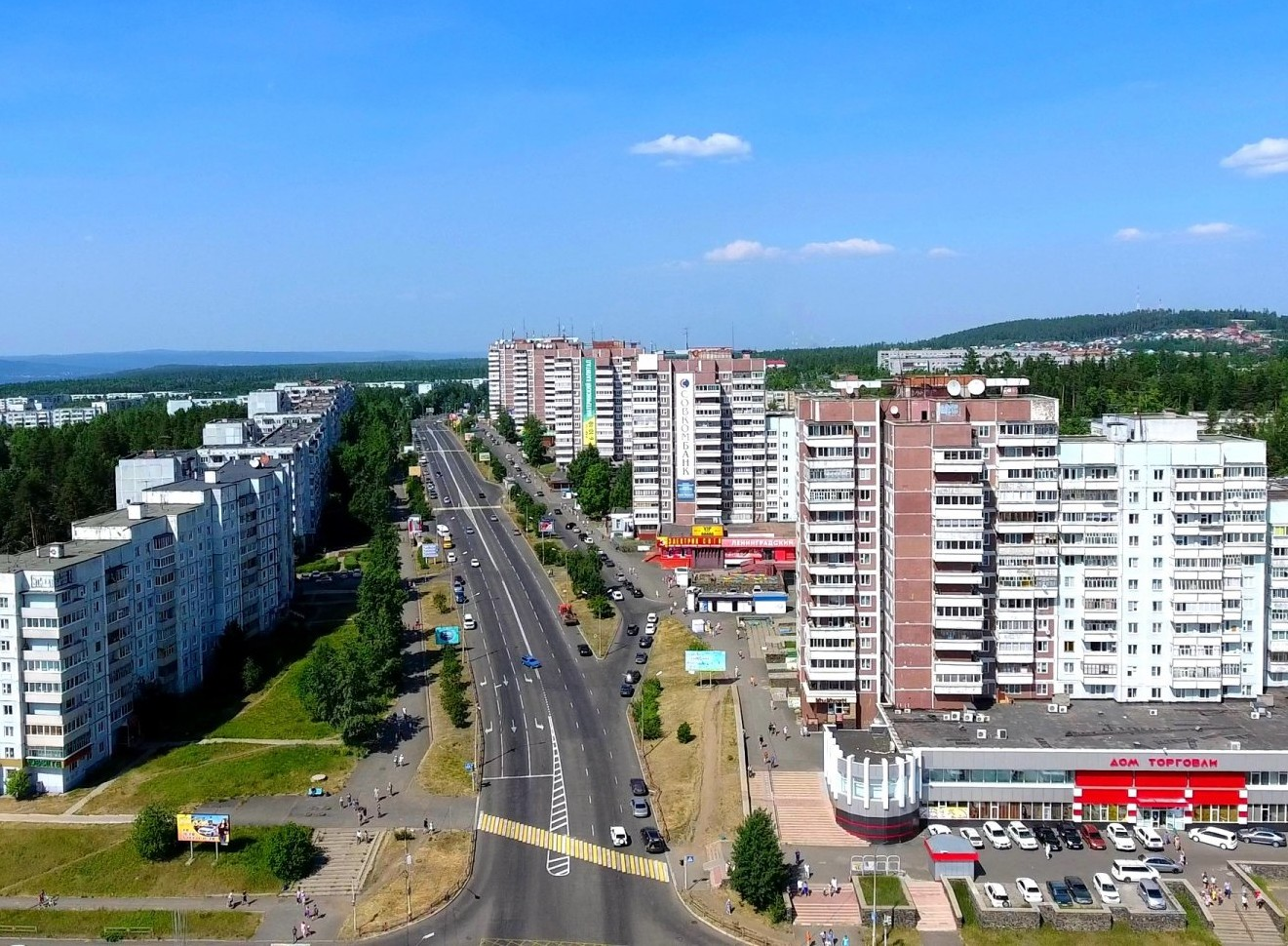
- View of Ust-Ilimsk

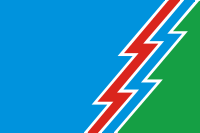
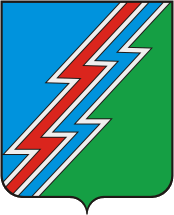
- Flag Coat of arms
- Interactive map of Ust-Ilimsk
- Location of Ust-Ilimsk Ust-Ilimsk (Irkutsk Oblast)
- Coordinates: 58°00′N 102°40′E
- Country: Russia
- Federal subject: Irkutsk Oblast
- Founded: 1966
- Town status since: 1973

Government
  - City Head: Anna Shchekina
- Elevation: 300 m (980 ft)

Population (2010 Census)
  - Total: 86,610
  - Estimate (2025): 77,034 (−11.1%)
  - Rank: 194th in 2010

Administrative status
  - Subordinated to: Town of Ust-Ilimsk
  - Capital of: Ust-Ilimsky District, Town of Ust-Ilimsk

Municipal status
  - Urban okrug: Ust-Ilimsk Urban Okrug
  - Capital of: Ust-Ilimsk Urban Okrug, Ust-Ilimsky Municipal District
- Time zone: UTC+8 (MSK+5)
- Postal code: 666670–666687
- Dialing code: +7 39535
- OKTMO ID: 25738000001
- Website: www.ust-ilimsk.ru

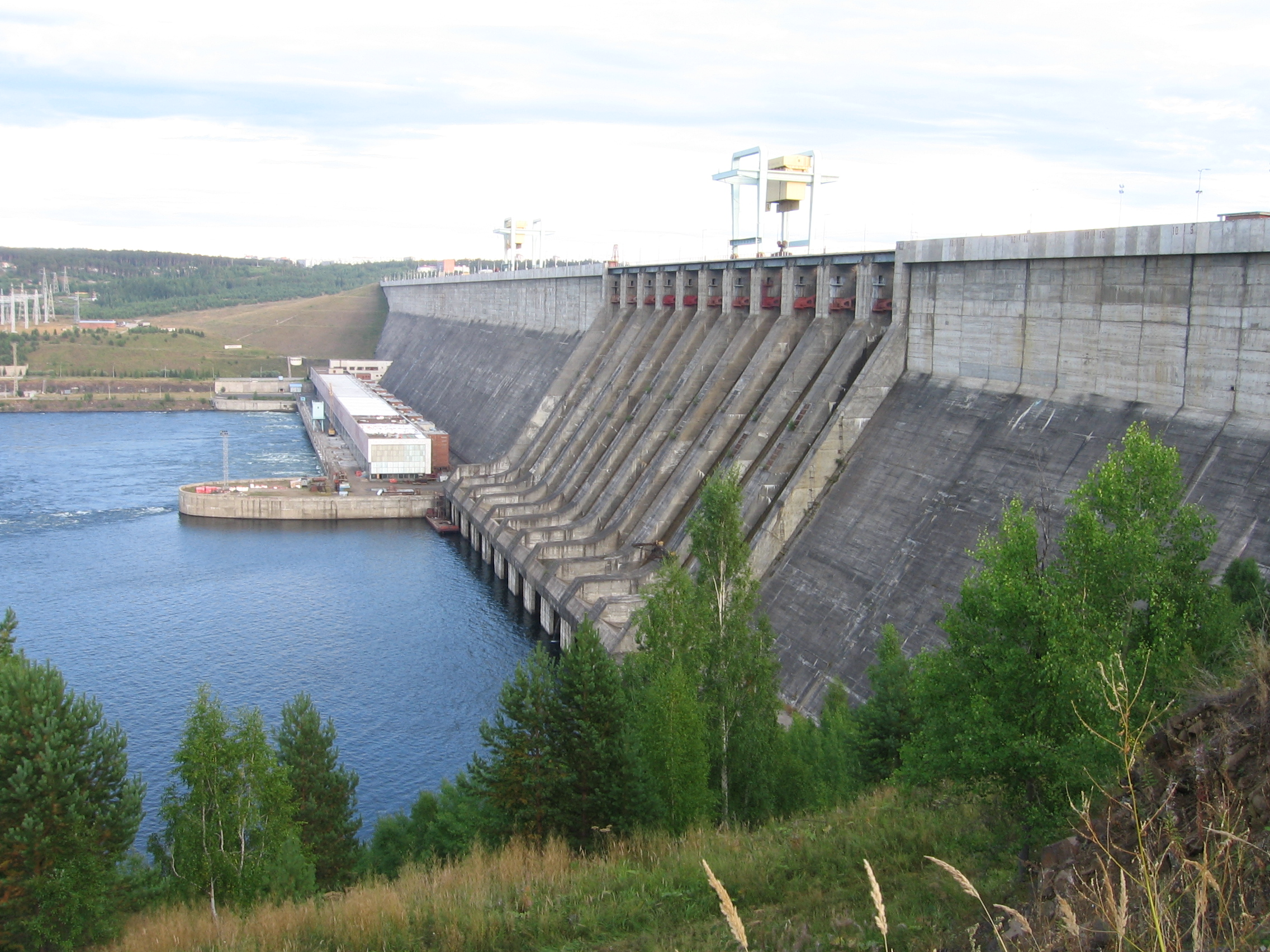
Ust-Ilimsk dam

Ust-Ilimsk (Russian: Усть-Илимск, IPA: [usʲtʲ ɪˈlʲimsk]) is a town in Irkutsk Oblast, Russia, located on the Angara River. Population: 86,610 (2010 census); 100,592 (2002 census); 109,280 (1989 Soviet census); 53,000 (1977).

== History ==
An ostrog (fortress) was built on the present site of the town in the 17th century; however, the modern town was not founded until 1966, during the construction of the Ust-Ilimsk Hydroelectric Power Station, which backs up both the Angara and the Ilim Rivers, and, incidentally, flooded the old town of Ilimsk, which was located further up the Ilim. The region was the site of one of the most notorious gulags of the 1930s ; tens of thousands died in the camp .

Town status was granted to it in 1973; the dam was completed in 1980.

== Administrative and municipal status ==
Within the framework of administrative divisions, Ust-Ilimsk serves as the administrative center of Ust-Ilimsky District, even though it is not a part of it. As an administrative division, it is incorporated separately as the Town of Ust-Ilimsk—an administrative unit with the status equal to that of the districts. As a municipal division, the Town of Ust-Ilimsk is incorporated as Ust-Ilimsk Urban Okrug.

== Geography ==
=== Climate ===
Ust-Ilimsk has a subarctic climate (Köppen Dfc) with warm, humid summers and severely cold, drier winters. The monthly 24-hour average temperature ranges from −23.1 °C (−9.6 °F) in January to 17.7 °C (63.9 °F). Precipitation is moderate and is somewhat higher in summer than at other times of the year. Sunshine is generous and the area receives 2,011 hours of bright sunshine annually.

Climate data for Ust-Ilimsk (1953−2001)
Month	Jan	Feb	Mar	Apr	May	Jun	Jul	Aug	Sep	Oct	Nov	Dec	Year
Record high °C (°F)	4.0 (39.2)	6.8 (44.2)	20.0 (68.0)	22.8 (73.0)	33.2 (91.8)	35.6 (96.1)	36.1 (97.0)	32.2 (90.0)	30.0 (86.0)	22.0 (71.6)	11.0 (51.8)	2.2 (36.0)	36.1 (97.0)
Mean daily maximum °C (°F)	−18.9 (−2.0)	−15.1 (4.8)	−4.8 (23.4)	4.1 (39.4)	13.0 (55.4)	21.0 (69.8)	24.2 (75.6)	20.5 (68.9)	12.5 (54.5)	1.9 (35.4)	−9.6 (14.7)	−17 (1)	2.6 (36.7)
Daily mean °C (°F)	−23.1 (−9.6)	−20.5 (−4.9)	−11.4 (11.5)	−1.5 (29.3)	7.3 (45.1)	14.5 (58.1)	17.7 (63.9)	14.4 (57.9)	6.8 (44.2)	−2.1 (28.2)	−13.3 (8.1)	−20.7 (−5.3)	−2.8 (27.0)
Mean daily minimum °C (°F)	−28.6 (−19.5)	−26.8 (−16.2)	−19.2 (−2.6)	−8.5 (16.7)	0.3 (32.5)	6.8 (44.2)	10.7 (51.3)	8.0 (46.4)	1.4 (34.5)	−6.7 (19.9)	−18.6 (−1.5)	−26.2 (−15.2)	−9.1 (15.6)
Record low °C (°F)	−53.9 (−65.0)	−50 (−58)	−45 (−49)	−36.1 (−33.0)	−12.2 (10.0)	−5.0 (23.0)	0.0 (32.0)	−4.0 (24.8)	−12.2 (10.0)	−36.3 (−33.3)	−47.8 (−54.0)	−52.2 (−62.0)	−53.9 (−65.0)
Average precipitation mm (inches)	30.8 (1.21)	16.5 (0.65)	26.5 (1.04)	38.8 (1.53)	41.7 (1.64)	50.4 (1.98)	75.8 (2.98)	62.8 (2.47)	35.7 (1.41)	30.5 (1.20)	33.3 (1.31)	32.4 (1.28)	475.2 (18.7)
Average precipitation days (≥ 0.1 mm)	15.5	19.6	21.2	17.3	15.8	8.4	7.4	7.9	16.3	23.6	23.9	18.6	195.5
Average relative humidity (%)	67.7	74.7	69.7	54.7	55.9	56.1	61.2	64.0	73.9	70.6	73.9	64.4	65.6
Mean monthly sunshine hours	68.2	112.0	167.4	192.0	229.4	291.0	282.1	291.4	126.0	111.6	72.0	68.2	2,011.3
Source: Climatebase.ru

== Economy and infrastructure ==
Alongside the hydroelectric plant, a thermal power plant, sawmills and industries such as food production are employers in the town.

A 214-kilometer (133 mi) branch railway connects Ust-Ilimsk to Khrebetovka on the Baikal-Amur Mainline. The town is also connected by road to Bratsk.

Ust-Ilimsk has a tram line, constructed by a local timber company to connect the city center with a nearby sawmill. Construction of the tramway began in 1982, with its opening in 1985. The line was later extended to a total length of 18 kilometers (11 mi). Traffic is coordinated to coincide with shift change times at the mill, as well as hourly runs outside these times. There are plans to extend the line to a new mill to the north of the town, as well as to the city railway station.

The Ust-Ilimsk Airport was closed in 2001.

== Sports ==
Lesokhimik is a professional bandy club which played in the highest division of the Russian Bandy League between 2004 and 2008.

== Gallery ==
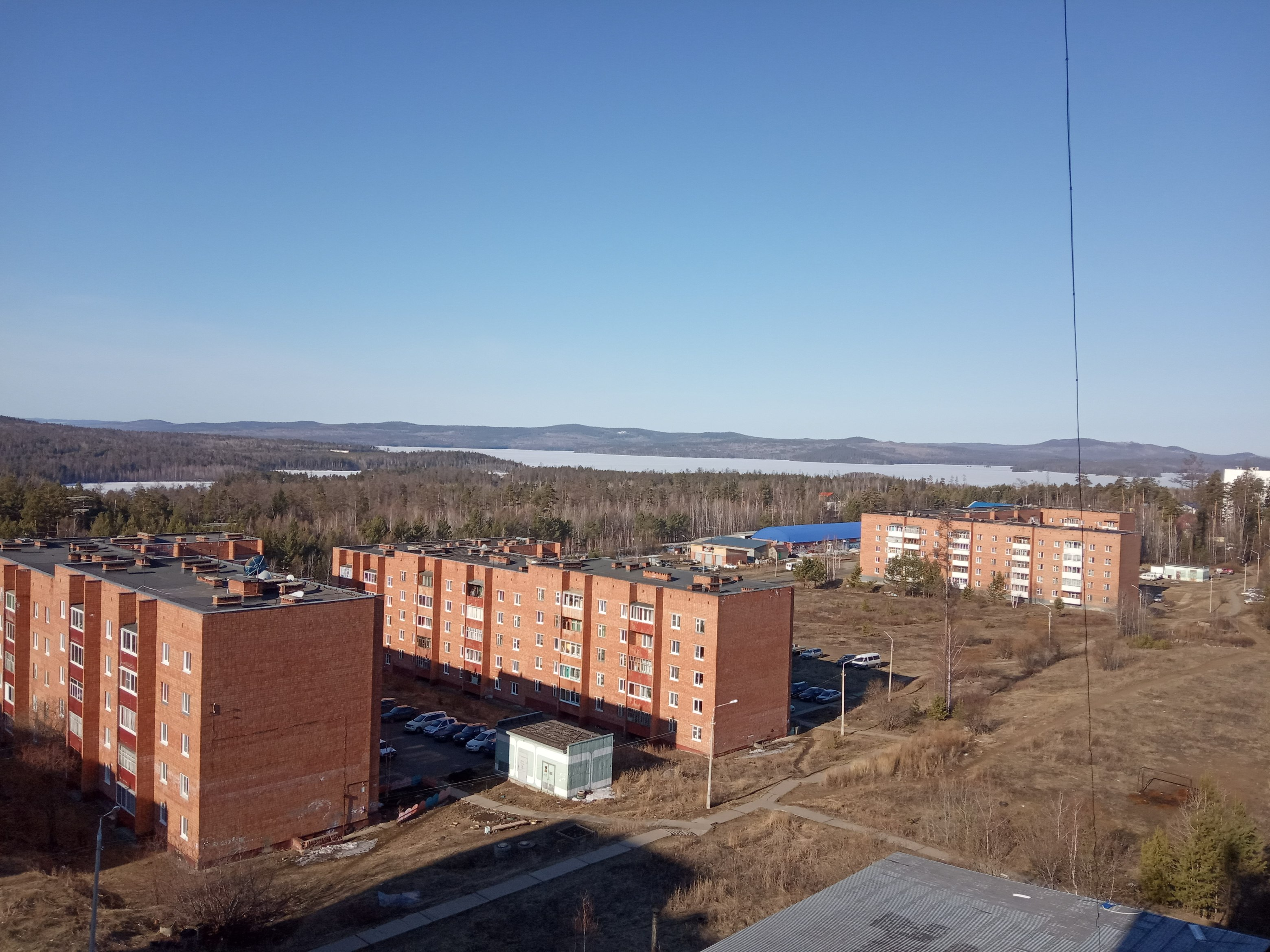
Aerial view of microdistrict № 9

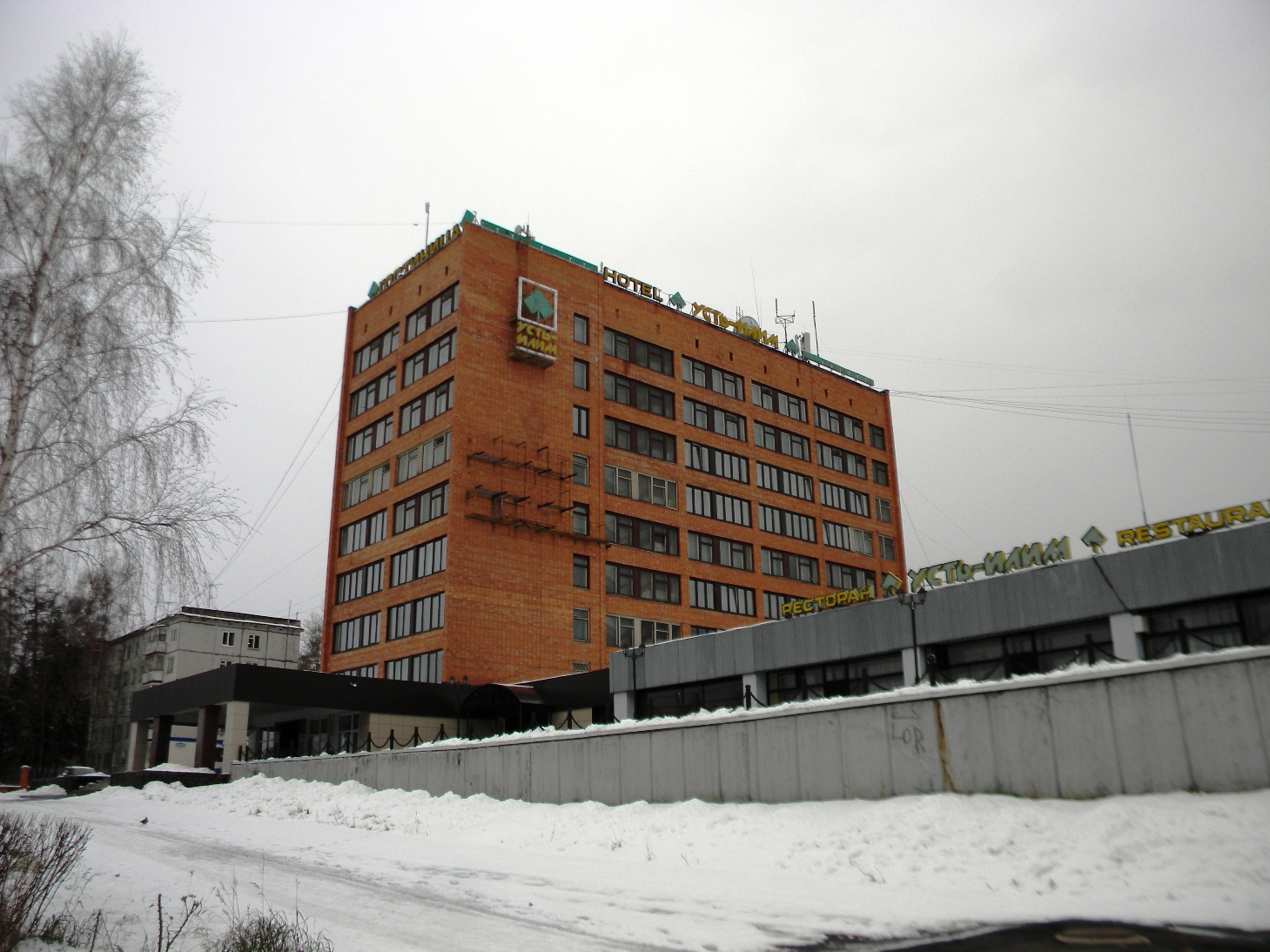
Hotel

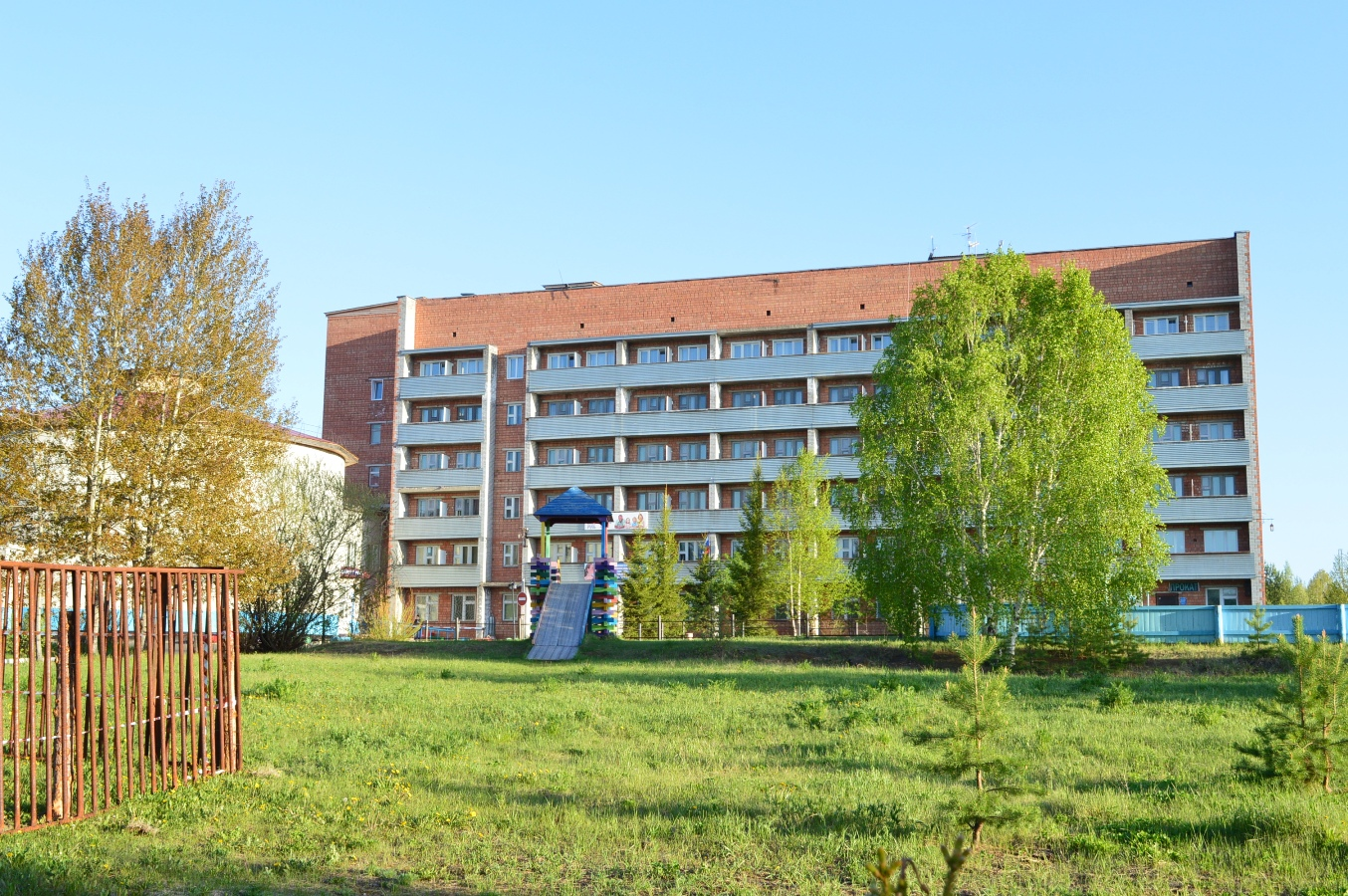
Resort "Rus" building

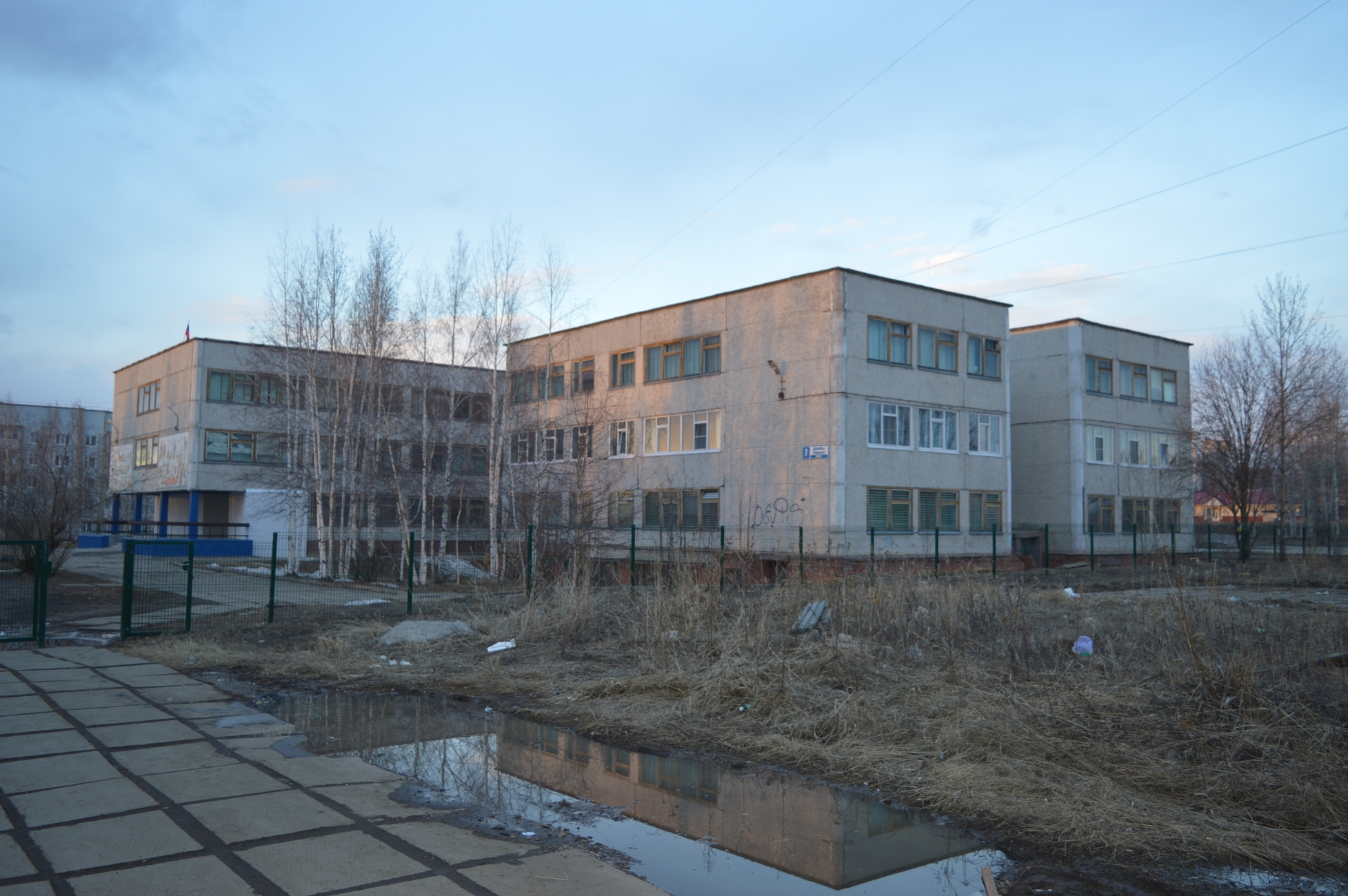
School №15

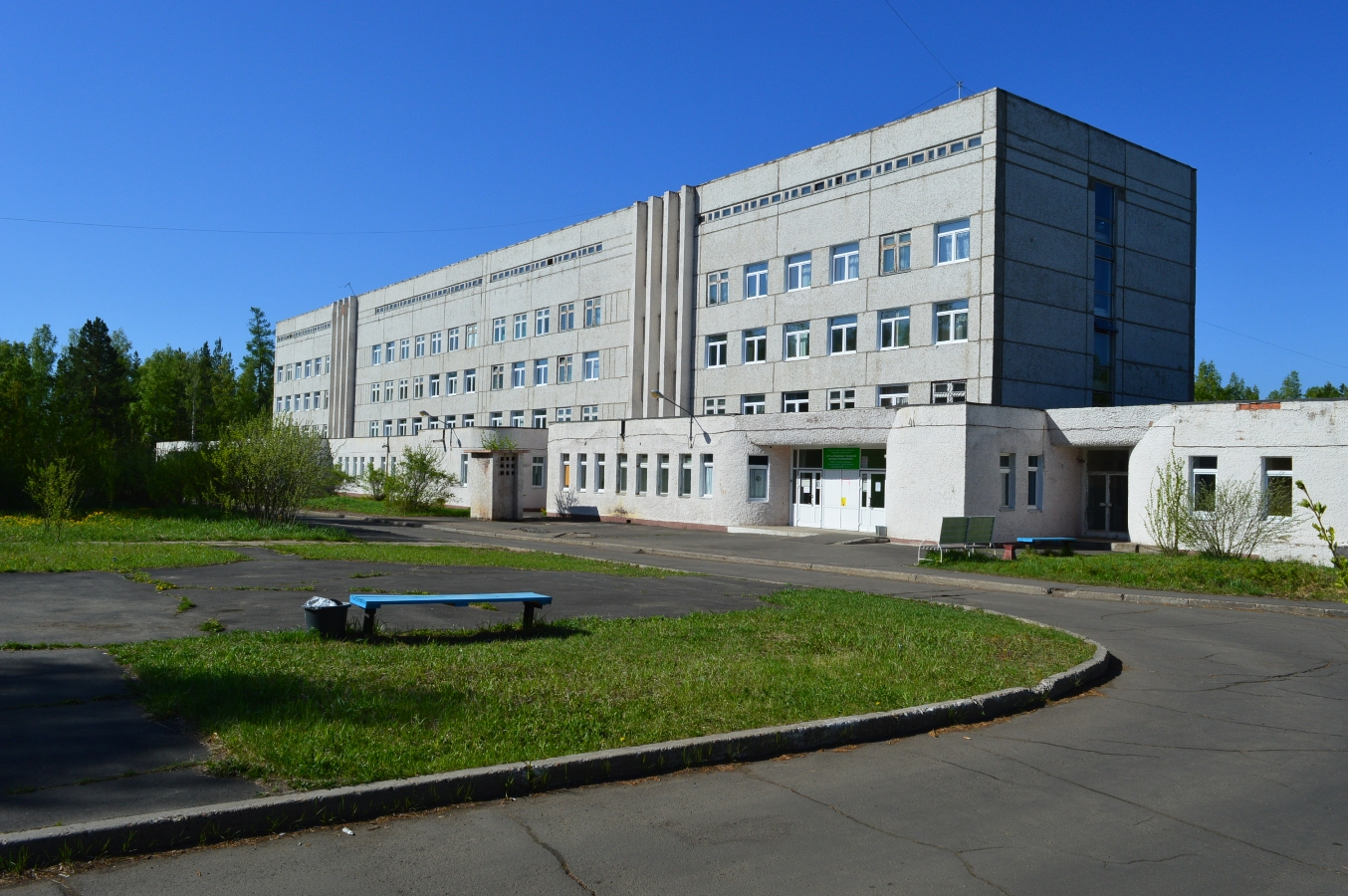
Children's polyclinic

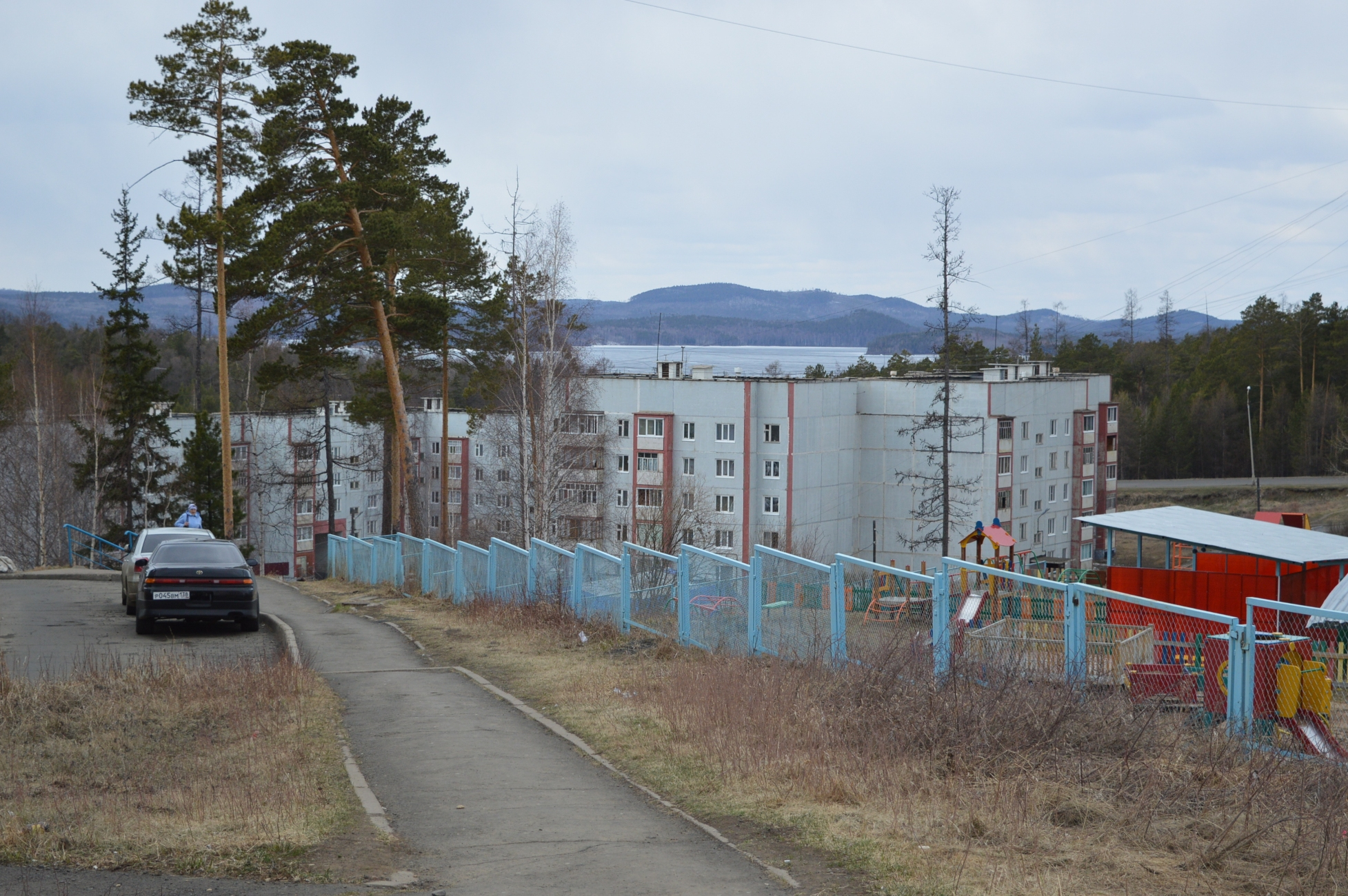
View on the nearby Ust-Ilimsk Reservoir
