= Stroitel (inhabited locality) =

Stroitel (Russian: Строи́тель) is the name of several inhabited localities in Russia.

Urban localities

- Stroitel, Belgorod Oblast, a town in Yakovlevsky District of Belgorod Oblast

Rural localities

- Stroitel, Kaluga Oblast, a village in Tarussky District of Kaluga Oblast
- Stroitel, Moscow Oblast, a settlement under the administrative jurisdiction of the Town of Mozhaysk in Mozhaysky District of Moscow Oblast
- Stroitel, Novgorod Oblast, a village in Bykovskoye Settlement of Pestovsky District in Novgorod Oblast
- Stroitel, Pskov Oblast, a village in Strugo-Krasnensky District of Pskov Oblast
- Stroitel, Tambov Oblast, a settlement in Tsninsky Selsoviet of Tambovsky District in Tambov Oblast
