= Bratsk Hydroelectric Power Station =

Bratsk Dam
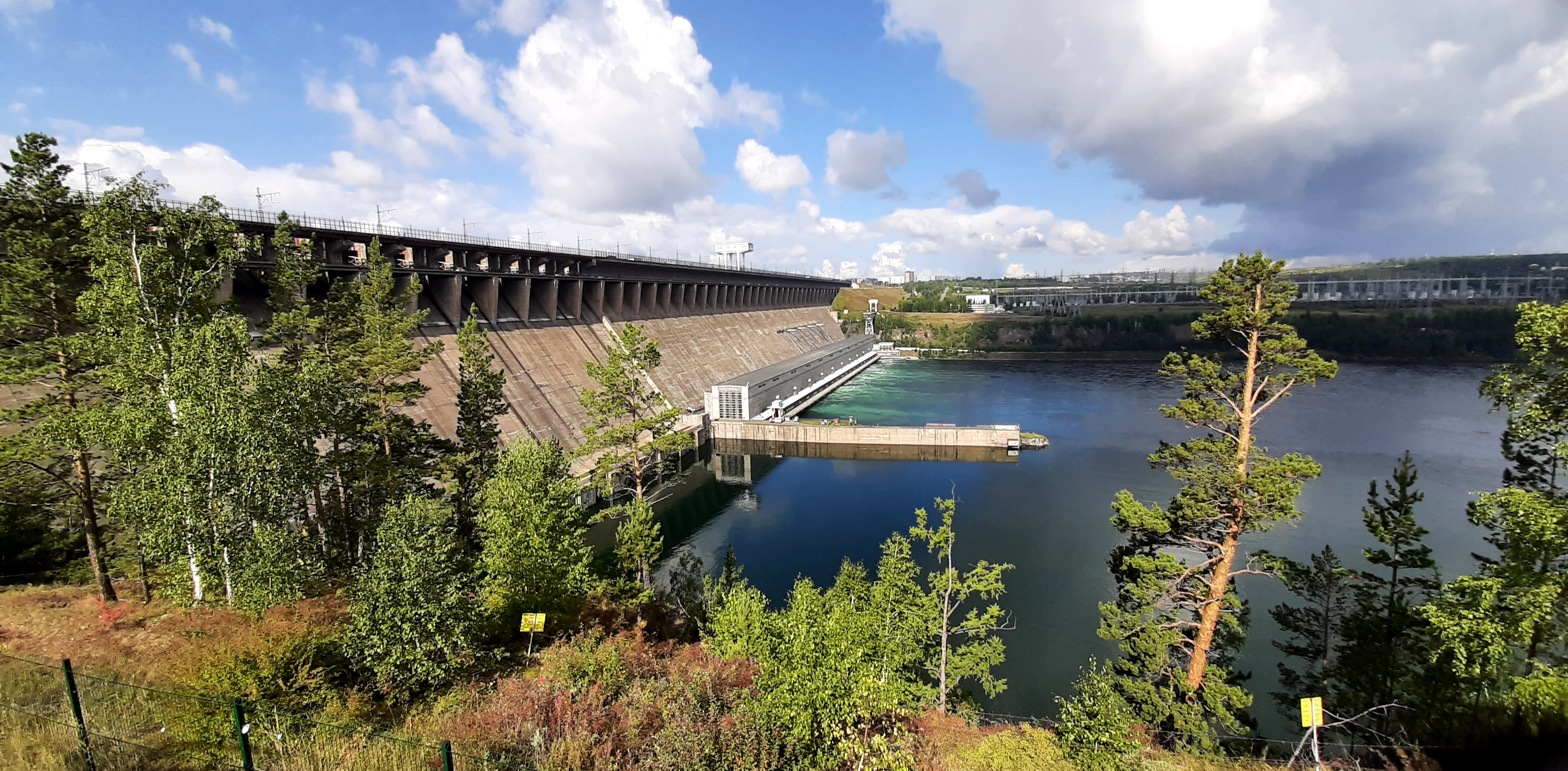

- Location within Russia
- Interactive map of Bratsk Dam
- Official name: Bratsk Hydroelectric Power Station
- Location: Bratsk, Russia
- Coordinates: 56°17′10″N 101°47′10″E
- Construction began: 1954
- Opening date: 1967
- Owner: Irkutskenergo

Dam and spillways
- Impounds: Angara River
- Height: 124.5 m (408 ft)
- Length: 924 m (3,031 ft)

Reservoir
- Creates: Bratsk Reservoir
- Total capacity: 169.27 km^{3} (41 mi^{3})
- Surface area: 5,470 km^{2} (2,112 mi^{2})

Power Station
- Hydraulic head: 108 m (354 ft)
- Turbines: 15 × 250 MW; 3 × 255 MW
- Installed capacity: 4,515 MW
- Annual generation: 22.6 TWh

The Bratsk Hydroelectric Power Station (also referred to as The 50 years of Great October Dam) is a concrete gravity dam on the Angara River and adjacent hydroelectric power station. It is the second level of the Angara River hydroelectric station cascade in Irkutsk Oblast, Russia. From its commissioning in 1966, the station was the world's single biggest power producer until Krasnoyarsk Hydroelectric Power Station reached 5,000 MW (at 10 turbines) in 1971. Annually the station produces 22.6 TWh. Currently, the Bratsk Power Station operates 18 hydro-turbines, each with capacity of 250 MW, produced by the Leningrad Metal Works ("LMZ", Russian: ЛМЗ, Russian: Ленинградский Металлический завод) in the 1960s.

== Design and specifications ==
=== Dam ===
Components:

- concrete wall 924 m long and 124.5 m high at its maximum (stationary part 515 m long, waterdrop part 242 m long, dumb part 167 m).
- by-wall house 516 m long
- riverbank concrete walls all 506 m long
- right bank ground wall 2,987 m long, left - 723 m long.

On the top of the dam are the track of the Taishet-Lena railway line and a vehicle road.

There are no navigational channels, because the Angara has no through ship routes. Nevertheless, the construction project includes the possibility to build a ship elevator.

Bratsk dam is often referred to as the second largest in the world by reservoir storage capacity.

=== Power plant ===
The Turbine Hall contains 18 Francis hydroturbine units, ca. 250 MW each, with 106 m of operating head. A 5,140 m-long penstock forms the Bratsk Reservoir. With a 4,500 MW capacity, and 22.6 TWh of annual output, it is Russia's second largest single producer of hydroelectricity. Output is distributed into five 500 kV power lines and twenty 220 kV lines.

The plant was designed by the Moscow-based Hydroproject (Russian: «Гидропроект») institute, and is operated by the joint-stock company Irkutskenergo (Russian: «Иркутскэнерго»), although all the buildings themselves belong to Russia's federal government. A reconstruction project includes increasing the output towards 5,000 MW. At present, Irkutskenergo together with JSC Silovii Mashini (Russian: «Силовые машины») is modernizing the aging turbines.

== Economics ==
- The plant powers hundreds of factories.
- It became a part of the Bratsk territorial-production complex (Russian: Братский территориально-производственный комплекс)
- About 75% of the output is consumed by the Bratsk Aluminium Plant.

== History ==
The plan to build the hydroelectric plant was approved in September 1954 and later that year the first workers and machines arrived at Bratsk. On December 21, 1954, preparation works were initiated by the Nizhneangargasstroy department (Russian: Нижнеангаргэсстрой), later renamed to Bratskgasstroy (Russian: Братскгэсстрой). Concurrently, the city of Bratsk was founded. On December 12, 1955, Bratsk was officially converted from a workers settlement into a city by the decree of the Presidium of the Supreme Soviet of the RSFSR.

Construction was declared as the Komsomol's high-tempo priority goal and was in the center of public attention. Eventually, a lot of the workers were awarded state prizes and the plant became a symbol of the industrial development of Siberia.

From July 1955 to October 1957 the 220 kV power line to Irkutsk was constructed. On November 6, 1957, the Bratsk substation received the first current from the newly constructed plant and later that year this current was transmitted to Irkutsk for the first time via the newly created power line. In 1961 the second 500 kV power line was added.

On July 18, 1961, the Bratsk Reservoir started filling (level raised up to 100 m so that it became the largest artificial lake of that time). First stationary 225 MW generator (No. 18) became operational on November 28, 1961, at 10:15 local time. After 7 days on December 5 the second unit No. 17 started to operate and on December 12, 1963, units No. 16 and No. 15 were included into the Unified Energy System of Siberia. On May 9, 1964, operators began to control the plant as the central control post was put into service. On September 30, 1964, the last cubic meter of concrete was poured into the dam wall.

Construction of a railway track over the dam began on March 3, 1965, and it started to operate on June 16. A vehicular road opened on July 28.

On December 14, 1966, the last unit, No. 1 was operational and on September 8, 1967, the State Commission accepted the inclusion of Bratsk into constant use.

== See also ==
- Irkutsk Energy, an operator of Bratsk plant
- List of conventional hydroelectric power stations
- List of power stations in Russia

== Literature ==
- Hugo Portisch: So sah ich Sibirien. Kremayr & Scheriau, Wien 1967. (German) 342+8 pages with 27 maps, + ca. 100 pages with 158 pictures (45 coloured). Picture page 13 after page 32, 4 pictures after page 64. Chapter "Das größte E-Werk der Welt" (= The biggest Power Plant of the World), pages 68–79.
