= Angara =

River in Irkutsk Oblast and Krasnoyarsk Krai, Russia

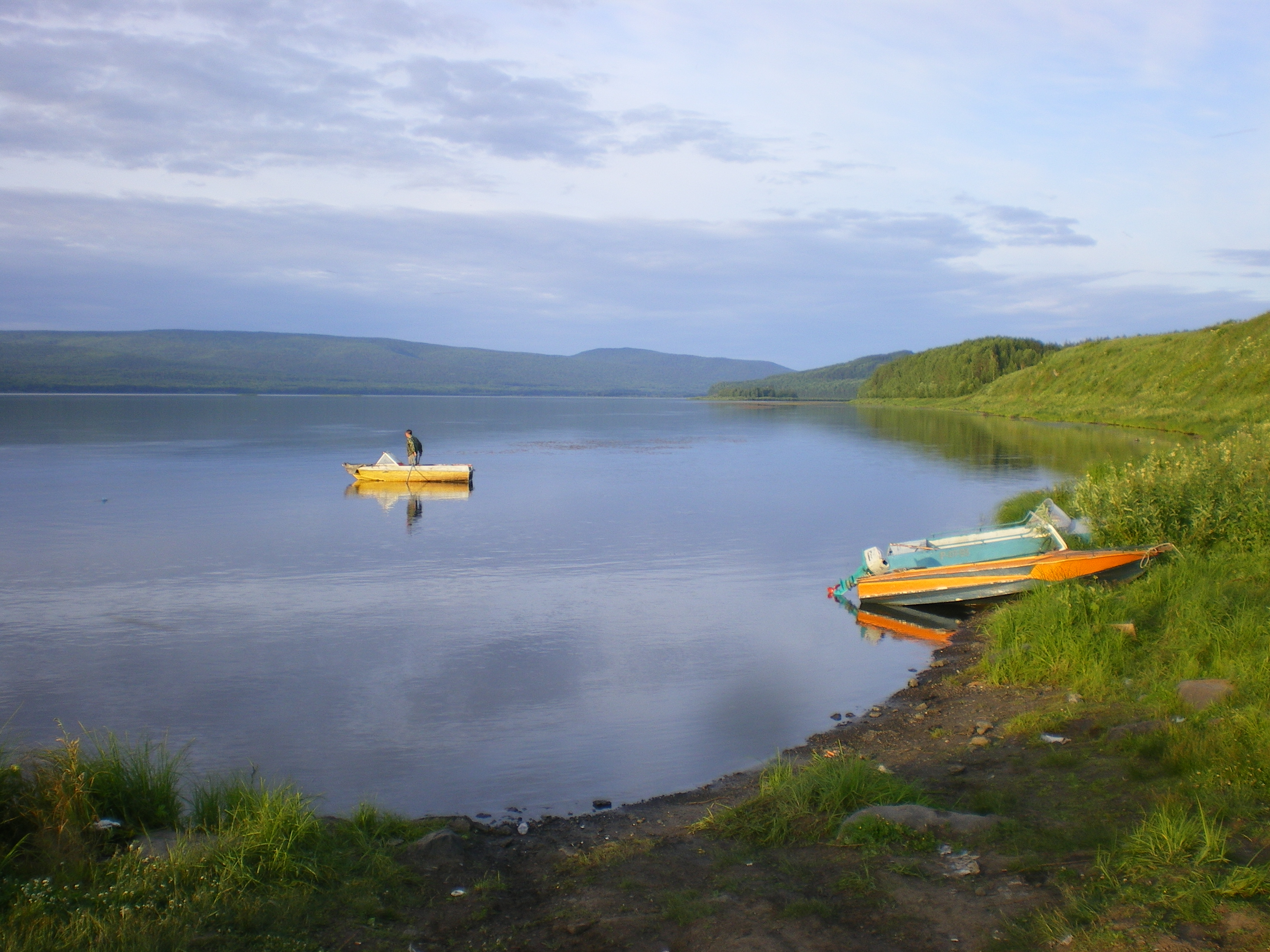

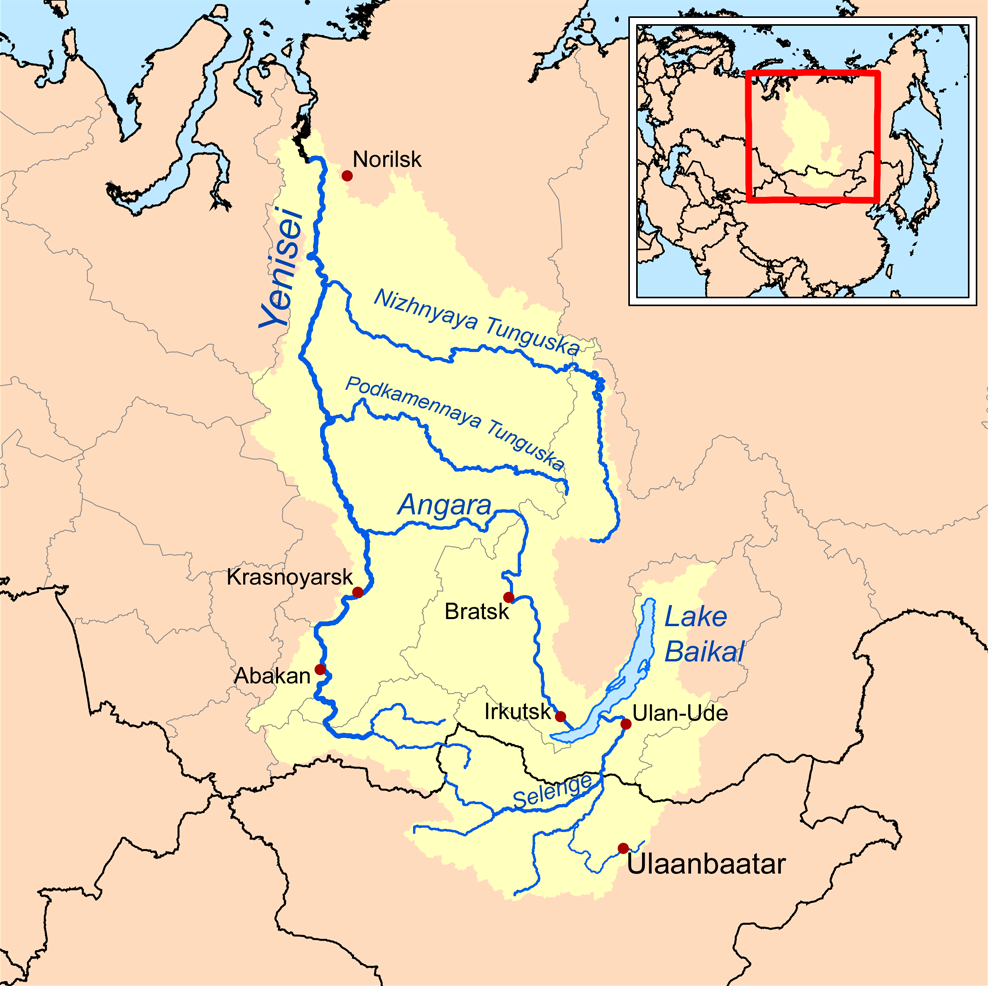

Location
- Country: Russia
- Regions: Irkutsk Oblast, Krasnoyarsk Krai
- Cities: Ust-Ilimsk, Bratsk, Angarsk, Irkutsk

Physical characteristics
- Source: Lake Baikal
  - location: Baykal, Irkutsk Oblast
  - coordinates: 51.867°N 104.818°E
  - elevation: 389 m (1,276 ft)
- Mouth: Yenisey
  - location: Lesosibirsk, Krasnoyarsk Krai
  - coordinates: 58.102°N 92.991°E
  - elevation: 75 m (246 ft)
- Length: 1,849 km (1,149 mi) to 1,779 km (1,105 mi)
- Basin size: 1,039,000 km^{2} (401,000 mi^{2}) to 1,056,000 km^{2} (408,000 mi^{2})
- Discharge
  - location: Confluence of the Yenisey (near mouth)
  - average: 4,530 m^{3}/s (160,000 cu ft/s) to 4,980 m^{3}/s (176,000 cu ft/s)

Basin features
- Progression: Yenisey→ Kara Sea

The Angara (/ˌæŋɡəˈrɑː, ˌɑːŋ-/; Russian: Ангара [ənɡɐˈra]) or Angar (Russian Buryat: Ангар [ˈaɴɢɐr] мүрэн) is a major river in Siberia, which traces a course through Russia's Irkutsk Oblast and Krasnoyarsk Krai. It drains out of Lake Baikal and is the headwater tributary of the Yenisey. It is 1,849 kilometres (1,149 mi) long, and has a drainage basin of 1,039,000 square kilometres (401,000 sq mi). It was formerly known as the Lower or Nizhnyaya Angara (distinguishing it from the Upper Angara). Below its junction with the Ilim, it was formerly known as the Upper Tunguska (Russian: Верхняя Тунгуска, Verhnyaya Tunguska, distinguishing it from the Lower Tunguska) and, with the names reversed, as the Lower Tunguska.

== Course ==
Leaving Lake Baikal near the settlement of Listvyanka, the Angara flows north past the Irkutsk Oblast cities of Irkutsk, Angarsk, Bratsk, and Ust-Ilimsk. It then crosses the Angara Range and turns west, entering Krasnoyarsk Krai, and joining the Yenisey near Strelka, 40 kilometres (25 mi) south-east of Lesosibirsk.

=== Dams and reservoirs ===
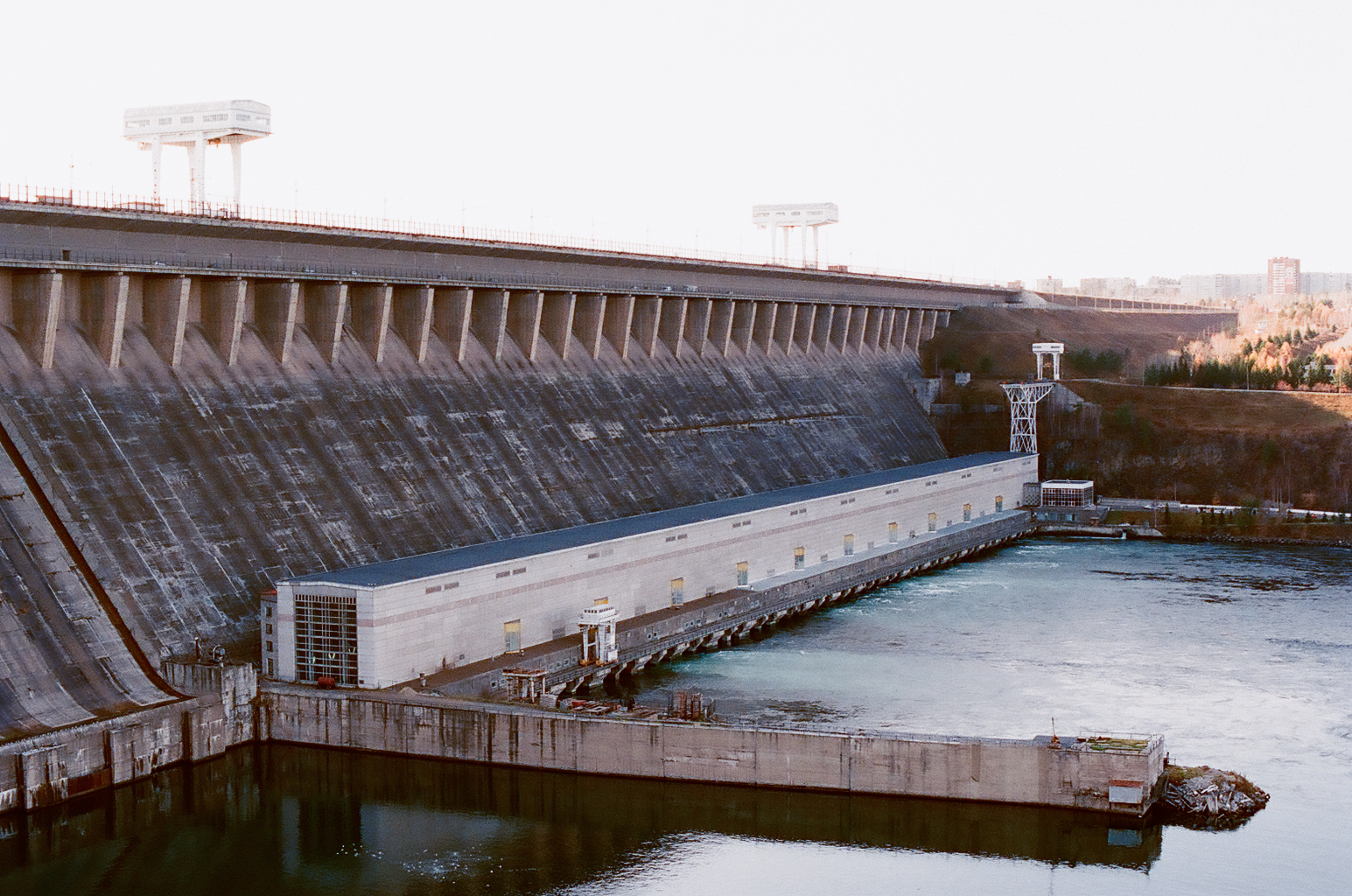
The Bratsk Dam

Four dams of major hydroelectric plants - constructed since the 1950s - exploit the waters of the Angara:

- Irkutsk Dam, forming the Irkutsk Reservoir, which floods the valley of the river from its source to Irkutsk, and slightly raises the water level in Lake Baikal
- Bratsk Dam, forming the Bratsk Reservoir
- Ust-Ilimsk Dam, at Ust-Ilimsk, forming the Ust-Ilimsk Reservoir
- Boguchany Dam, at Kodinsk

The reservoirs for these dams flooded a number of villages along the Angara and its tributaries (including the historic fort of Ilimsk on the Ilim), as well as agricultural areas in the river valley. Due to effects on the way of life of the rural residents of the Angara valley, dam construction was criticized by a number of Soviet intellectuals, in particular by the Irkutsk writer Valentin Rasputin - both in his novel Farewell to Matyora (1976) and in his non-fiction book Siberia, Siberia (1991).

== Navigation ==
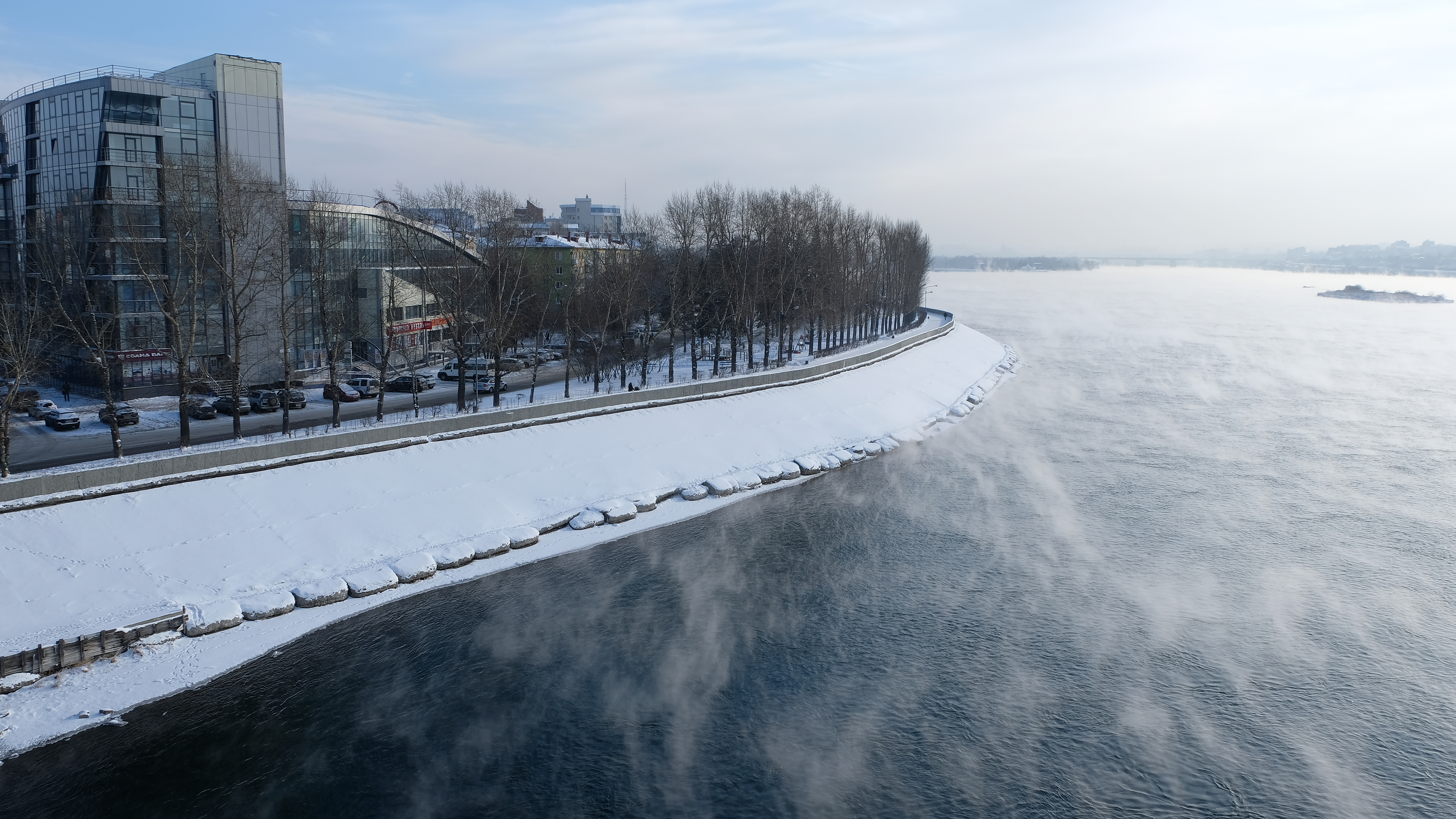
Embankment of the Angara in Irkutsk

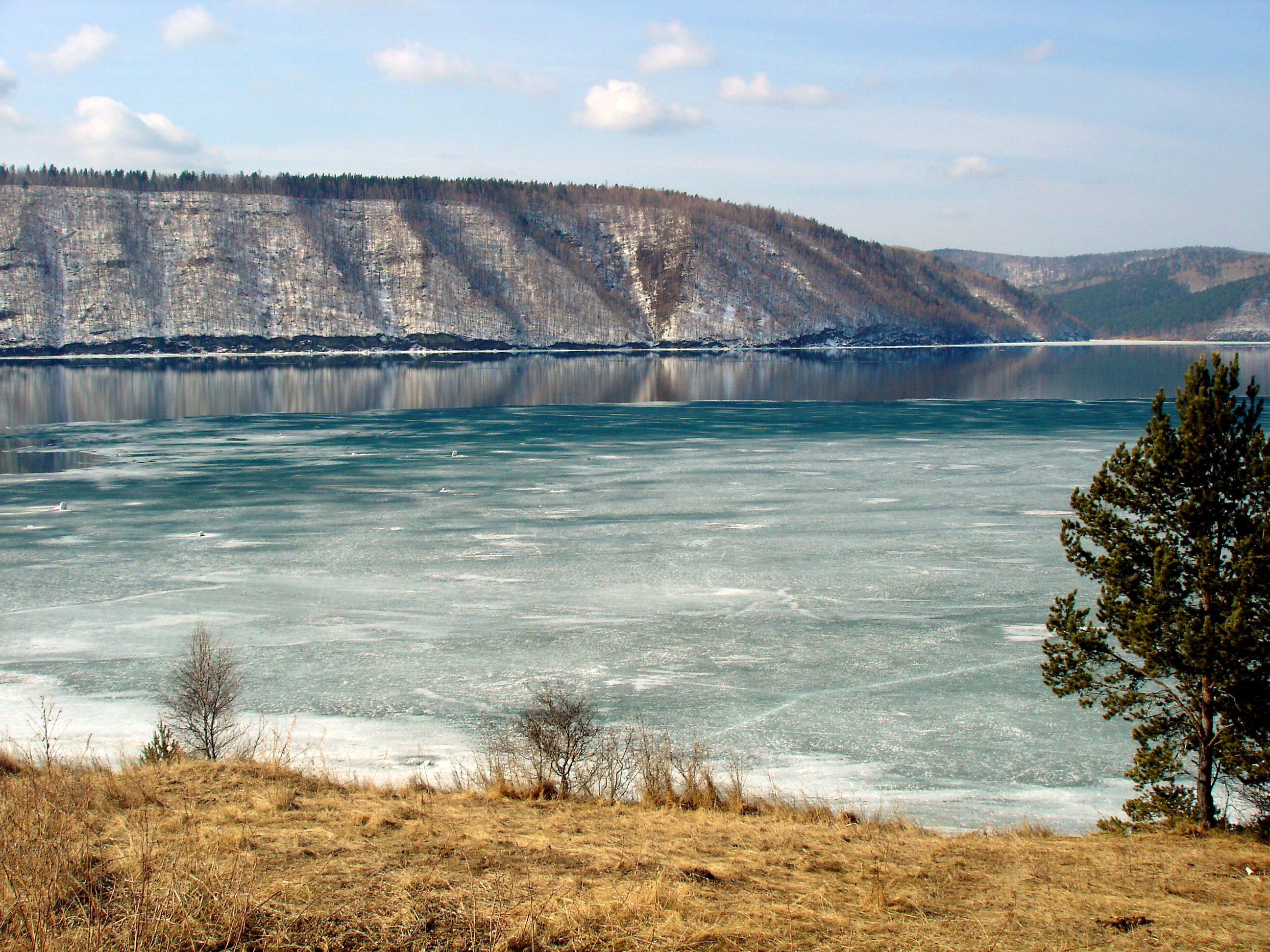
The Angara at Talzy, near Lake Baikal

The Angara is navigable by modern watercraft on several isolated sections:

- from Lake Baikal to Irkutsk
- from Irkutsk to Bratsk
- on the Ust-Ilimsk Reservoir
- from the Boguchany Dam (Kodinsk) to the river's fall into the Yenisey.

The section between the Ust-Ilimsk Dam and the Boguchany Dam had not been navigable due to rapids. However, with the completion of the Boguchany Dam and its reservoir, at least part of this section of the river will be navigable. Nonetheless, this will not enable through navigation from Lake Baikal to the Yenisey, as none of the existing three dams has been provided with a ship lock or a boat lift, nor will the Boguchany Dam have one.

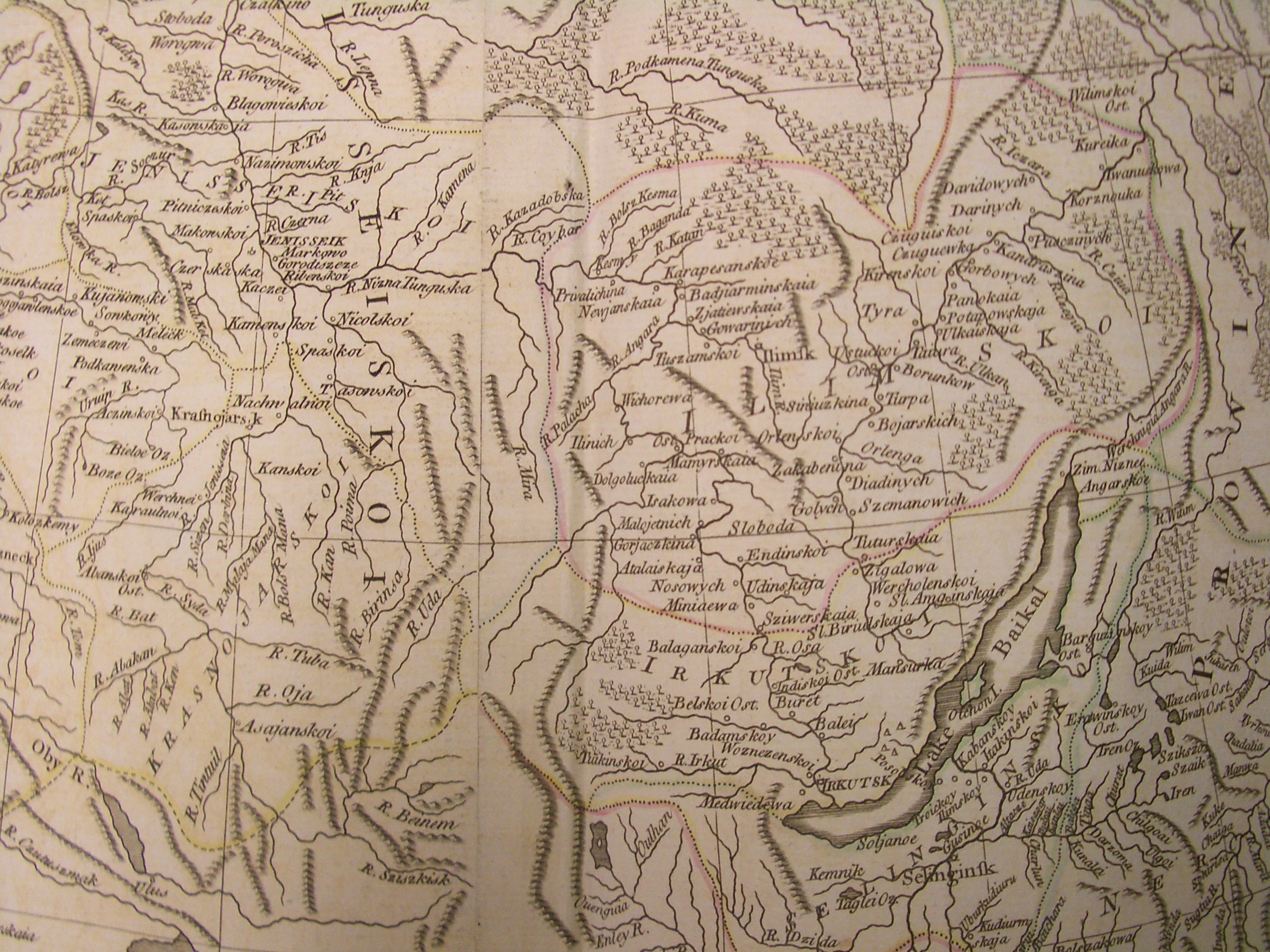
The historical significance of the Angara and the Ilim as water routes is attested by a chain of villages along them (many of which, as well as the town of Ilimsk, were flooded by modern dams) on this map from 1773. Note that the lower course of the Angara is labeled as Nizhnyaya Tunguska – the name which is currently applied to another river

Despite the absence of a continuous navigable waterway, the Angara and its tributary the Ilim were of considerable importance for Russian colonization of Siberia since ca. 1630, when they (and the necessary portages) formed important water routes connecting the Yenisey with Lake Baikal and the Lena. The river lost its transportation significance after the construction of an overland route between Krasnoyarsk and Irkutsk and, later, the Trans-Siberian Railway.

== Tributaries ==
The largest tributaries of the Angara are, from source to mouth:

- Irkut (left)
- Kitoy (left)
- Belaya (left)
- Oka (left)
- Iya (left)
- Ilim (right)
- Kova (left)
- Koda (right)
- Chadobets (right)
- Mura (left)
- Irkeneyeva (right)
- Taseyeva (left)

== See also ==
- List of rivers of Russia
- Lena-Angara Plateau
- Yenisey Range
