= Ust-Ilimsk Hydroelectric Power Station =

Ust-Ilimsk Dam
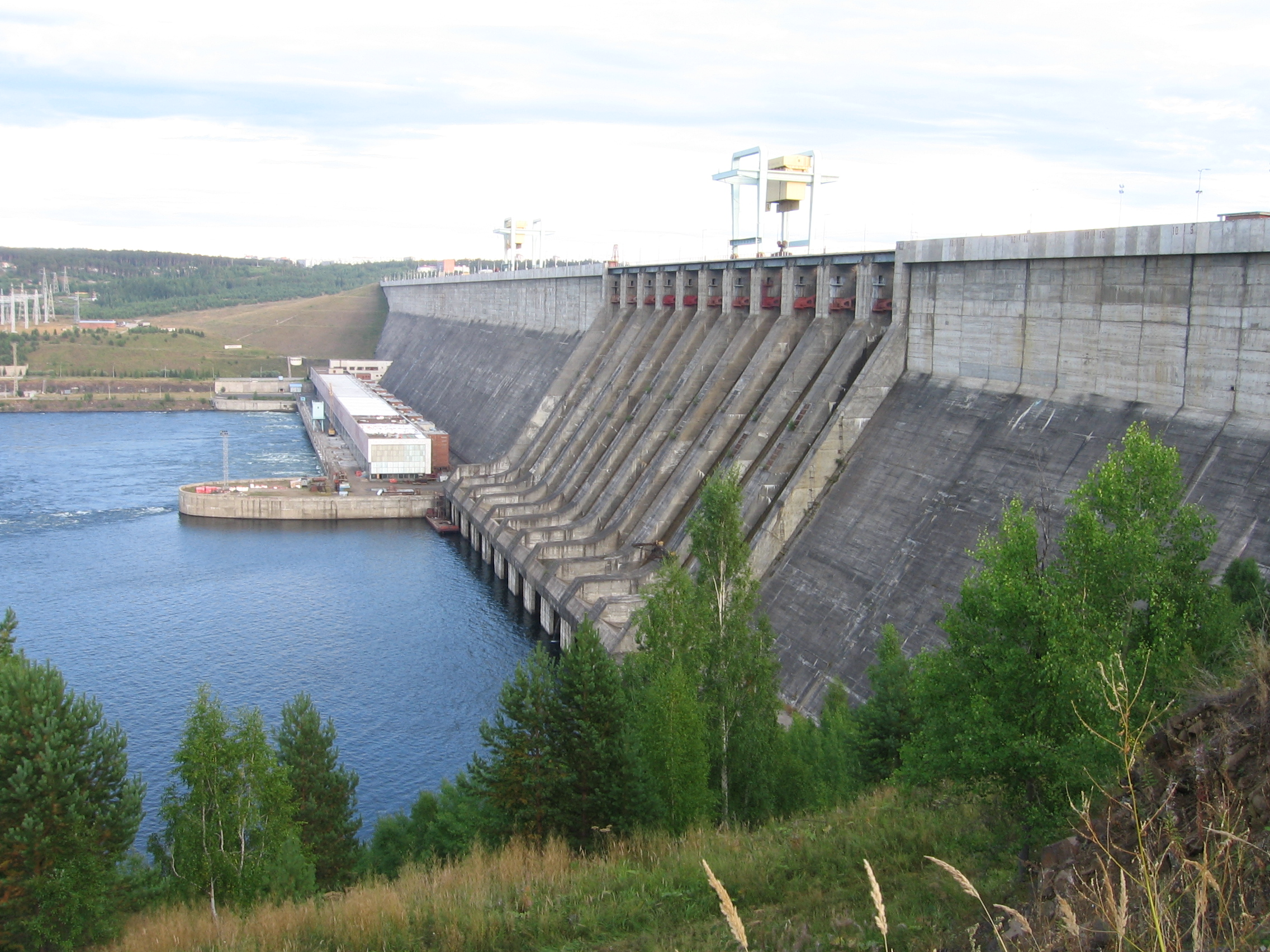

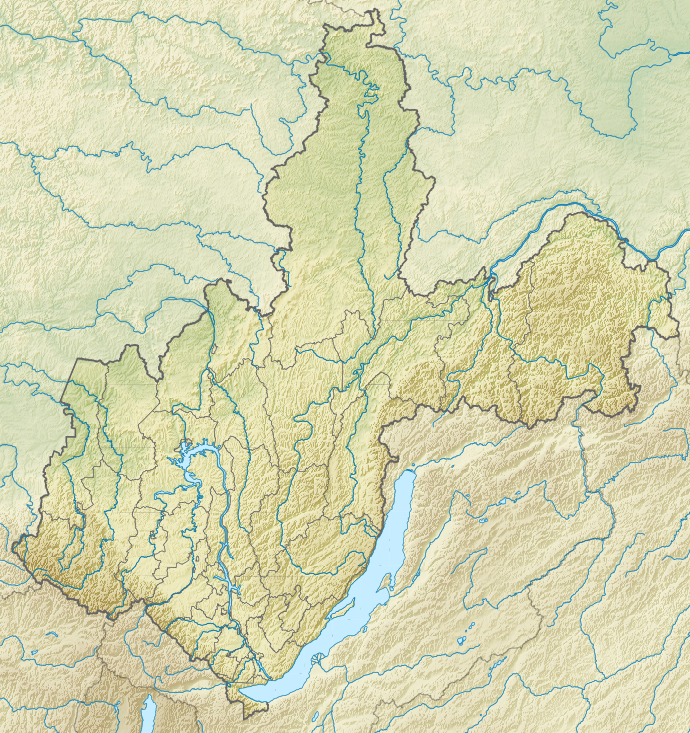
- Location within Irkutsk Oblast Location within Russia
- Official name: Ust-Ilimsk Hydroelectric Power Station
- Location: Ust-Ilimsk, Irkutsk Oblast, Russia
- Coordinates: 57°58′04″N 102°41′37″E
- Construction began: 1963; 63 years ago
- Opening date: 1974; 52 years ago
- Owner: Irkutskenergo

Dam and spillways
- Type of dam: Concrete, gravity
- Impounds: Angara River
- Height: 105 m (344 ft)
- Length: 1,475 m (4,839 ft)

Reservoir
- Creates: Ust-Ilimsk Reservoir

Power Station
- Commission date: 1980
- Turbines: 16 x 240 MW Francis type
- Installed capacity: 3,840 MW
- Annual generation: 21.7 TWh

The Ust-Ilimsk Hydroelectric Power Station (Ust-Ilimsk HPS) is a concrete gravity dam on the Angara River with an adjacent hydroelectric power station. It is located near Ust-Ilimsk, Irkutsk Oblast in Russia and is the third dam on the Angara cascades. Construction of the dam began in 1963, its reservoir began to fill in 1974, and the power plant was commissioned in 1980.

== History ==
=== Background ===
Between 1951 and 1955, construction of the Ust-Ilimsk HPS was designated as a priority and in September 1960, the State Commission determined the most suitable spot for the dam. It would be constructed on the Angara River, 20 km (12 mi) below the mouth of the Ilim River. Gidroproekt All-Union Design and Exploratory Institute produced the design of the HPS and on June 8, 1962, the Central Committee of the CPSU and Ministerial Council of the USSR determined the schedule of construction and the project's scope.

=== Construction ===
Construction on Stage I of the HPS began in 1963. This included preparing the dam's foundation, various construction facilities and 220 kV power lines. In addition, the village of Ust-Ilimsk was created to support workers on the project. By 1966, the Bratsk-Ust-Ilimsk motorway was opened to traffic and in March of that year, construction began on the actual power plant. On 22 April 1968, the first concrete was poured into the dam's foundation and by 3 October 3 1974, the dam began to inundate the Angara River, creating its reservoir. The dam was accepted for industrial operation in 1980.

=== Generation ===
By 1981, the HPS had generated its first 100 GWh which had doubled by 1986 and doubled again by 1995 with 400 GWh. By October 1, 2005, it had produced 600 GWh of electricity. For comparison, in 2008, U.S. residential and commercial sectors consumed about 517 GWh for lighting. On average, the station produces 21.7 GWh annually and utilizes its installed capacity for 5,050 hours out of 8,760 a year.

== Specifications ==
The main dam is 1,475 m (4,839 ft) long and 105 m (344 ft) high with a spillway of 242 m (794 ft) in length. It is flanked by two earth-fill auxiliary dams, one on its left (west) bank that is 1,710 m (5,610 ft) long and 28 m (92 ft) high. On the right (east) bank, the auxiliary dam is 538 m (1,765 ft) long and 47 m (154 ft) high. The power station is located on the right (east) bank and is 440 m (1,440 ft) long and houses 16 turbines with an installed capacity of 3,840 MW. The power station is designed to support another two turbines which, if installed, would bring its capacity to 4,320 MW.

== See also ==
- List of power stations in Russia
