= Gremuchiy (Krasnoyarsk Krai) =

Coordinates: 58.4090°N 97.5411°E

Gremuchiy is an urban-type settlement as part of the Krasnogorievsk rural locality in the Boguchansky District of Russia. It is located in the north-eastern part of the Krasnoyarsk Krai. It got its name from the Gremuchiy brook (it can be translated as Rattle brook).

== Geography ==
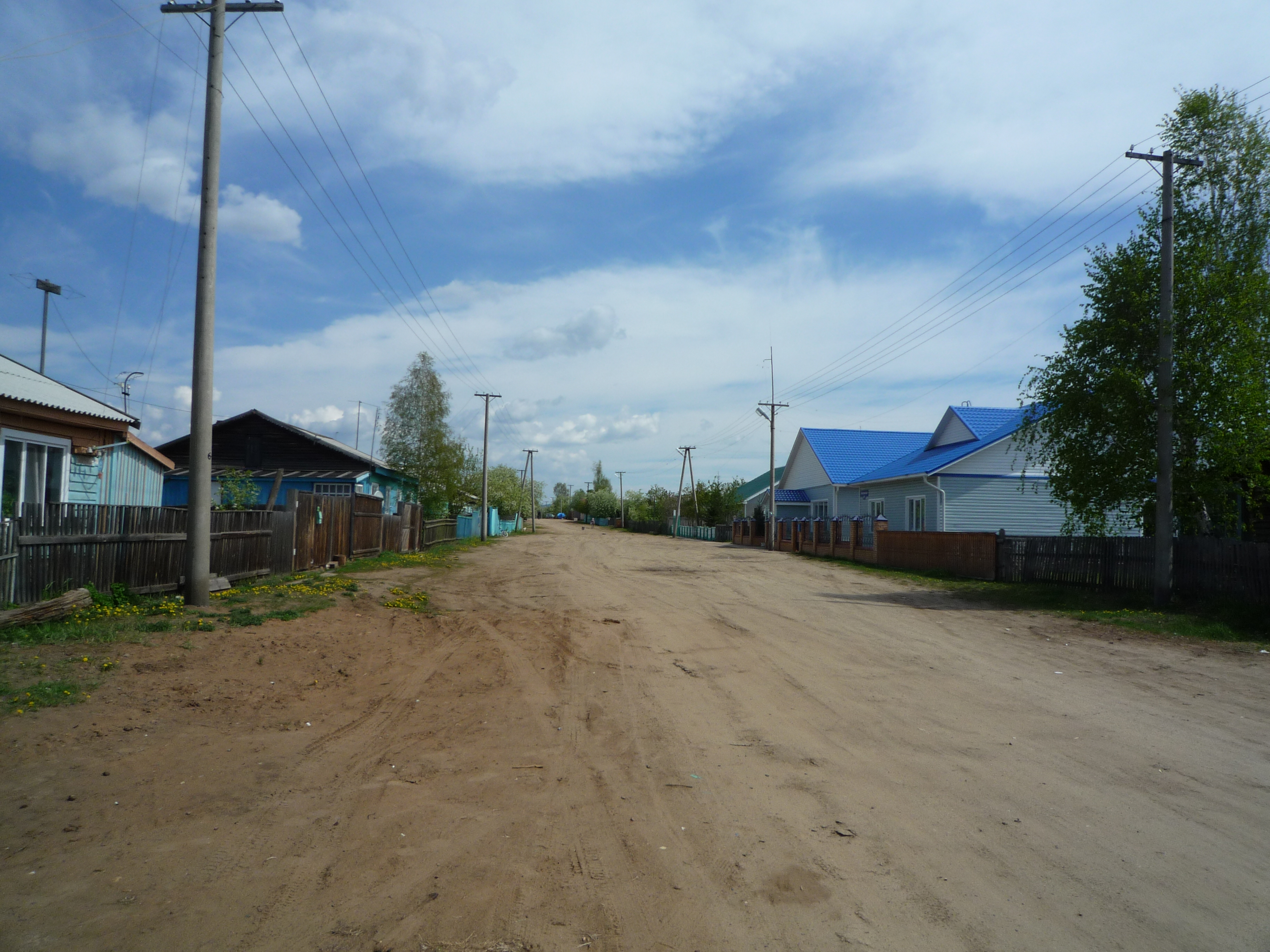
Moscow street

The settlement is situated on the right shore of the Angara River opposite to Boguchany (the administrative center of the Boguchansky District of the Krasnoyarsk Krai, Russia).

Neighboring areas:

- east: the Krasnogorievsk rural locality (the administrative center)
- south: Boguchany

== Demographics ==
2010 year - 1881

== Economy ==
The main occupation of the locals - wood export and timber rafting.

== Infrastructure ==
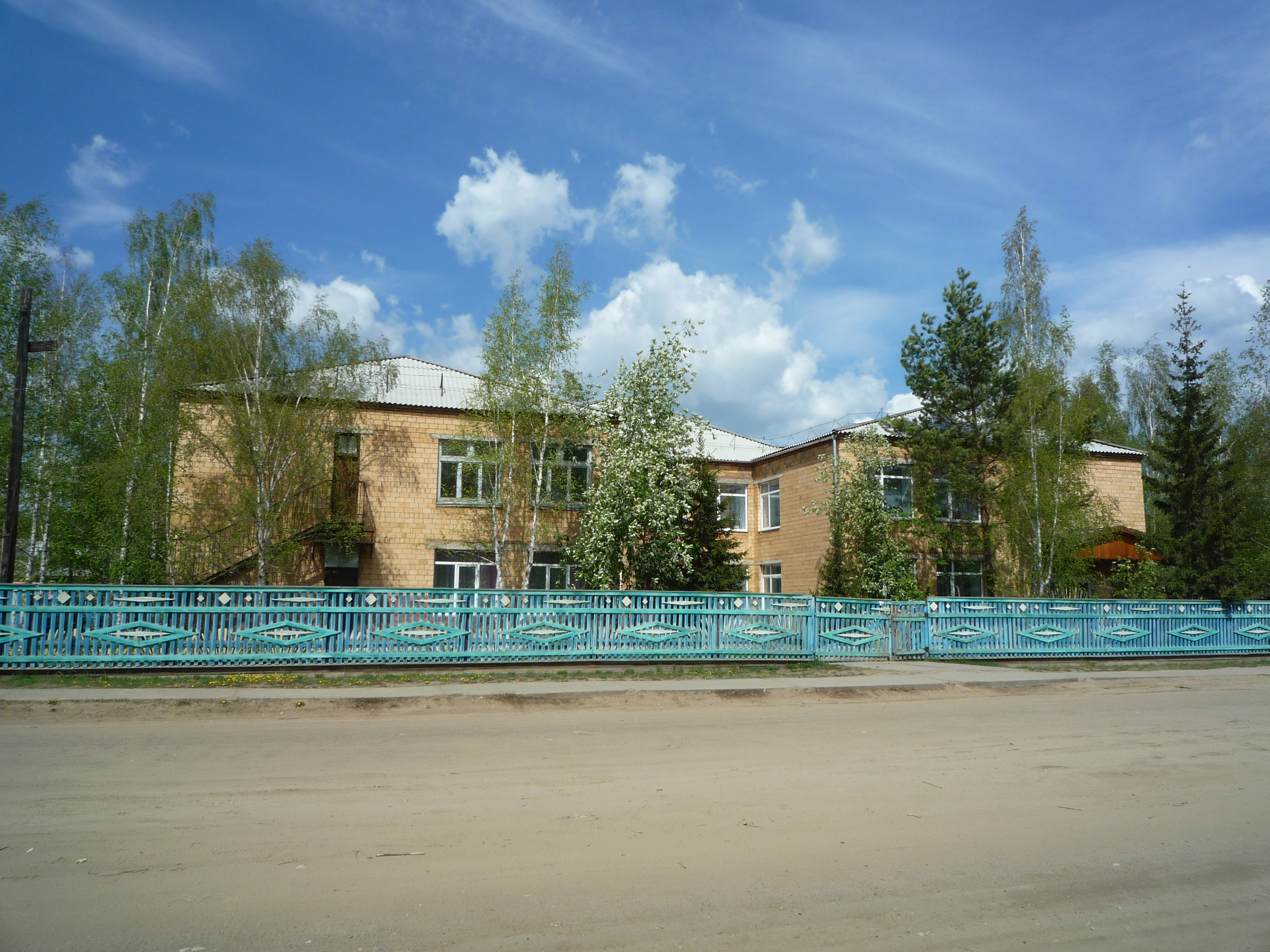
Kindergarten

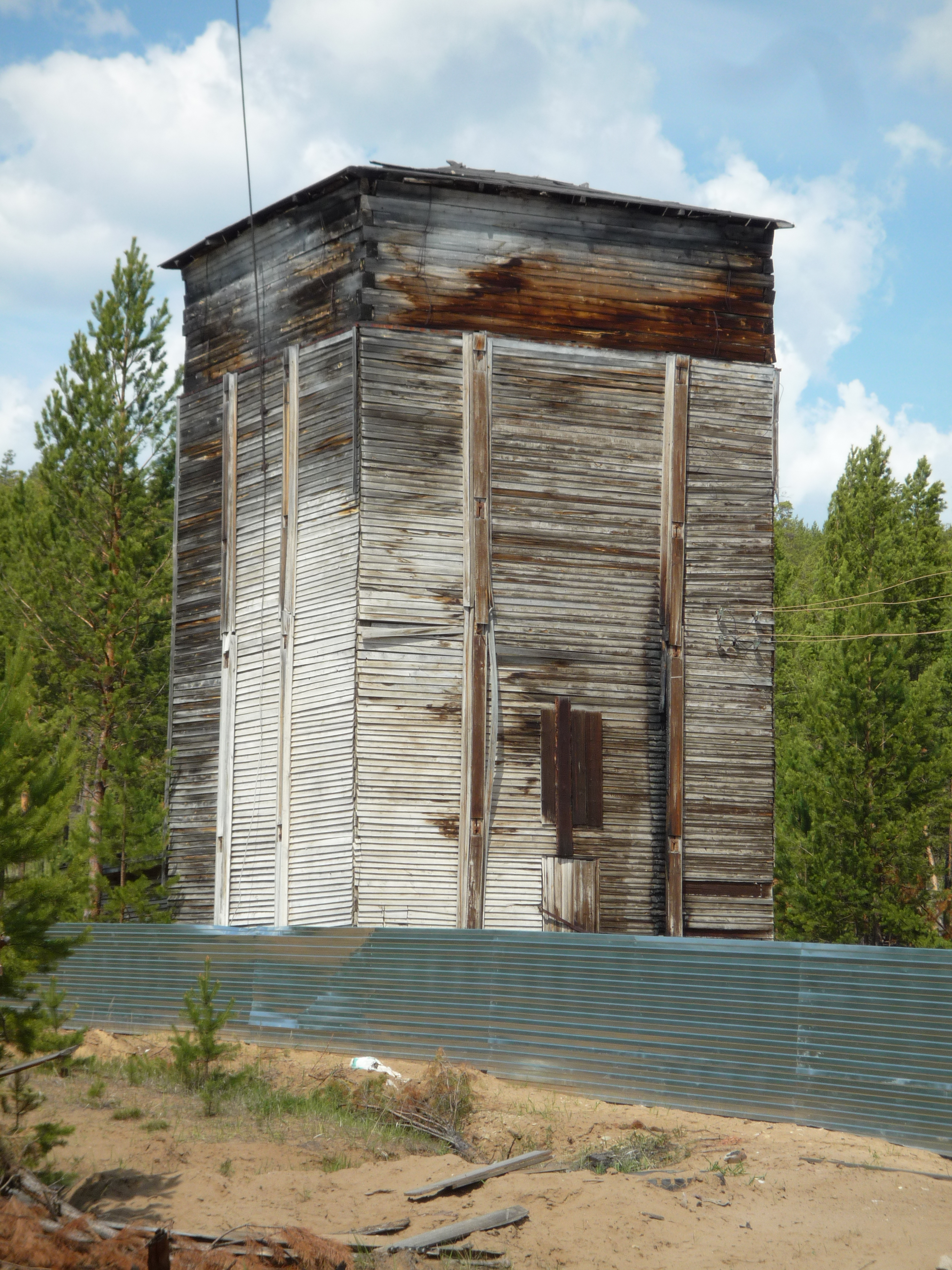
Pump-house

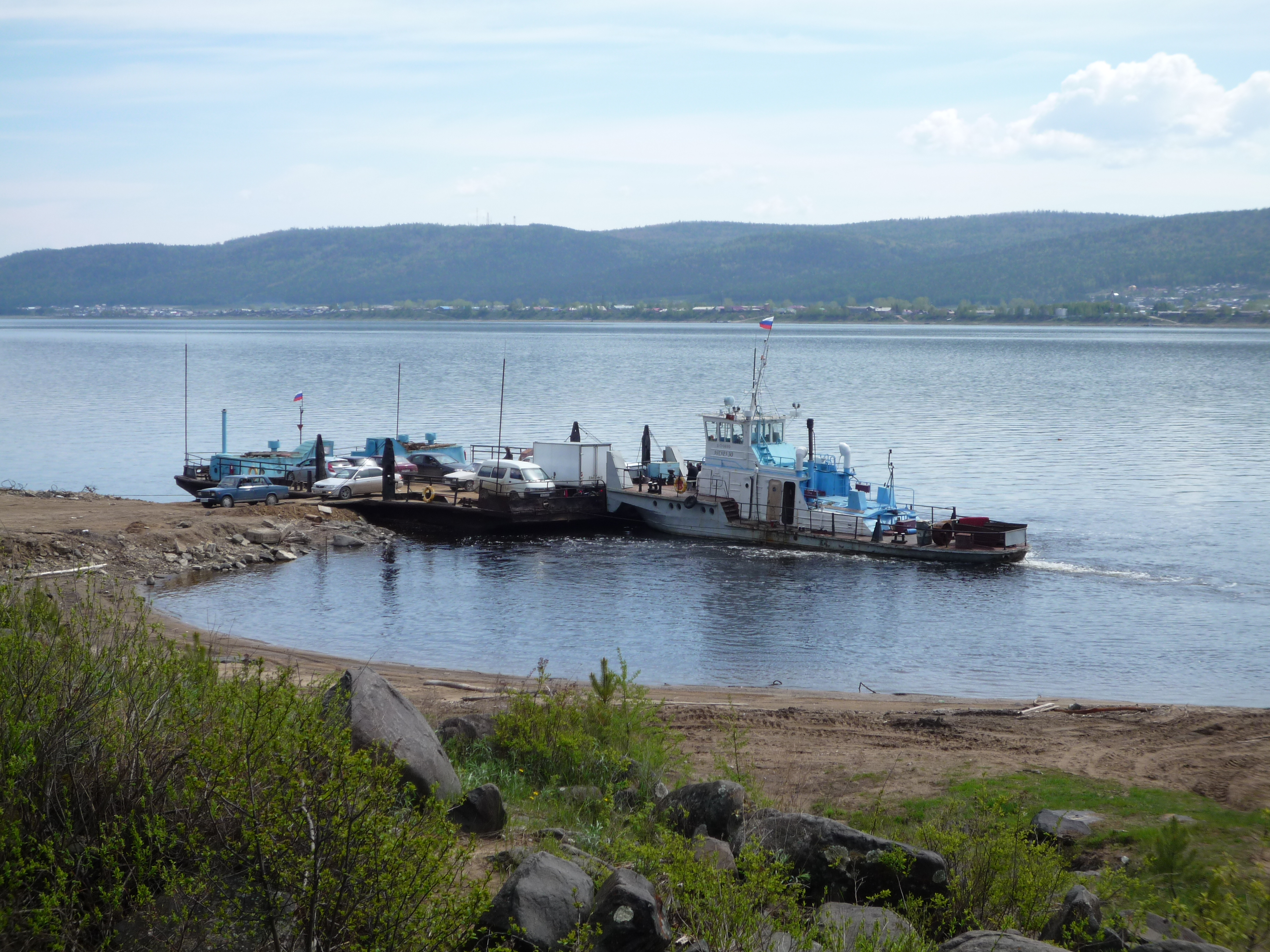
Dock
