= Boguchansky =

Boguchansky (masculine), Boguchanskaya (feminine), or Boguchanskoye (neuter) may refer to:

- Boguchansky District, a district of Krasnoyarsk Krai, Russia
- Boguchany (Boguchanskaya) Dam, a power station in Russia
