= Nikolai Usenko =

Nikolai Ilyich Usenko
- Николай Ильич Усенко
- Born: 22 December 1924; Kamenka village, Irbeysky District, Krasnoyarsk Krai, Russian SFSR, USSR
- Died: March 12, 1996 (aged 71); Krasnoyarsk, Russian Federation
- Military career
- Allegiance: Soviet Union
- Branch: Red Army
- Service years: 1942–1944
- Rank: Red Army man
- Unit: 3rd Guards Airborne Division
- Conflicts: World War II
- Awards: Hero of the Soviet Union; Order of Lenin; Order of the Patriotic War, 1st class

Nikolai Ilyich Usenko (Russia: Николай Ильич Усенко; 22 December 1924 – 21 March 1996) was a Red Army man and Hero of the Soviet Union. Usenko was awarded the title on 10 January 1944 for his actions during the Battle of the Dnieper in October 1943. During the battle, Usenko, a telephonist, was reported to have repaired numerous breaks in the line, often under German fire. He was also reported to have killed 25 German soldiers. Later he was seriously wounded and blinded by a German shell and medically retired from the Red Army. He subsequently returned to his home in Krasnoyarsk Krai and worked in the logging industry.

== Early life ==
Usenko was born on 22 December 1924 in Kamenka village in the Irbeysky District of Krasnoyarsk Krai to a peasant family. In 1930, his family was dispossessed and as special settlers relocated to the village of Kosoy Byk in the Kezhemsky District. After the completion of his six classes of school, he worked as a lumberjack as well as a raftsman on the Angara River.

== World War II ==
In October 1942, he was drafted into the Red Army. He became a telephonist and was sent to the Northwestern Front as part of a ski brigade, which was merged into the 3rd Guards Airborne Division. Usenko served with the division's 8th Guards Airborne Regiment from January 1943 on. He fought in the Demyansk Offensive from 15 to 28 February and the Staraya Russa Offensive from 4 to 19 March. In April 1943 the division was withdrawn into the Reserve of the Supreme High Command. One month later it became part of the Central Front. In July, Usenko fought in the Battle of Kursk as well as the subsequent Operation Kutuzov as part of his division.

During the Chernigov-Pripyat Offensive in the Battle of the Dnieper, Usenko helped to defend the division's bridgehead on the right bank of the Dnieper. Usenko repaired 12 breaks on the telephone line during German air raids on 4 October. On 5 October, Usenko attempted to repair the line again and encountered a group of German soldiers, of whom he reportedly killed 25 with three hand grenades. The next day he provided communications between the battalion commander and its companies, by personally delivering a report to the battalion commander through the German lines. His actions were able to save the battalion from encirclement by German troops. On the same day, he was seriously injured and blinded by a German artillery shell. For these actions he was later awarded the Hero of the Soviet Union title and the Order of Lenin on 10 January 1944.

After six months of treatment, Usenko was discharged from the Red Army in April 1944 for being medically unfit.

== Later life ==
After being discharged he returned to Kezhemsky District and lived in Kosoy Byk. Usenko worked in the Dvoretskiy Lesopunkt (logging area) of the Kezhemsky District logging industry. He retired in 1976 and lived in Krasnoyarsk. In 1985, Usenko was awarded the Order of the Patriotic War 1st class, along with all other surviving veterans. He died on 21 March 1996 and was buried in the Badalykskoe Cemetery in Kransnoyarsk.

Two streets in Kodinsk and Kamenka were named in his honor.
