= Koda (Russia) =

Location
- Country: Russia

Physical characteristics
- Mouth: Angara
  - coordinates: 58.668°N 99.375°E
- Length: 283 km (176 mi)
- Basin size: 3,890 km^{2} (1,500 sq mi)

Basin features
- Progression: Angara→ Yenisey→ Kara Sea

The Koda (Russian: Кода) is a tributary on the right (north) side of the Angara, 13 km northeast of the city of Kodinsk, in the Kezhemsky District of Krasnoyarsk Krai, Russia. It is 283 kilometres (176 mi) long, and has a drainage basin of 3,890 square kilometres (1,500 sq mi).

The river gave the name to the town of Kodinsk. It is claimed to derive from the Evenki word kada, meaning "cliff".

A seasonal settlement of the same name was the headquarters for the construction of the Boguchany Dam across the Angara, starting 1975. With the filling of the reservoir in 2012, the lower 30 km of the Koda river valley were flooded and are now a branch of the dam's reservoir.

The region has yielded prehistoric remains.
