= Kezhemsky =

Kezhemsky (masculine), Kezhemskaya (feminine), or Kezhemskoye (neuter) may refer to:

- Kezhemsky District, a district of Krasnoyarsk Krai, Russia
- Kezhemsky (rural locality), a rural locality (a settlement) in Irkutsk Oblast, Russia
