= Boguchany Aluminium Smelter =

Plant under construction in Krasnoyarsk Krai, Russia

Coordinates: 58.079°N 97.325°E

Boguchany Aluminium Smelter Богучанский алюминиевый завод
- Industry: Mining; Metallurgy
- Headquarters: Tayozhny, Boguchansky District, Krasnoyarsk Krai
- Products: Aluminium; Aluminium alloys
- Owner: RUSAL 50%, RusHydro 50%

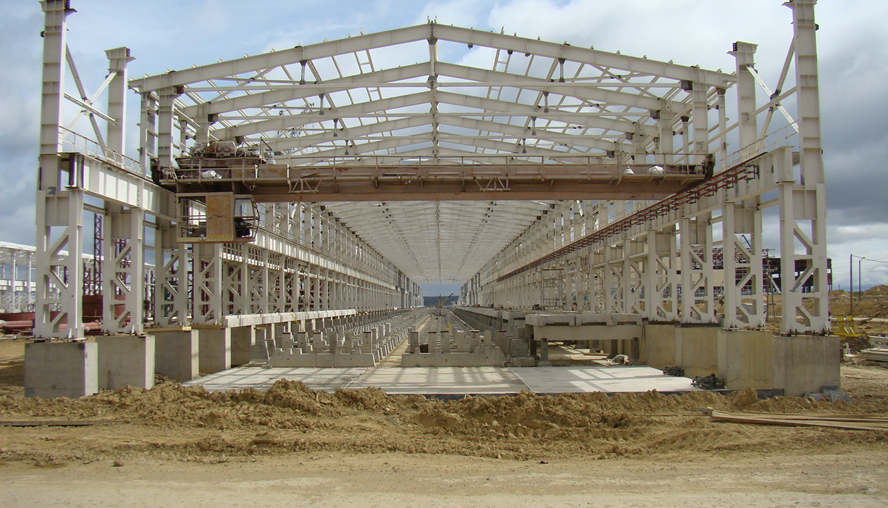
The construction of potroom#1 of Boguchansk Aluminium Smelter in Krasnoyarsk Region, Russia

Boguchany Aluminium Smelter (Russian: Богуча́нский алюми́ниевый заво́д, Boguchanskiy Alyuminiyevy Zavod) is a Russian aluminium smelter currently being constructed near the settlement of Tayozhny, in the Boguchansky District of Krasnoyarsk Krai. It is one of the largest development projects of the Rusal company, which is building this new aluminium plant in partnership with hydroelectricity producer RusHydro. Each side owns a 50% stake in the Boguchany Energo-Metallurgical Union (Russian: Богучанское энерго-металлургическое объединение, or Russian: БЭМО, BEMO), a company that governs the construction of the new smelter, which is expected to use the energy from RusHydro's Boguchany Dam.

The project capacity of the plant is 600,000 tons of aluminium per year.

The smelter was launched in 2016.
