= Boguchansky District =

Boguchansky District Богучанский район (Russian)
- District
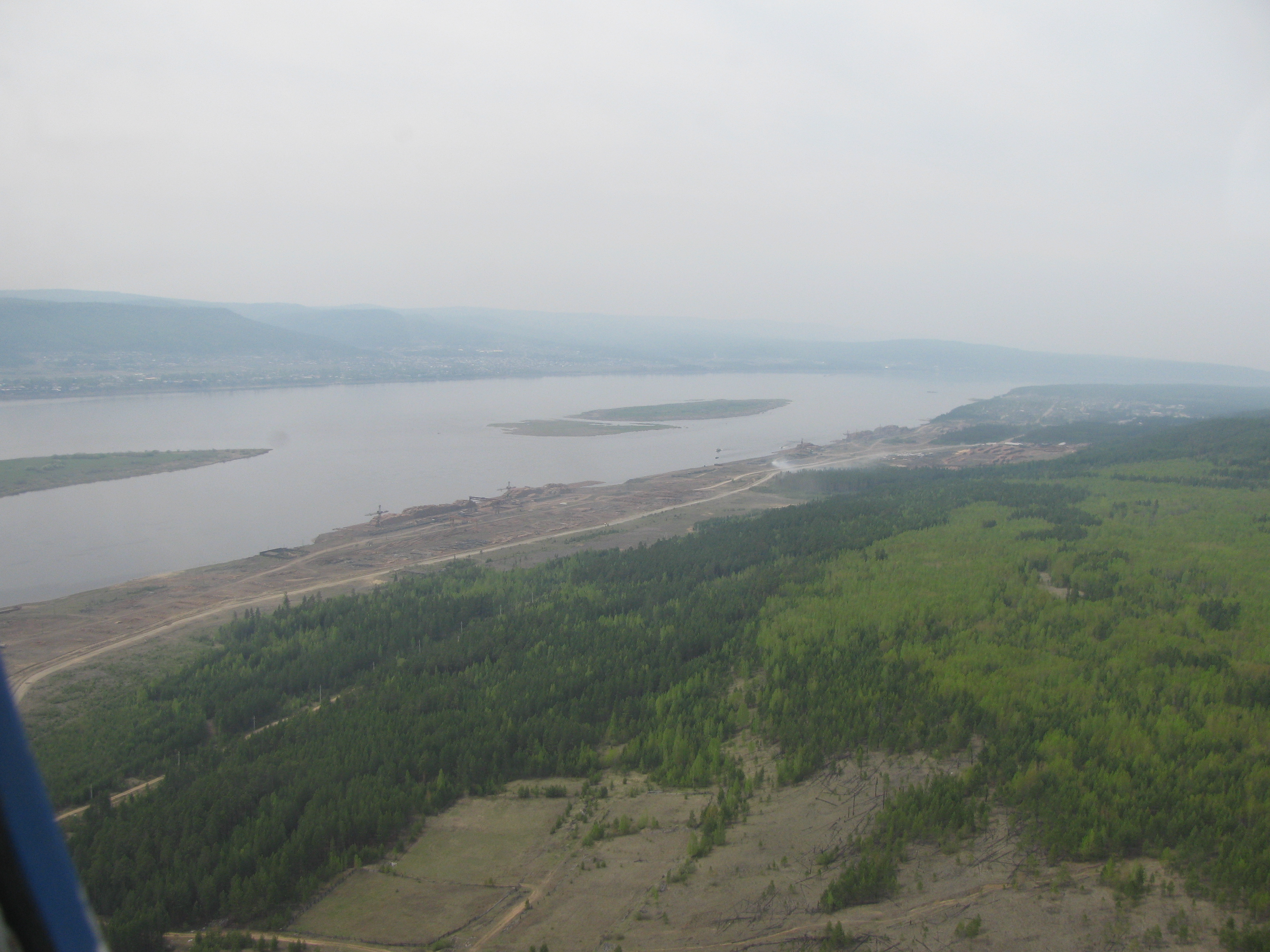
- The Angara River near the selo of Boguchany in Boguchansky District

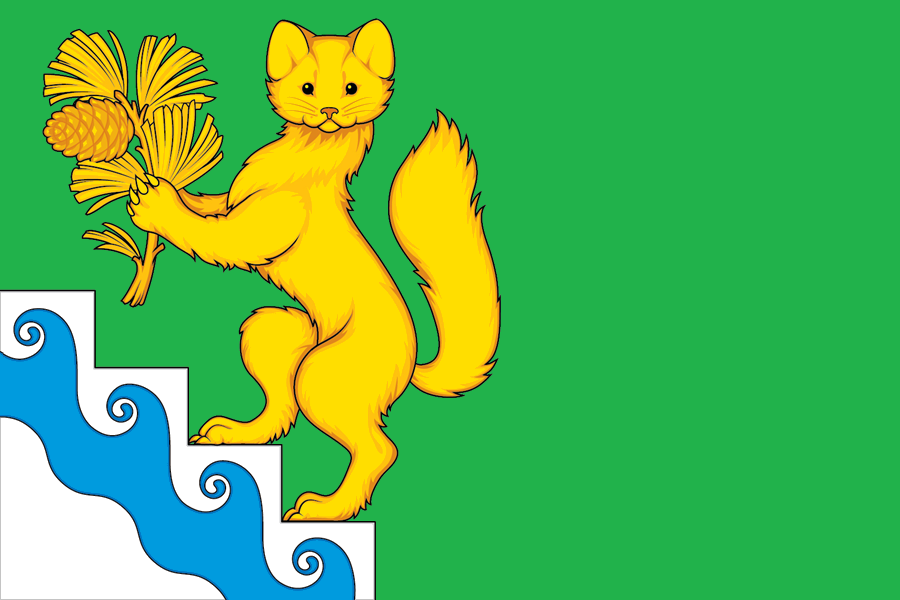
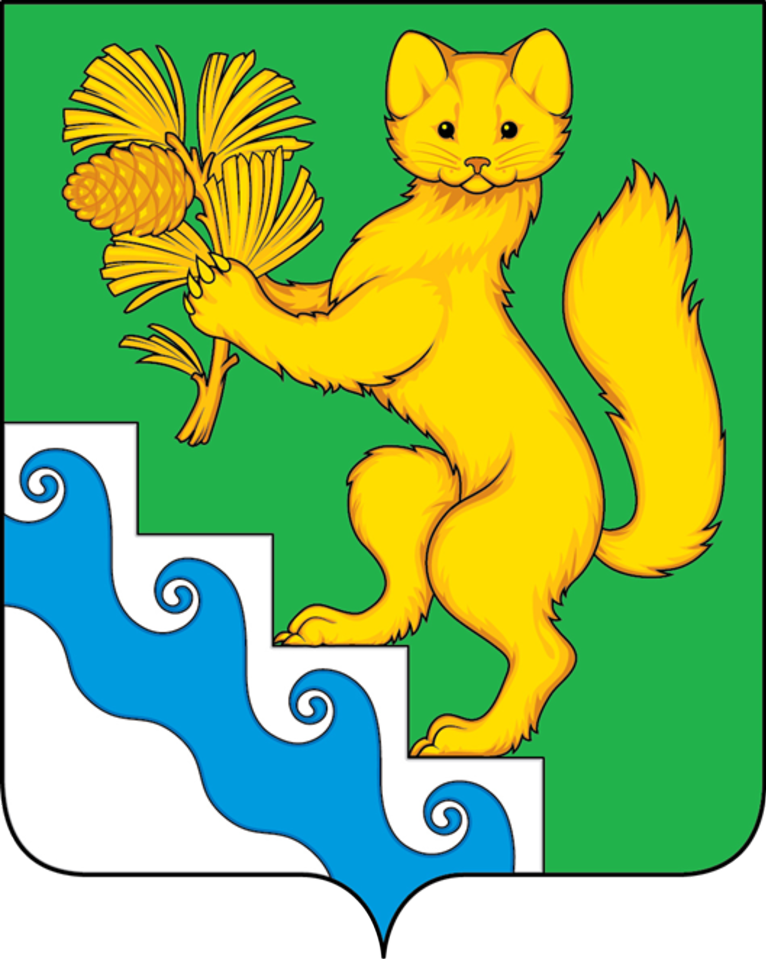
- Flag Coat of arms
- Location of Boguchansky District in Krasnoyarsk Krai
- Coordinates: 58°22′43″N 97°26′08″E
- Country: Russia
- Federal subject: Krasnoyarsk Krai
- Established: July 4, 1927
- Administrative center: Boguchany

Government
  - Type: Local government
  - Body: Boguchansky District Council of Deputies
  - Head: Alexander V. Bakhtin

Area
  - Total: 53,985 km^{2} (20,844 sq mi)

Population (2010 Census)
  - Total: 47,968
  - Density: 0.88854/km^{2} (2.3013/sq mi)
  - Urban: 0%
  - Rural: 100%

Administrative structure
  - Administrative divisions: 18 Selsoviets
  - Inhabited localities: 29 rural localities

Municipal structure
  - Municipally incorporated as: Boguchansky Municipal District
  - Municipal divisions: 0 urban settlements, 18 rural settlements
- Time zone: UTC+7 (MSK+4)
- OKTMO ID: 04609000
- Website: http://my.krskstate.ru/docs/regions/boguchanskiy-rayon/

Boguchansky District (Russian: Богуча́нский райо́н) is an administrative and municipal district (raion), one of the forty-three in Krasnoyarsk Krai, Russia. It is located in the east of the krai and borders with Evenkiysky District in the north, Kezhemsky District in the east, Irkutsk Oblast in the southeast, Abansky District in the south, Taseyevsky District in the southwest, and with Motyginsky District in the west. The area of the district is 53,985 square kilometers (20,844 sq mi). Its administrative center is the rural locality (a selo) of Boguchany. Population: 47,968 (2010 census); 50,503 (2002 Census); 58,235 (1989 Soviet census). The population of Boguchany accounts for 23.4% of the district's total population.

Historical population
Year	Pop.	±%
1970	34,290	—
1979	51,669	+50.7%
1989	58,235	+12.7%
2002	50,503	−13.3%
2010	47,968	−5.0%
Source: Census data

== Geography ==
The district is situated in the Angara River basin. From north to south, the district stretches for 280 kilometers (170 mi).

== History ==
The district was founded on July 4, 1927.

== Government ==
The Head of the district is Alexander Medvedev.

== Demographics ==
As of the 2002 Census, the ethnic composition of the population was as follows:

- Russians: 86.4%
- Germans: 6.3%
- Chuvash: 1.8%
- Ukrainians: 1.4%
- Mordvins: 0.7%
- Belarusians: 0.6%
- Tatars: 0.5%
- Khakas: 0.1%

In 2009, the rate of the natural decline of the district population was 4.3 persons per 1,000 in 2006, which is in sharp contrast with the krai's average growth of 0.2 persons per 1,000.

== Economy ==
- Boguchany Dam, launched in October 2012
- Boguchany Aluminium Smelter, scheduled to open in 2013
