= Boguchany (rural locality) =

Boguchany Богучаны
- Selo
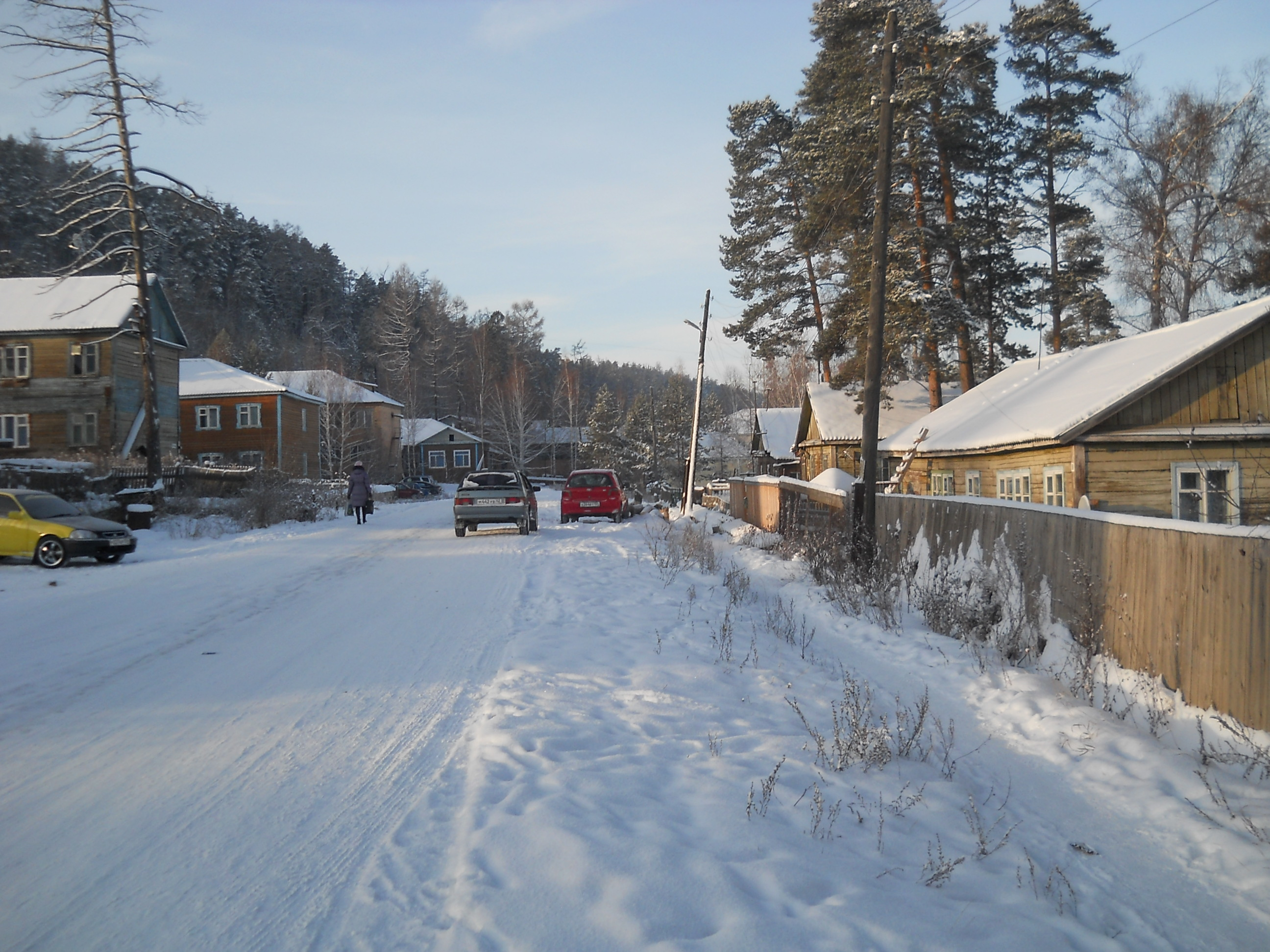

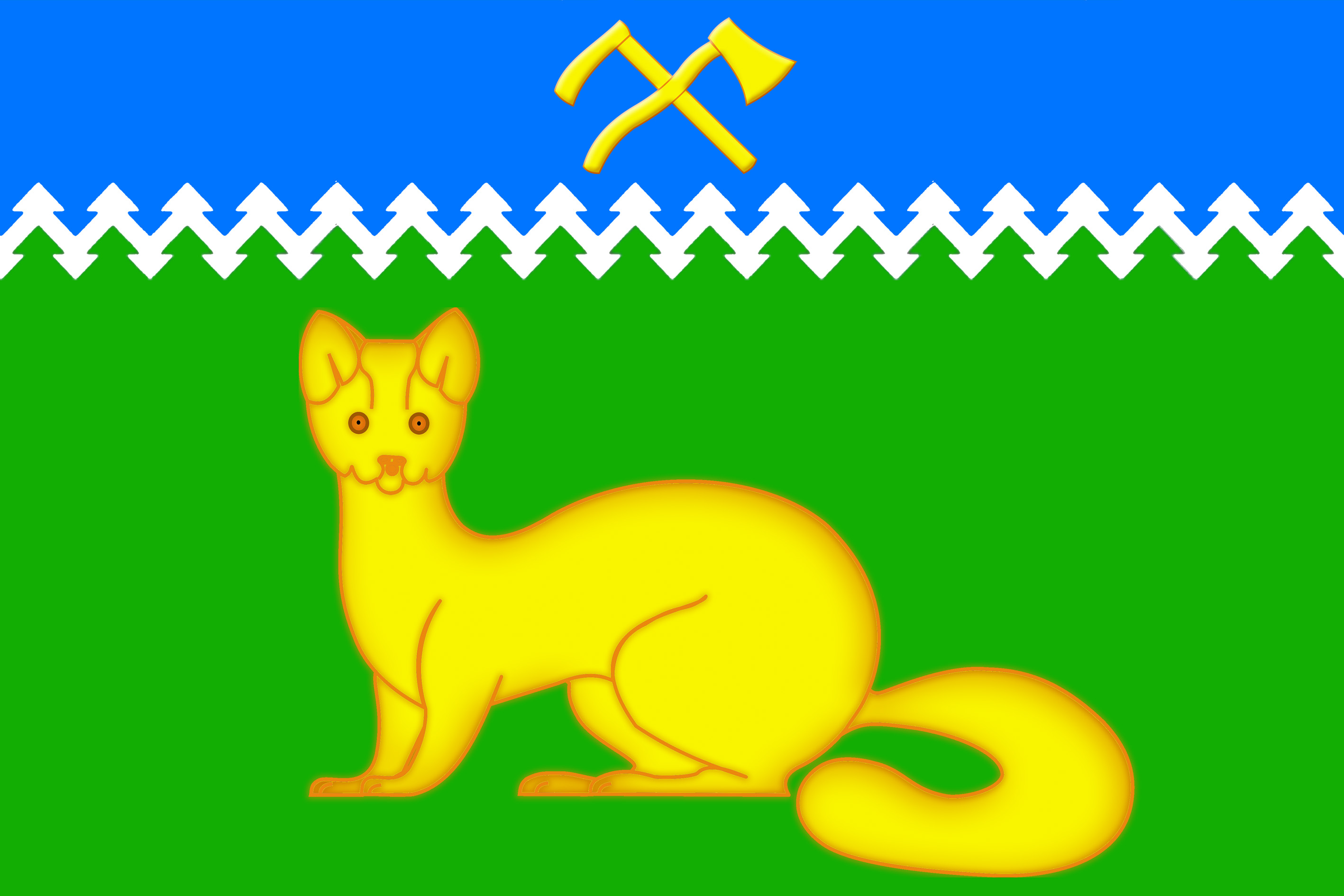
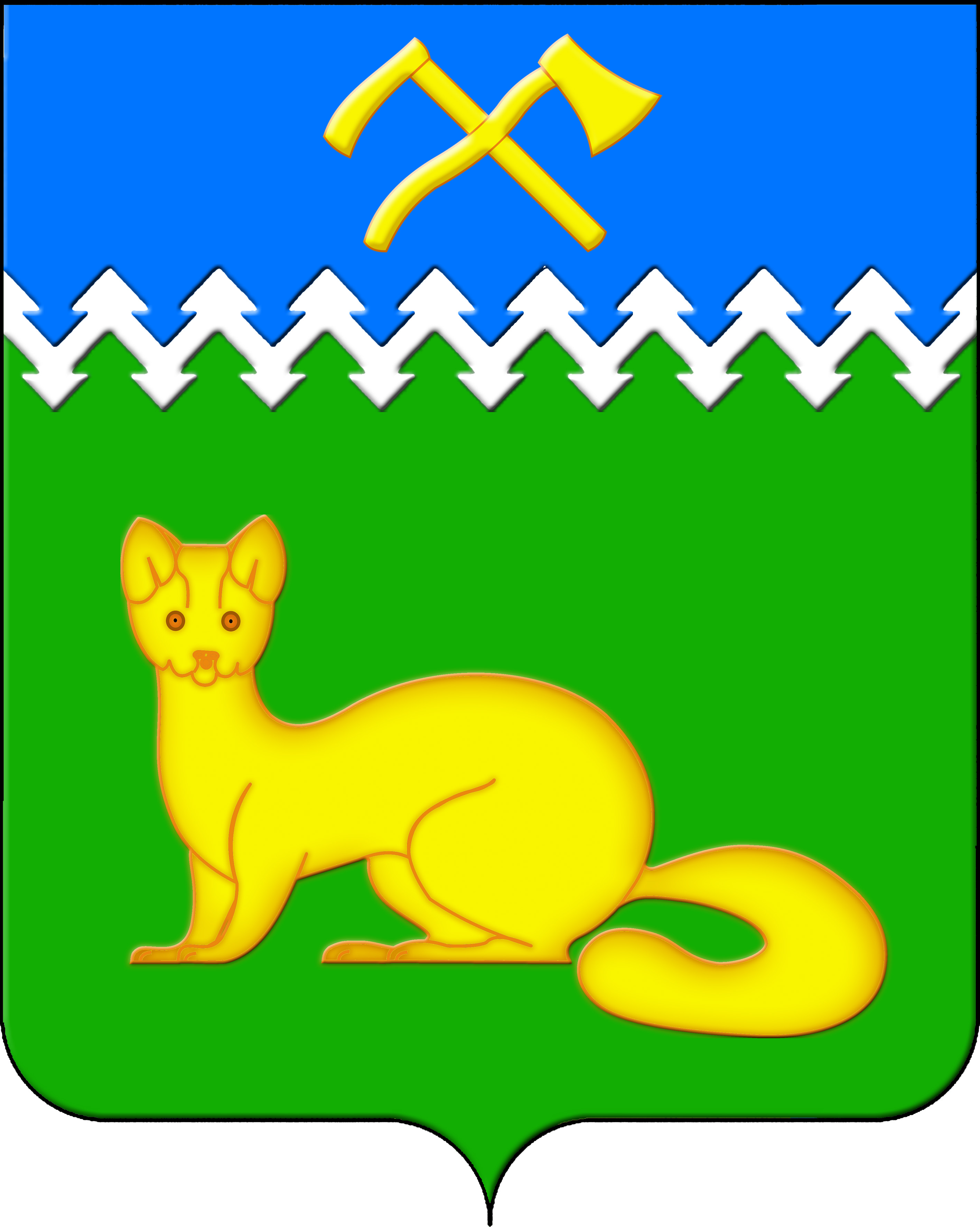
- Flag Coat of arms
- Interactive map of Boguchany
- Location of Boguchany Boguchany (Krasnoyarsk Krai)
- Coordinates: 58°22′N 97°27′E
- Country: Russia
- Federal subject: Krasnoyarsk Krai
- Administrative district: Boguchansky District
- Founded: 1642
- Elevation: 131 m (430 ft)

Population (2010 Census)
  - Total: 11,232
  - Estimate (2010): 11,232 (0%)

Administrative status
  - Capital of: Boguchansky District
- Time zone: UTC+7 (MSK+4)
- Postal code: 663430
- OKTMO ID: 04609410101

Boguchany (Russian: Богуча́ны) is a rural locality (a selo) and the administrative center of the Boguchansky District of Krasnoyarsk Krai, Russia, located on the left bank of the Angara River. Population: 11,232 (2010 census); 11,386 (2002 census); 14,433 (1989 Soviet census).

== Transportation ==
Boguchany is served by the Boguchany Airport.

== Climate ==
Boguchany has a subarctic climate (Köppen climate classification Dfc) with severely cold winters and warm summers. Precipitation is quite low, but is somewhat higher from June to September than at other times of the year.

Climate data for Boguchany
Month	Jan	Feb	Mar	Apr	May	Jun	Jul	Aug	Sep	Oct	Nov	Dec	Year
Record high °C (°F)	4.3 (39.7)	7.6 (45.7)	18.0 (64.4)	31.0 (87.8)	34.6 (94.3)	37.7 (99.9)	37.1 (98.8)	35.1 (95.2)	30.6 (87.1)	23.9 (75.0)	9.9 (49.8)	5.1 (41.2)	37.7 (99.9)
Mean daily maximum °C (°F)	−18.5 (−1.3)	−13.3 (8.1)	−2.1 (28.2)	6.3 (43.3)	15.7 (60.3)	22.8 (73.0)	25.8 (78.4)	22.2 (72.0)	13.5 (56.3)	3.8 (38.8)	−7.7 (18.1)	−16.3 (2.7)	4.4 (39.9)
Daily mean °C (°F)	−23.3 (−9.9)	−19.6 (−3.3)	−9.6 (14.7)	0.0 (32.0)	8.4 (47.1)	15.9 (60.6)	19.1 (66.4)	15.7 (60.3)	8.1 (46.6)	−0.2 (31.6)	−11.5 (11.3)	−20.7 (−5.3)	−1.5 (29.3)
Mean daily minimum °C (°F)	−27.6 (−17.7)	−24.8 (−12.6)	−16.1 (3.0)	−5.5 (22.1)	2.2 (36.0)	9.7 (49.5)	13.2 (55.8)	10.3 (50.5)	4.1 (39.4)	−3.3 (26.1)	−14.9 (5.2)	−24.8 (−12.6)	−6.5 (20.3)
Record low °C (°F)	−53.5 (−64.3)	−51.7 (−61.1)	−43.9 (−47.0)	−32.8 (−27.0)	−14.7 (5.5)	−5.3 (22.5)	1.8 (35.2)	−1.9 (28.6)	−9.4 (15.1)	−28.3 (−18.9)	−48.7 (−55.7)	−51.4 (−60.5)	−53.5 (−64.3)
Average precipitation mm (inches)	16 (0.6)	13 (0.5)	12 (0.5)	20 (0.8)	29 (1.1)	45 (1.8)	52 (2.0)	50 (2.0)	45 (1.8)	31 (1.2)	27 (1.1)	21 (0.8)	361 (14.2)
Average rainy days	0.3	0.2	2	10	17	18	15	16	18	14	3	0.3	114
Average snowy days	24	22	18	14	5	0.3	0	0.1	3	18	25	25	154
Average relative humidity (%)	79	76	70	61	58	63	67	72	74	74	78	79	71
Mean monthly sunshine hours	30	87	164	212	243	278	292	223	142	79	43	14	1,807
Source 1: Pogoda.ru.net
Source 2: NOAA (sun, 1961–1990)
