= Kezhemsky (rural locality) =

Kezhemsky Кежемский
- Settlement
- Interactive map of Kezhemsky
- Location of Kezhemsky Kezhemsky (Irkutsk Oblast)
- Coordinates: 56°14′N 102°29′E
- Country: Russia
- Federal subject: Irkutsk Oblast
- Administrative district: Bratsky District

Population
  - Estimate (2012): 1,635 )
- Time zone: UTC+8 (MSK+5)
- Postal code: 665790
- OKTMO ID: 25604413101

Kezhemsky (Russian: Кежемский) is a rural locality (a settlement) in Bratsky District of Irkutsk Oblast, Russia.
