= Kodinsk =

Town in Krasnoyarsk Krai, Russia

Kodinsk Кодинск
- Town
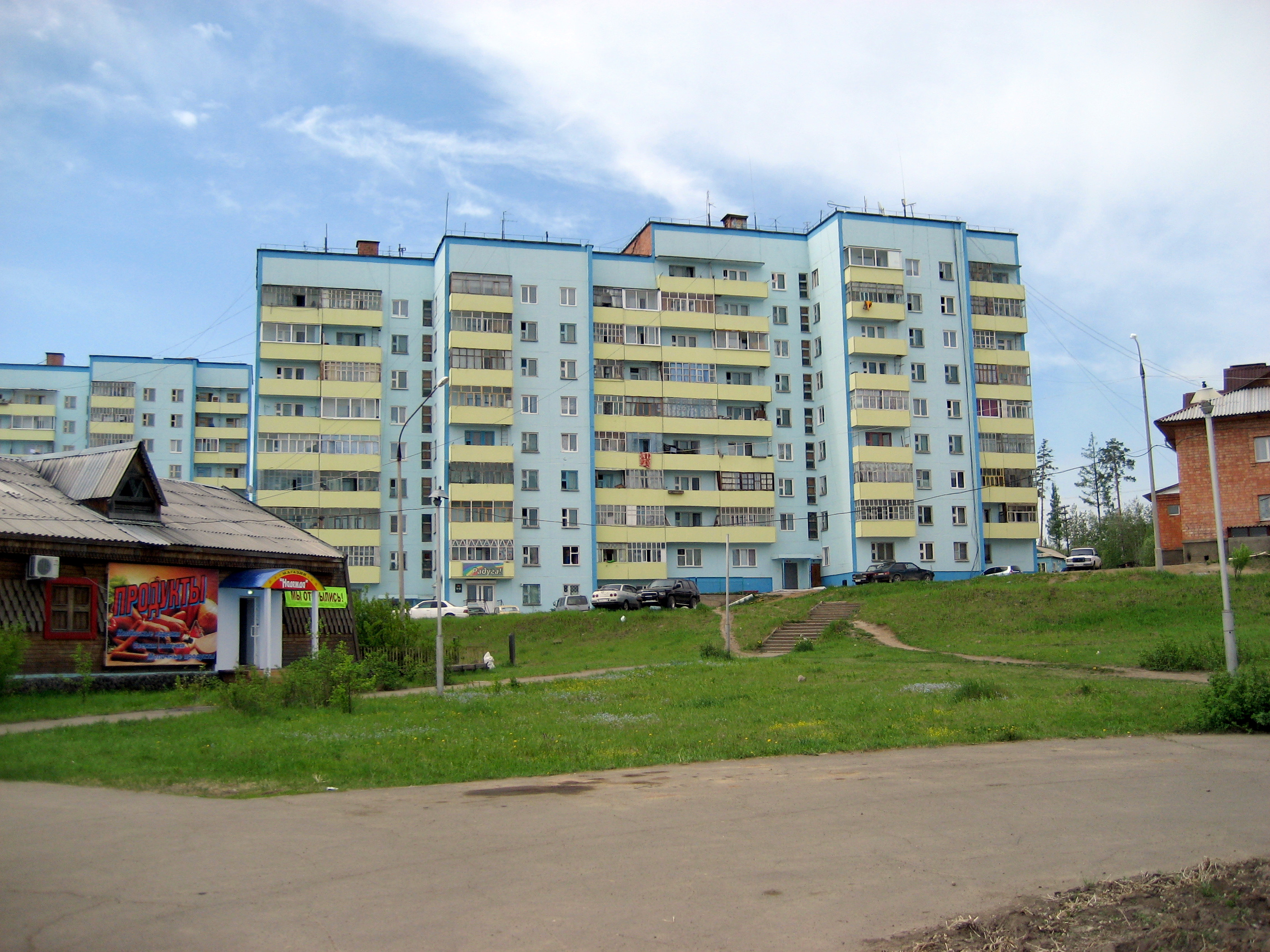
- In Kodinsk

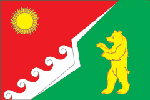
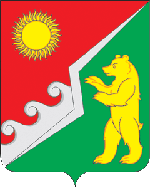
- Flag Coat of arms
- Interactive map of Kodinsk
- Location of Kodinsk Kodinsk (Krasnoyarsk Krai)
- Coordinates: 58°41′N 99°11′E
- Country: Russia
- Federal subject: Krasnoyarsk Krai
- Administrative district: Kezhemsky District
- District townSelsoviet: Kodinsk
- Founded: 1977
- Town status since: 1989
- Elevation: 160 m (520 ft)

Population (2010 Census)
  - Total: 14,830
  - Estimate (2021): 13,324 (−10.2%)

Administrative status
  - Capital of: Kezhemsky District, district town of Kodinsk

Municipal status
  - Municipal district: Kezhemsky Municipal District
  - Urban settlement: Kodinsk Urban Settlement
  - Capital of: Kezhemsky Municipal District, Kodinsk Urban Settlement
- Time zone: UTC+7 (MSK+4)
- Postal code: 663470
- OKTMO ID: 04624101001
- Website: www.admkodinsk.ru

Kodinsk (Russian: Коди́нск) is a town and the administrative center of Kezhemsky District of Krasnoyarsk Krai, Russia, located on the Angara River, 735 kilometers (457 mi) north of Krasnoyarsk. Population: 14,830 (2010 census); 14,746 (2002 census); 14,050 (1989 Soviet census).

== History ==
It was founded in 1977 as the settlement of Kodinskoye (Коди́нское) servicing the construction of the Boguchanskaya hydroelectric power station; the name is after the Koda River, a tributary of the Angara that ends about 12 km northeast of the town. The name Koda in turn is derived from Evenki word kada, meaning "cliff". It was granted urban-type settlement status in 1978 and town status in 1989.

== Administrative and municipal status ==
Within the framework of administrative divisions, Kodinsk serves as the administrative center of Kezhemsky District. As an administrative division, it is, together with the village of Syromolotovo, incorporated within Kezhemsky District as the district town of Kodinsk. As a municipal division, the district town of Kodinsk is incorporated within Kezhemsky Municipal District as Kodinsk Urban Settlement.
