= Boguchany Dam =

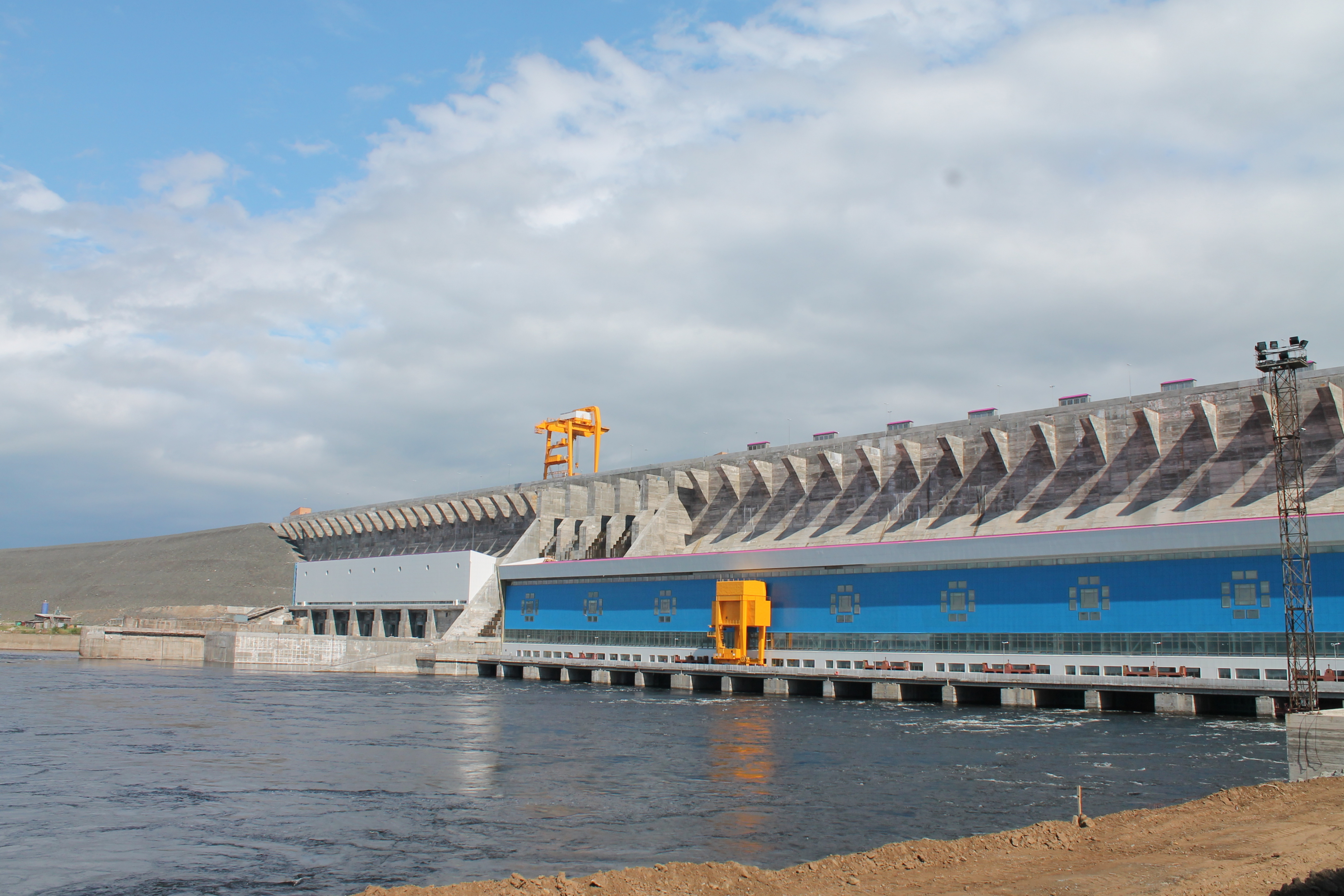

- Location within Russia
- Official name: Богучанская ГЭС
- Country: Russia
- Location: Kodinsk, Krasnoyarsk Krai
- Coordinates: 58°41′41″N 99°08′56″E
- Construction began: 1974
- Opening date: 2012, complete 2015
- Operators: RusHydro and Rusal

Dam and spillways
- Type of dam: Combined gravity and rock-fill dam
- Impounds: Angara River
- Height: 96 m (315 ft)
- Length: 2,587 m (8,488 ft)
- Width (crest): Rock-fill section: 20 m (66 ft)
- Width (base): Rock-fill section: 212 m (696 ft)
- Spillway type: surface-stepped and penstocks, gate-controlled
- Spillway capacity: 11,078 m^{3}/s (391,216 cu ft/s)

Reservoir
- Creates: Boguchany Reservoir
- Total capacity: 58.2 km^{3} (47,183,508 acre⋅ft)
- Active capacity: 2.31 km^{3} (1,872,747 acre⋅ft)
- Catchment area: 831,000 km^{2} (320,851 sq mi)
- Surface area: 2,326 km^{2} (898 sq mi)
- Maximum water depth: 75 m (246 ft)

Power Station
- Operators: RusHydro; Owner: RusHydro/Rusal
- Commission date: 2012
- Hydraulic head: 65.5 m (215 ft)
- Turbines: 9 × 333 MW Francis-type
- Installed capacity: 2,997 MW
- Annual generation: 17.6 TWh

The Boguchany Dam (Russian: Богучанская ГЭС) is a large hydroelectric dam on the Angara River in Kodinsk, Krasnoyarsk Krai, Russia. It has an installed capacity of 2,997 MW. Construction of the power plant was completed when a ninth and final generator was brought online in January 2015.

== History ==
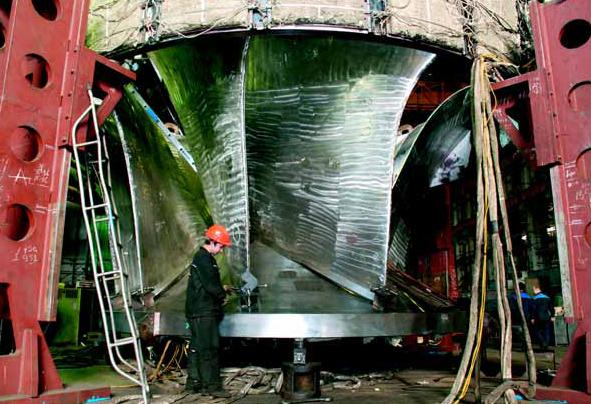
One of the nine turbines of the dam.

Preparatory works for the dam started in 1974, with construction of roads and a support point at the Koda seasonal settlement. The design was performed by Hydroproject in 1976.

Construction of the power station started in 1980 but was suspended in 1994 due to the lack of financing. Work on the project resumed in 2005 when RAO UES (then owner of RusHydro) and Rusal agreed to develop the project jointly. Construction restarted in 2007. The first turbine was dispatched in 2008. The dam began to fill its reservoir in May 2012. The filling required relocating various small settlements and flooded the valleys of several tributaries, including the Koda river.

By August 2012 the first two turbines were installed. They later became operational on 15 October 2012. The third generator began operations later the same month and the fourth was commissioned on 13 January 2013.

== Description ==
The Boguchany Dam is a 2,587 m (8,488 ft) long dam of combined type, which includes reinforced concrete 774 m (2,539 ft) long gravity segment for power station building and 1,813 m (5,948 ft) long rock-fill segment with asphaltene-concrete diaphragm throughout all its length. The dam was equipped with ship lock until 2010, later it was closed and its former location was included in concrete gravity section.

The power station consists of nine Francis turbines with a capacity of 333 MW each. It generates 17.6 TWh of electricity per year. Turbines are manufactured by Power Machines. The power station is owned and operated by JSC Boguchanskaya GES, a joint venture of RusHydro and Rusal, who also built it. Energy from the plant is partly used by the Boguchany Aluminium Smelter.

== Locale ==
Main facilities of the dam are located on the Angara river, in Kodinsk gorge, 444 km upstream from the river mouth, and are surrounded by taiga. The Angara flows in latitudinal direction here, cutting through Cambrian and Ordovician sedimentary massif interspersed with diabase intrusions. The valley's width barely exceeds 1 mile here, with rocky asymmetric bluffs overhanging the riverstream. The region is potentially seismic, with up to 7 degrees MSK-64 earthquake chance (1 in 5000 years possible recurrence).

As it reaches the dam, The Angara's river basin area accounts for 831,000 km3. The river's supply is greatly dependent on the Lake Baikal and superincumbent reservoirs of Irkutsk, Bratsk and Ust-Ilimsk dams. The Angara's discharge amounts to 16,210 m³/s.

The climatic conditions in the vicinity may be described as continental. Summers are short and warm, whilst winters are prolonged and severe. Annual average temperature ranges between −2.6 to −4.3 °С, with the average July high of +18.5 °С and the average January low of −27.4 °С.

== Navigation conditions improvement ==
In 2012, the present design of all dams on the Angara river doesn't allow passage of any ships. Additionally the river was not navigable within the section between Boguchany Dam and Ust-Ilimsk Dam. After its completion in 2012-2013 the reservoir of the Boguchany Dam will be 375 km (233 mi) long and will reach Ust-Ilimsk Dam upstream. It will flood the last section of the Angara channel, which was inaccessible for safe navigation because of shallow rapids in the river.

The downstream part of the river has a shallow channel too and stays unavailable for large seaworthy ships. According to various sources related to this subject, there are plans to build additional dams in the lower part of Angara river or, according to original soviet plans, to build one large hydro power plant in Yenisei River below its join with Angara. The latter variant presumes construction of the largest hydro power plant in Russia with an annual production of over 40 TWh.

== Gallery ==
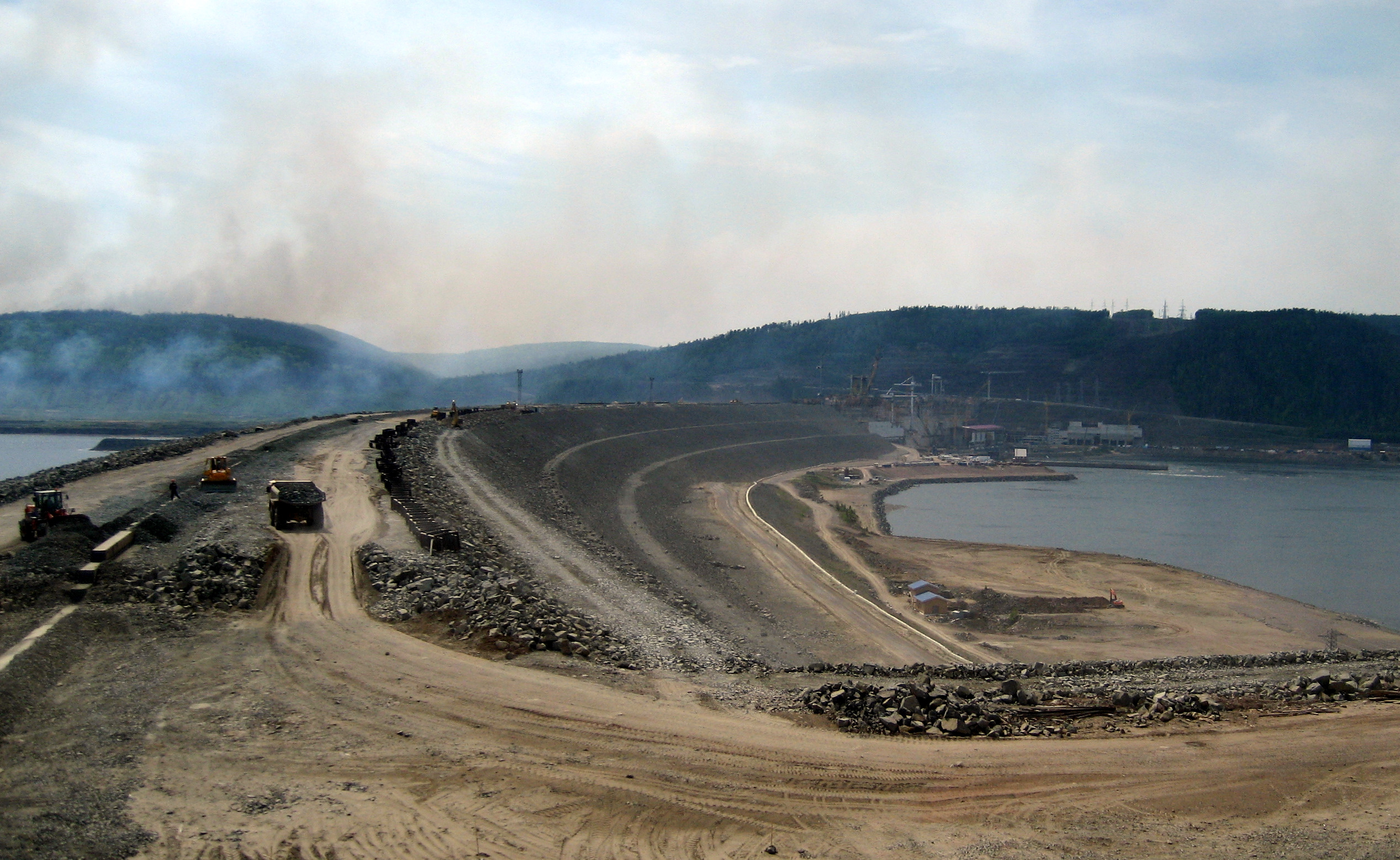
Rock-filled section of the dam in 2011

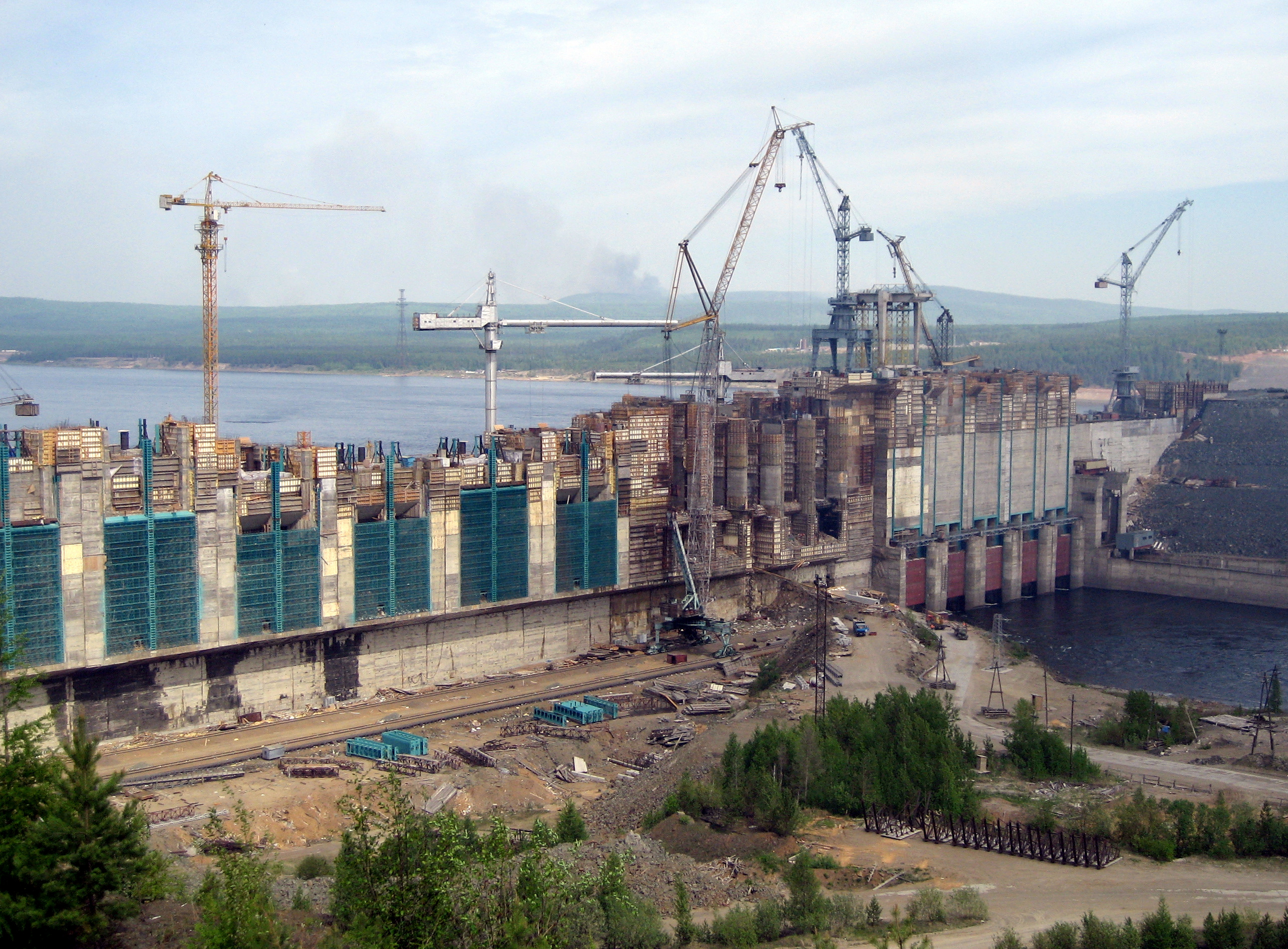
Upstream view in May 2011

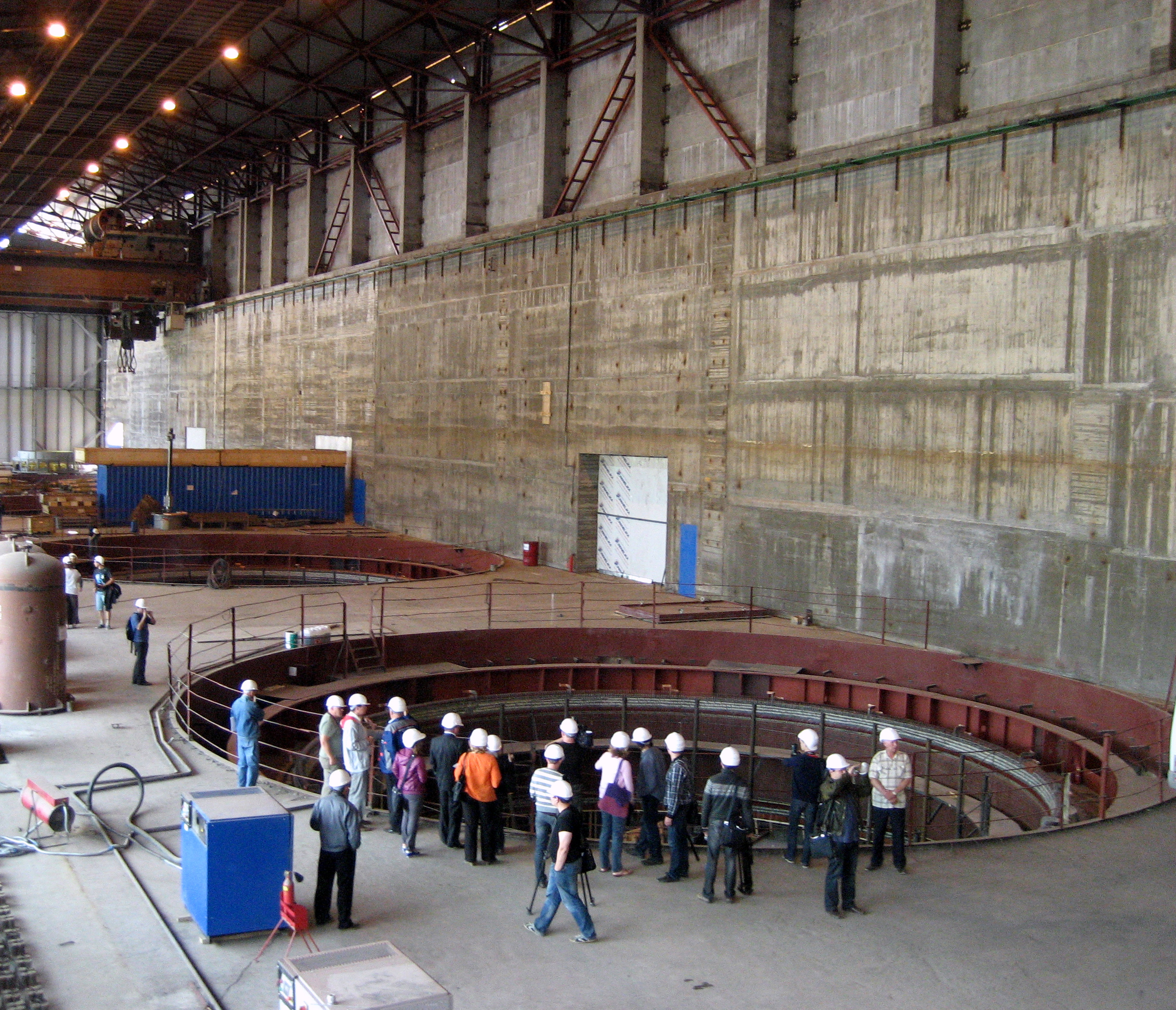
Power station hall

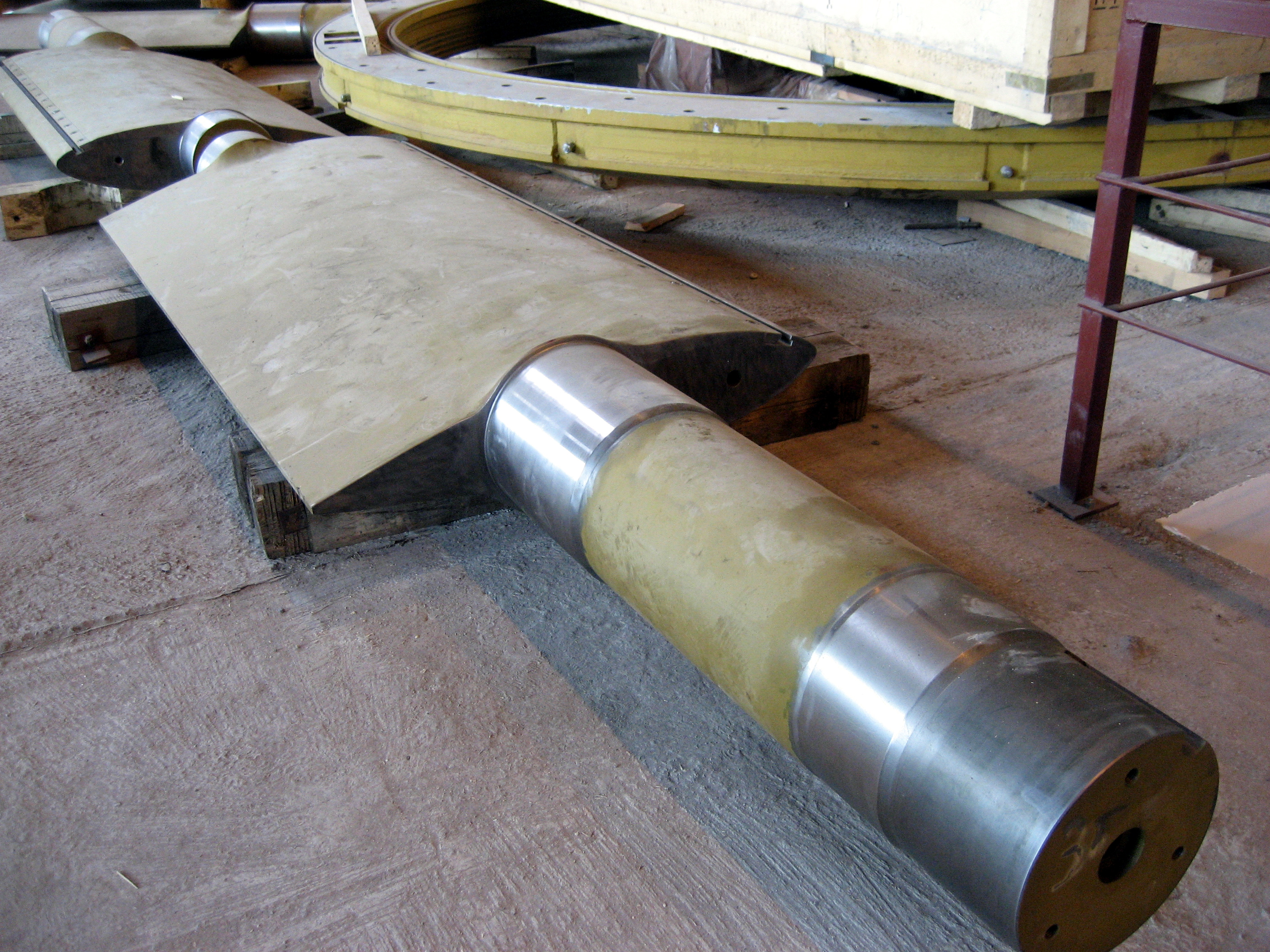
One of the wicket gate blades for the water turbine

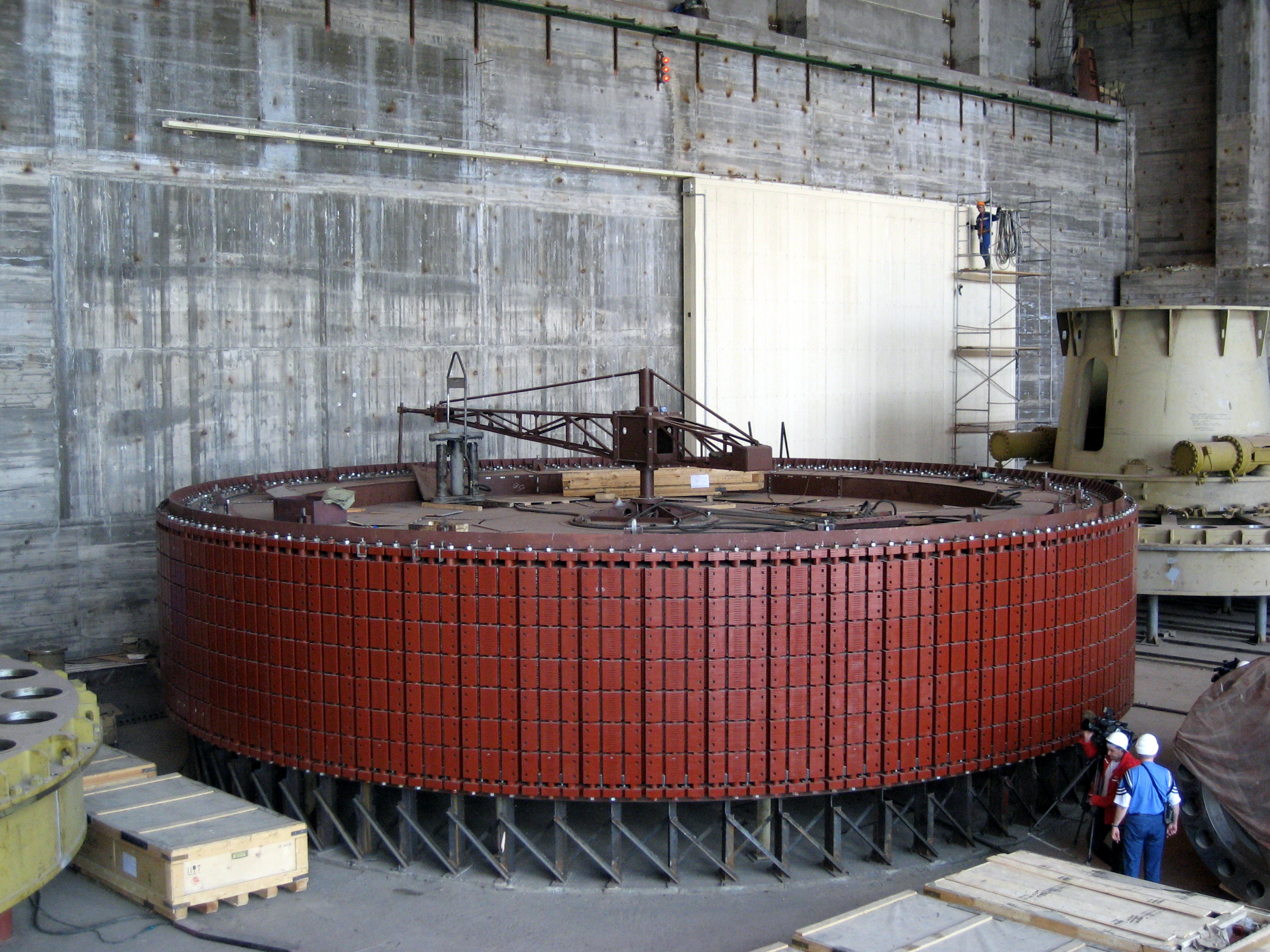
Rotor of one of nine generators

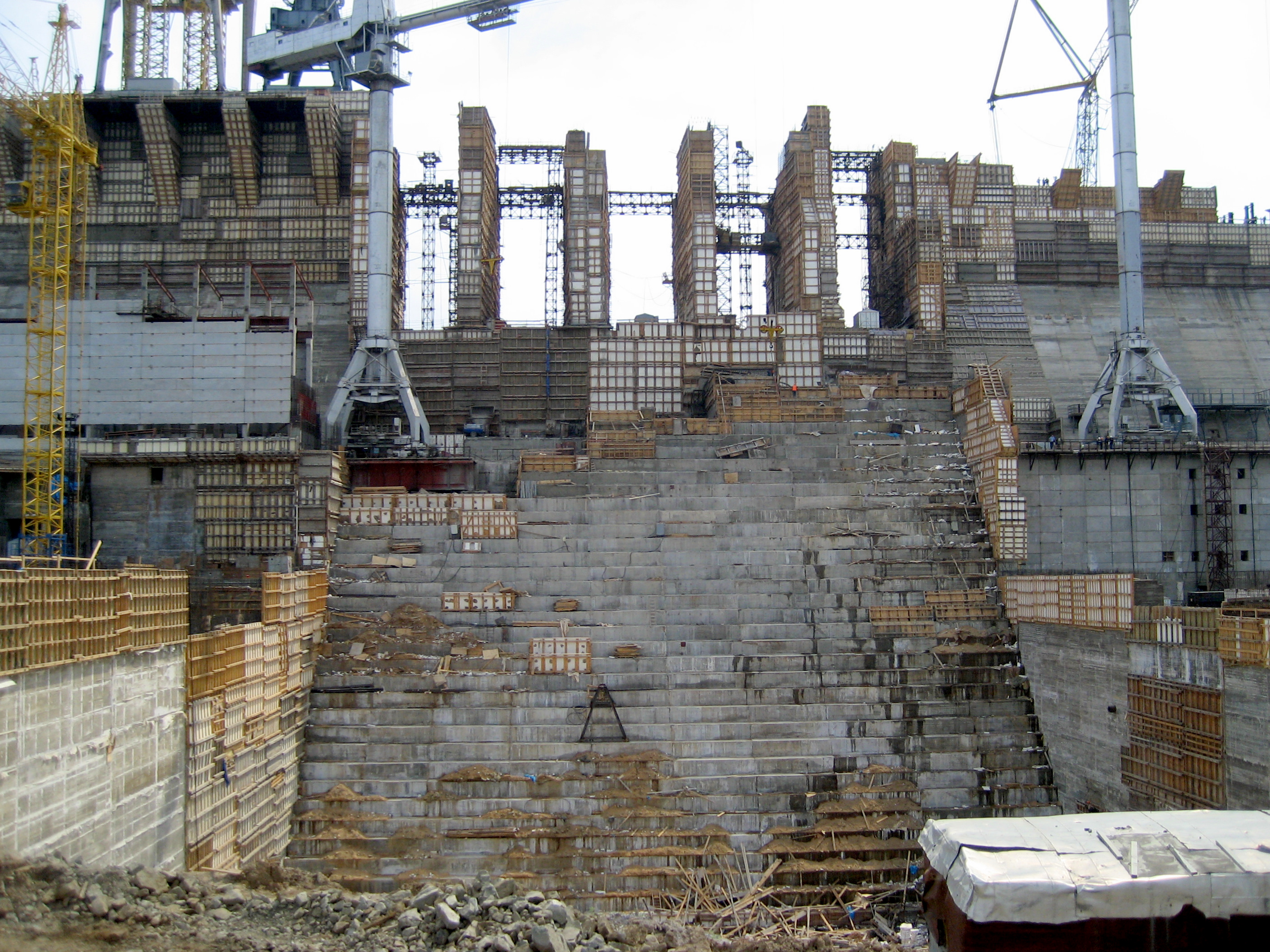
Surface spillway section

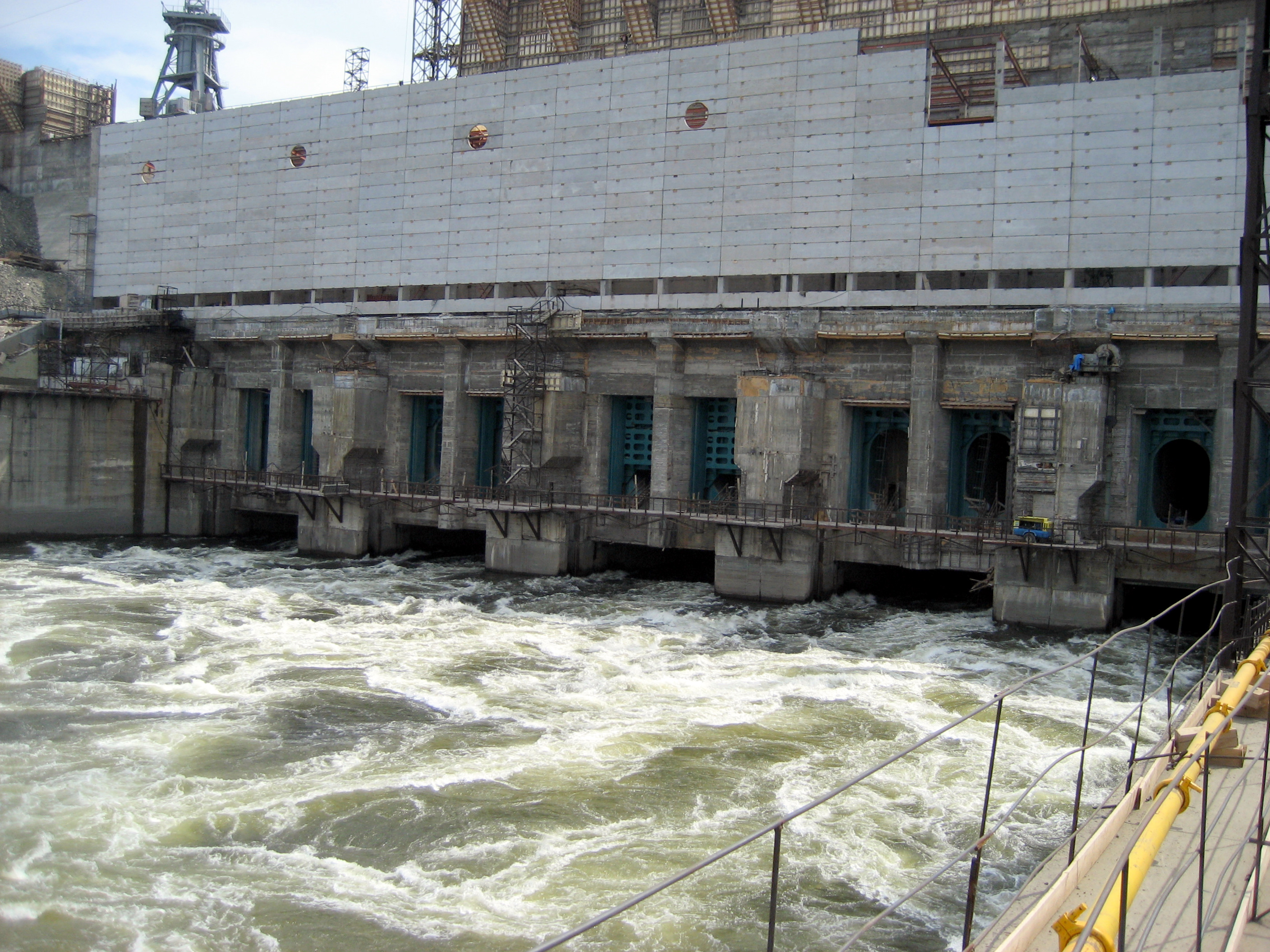
Penstocks spillway section

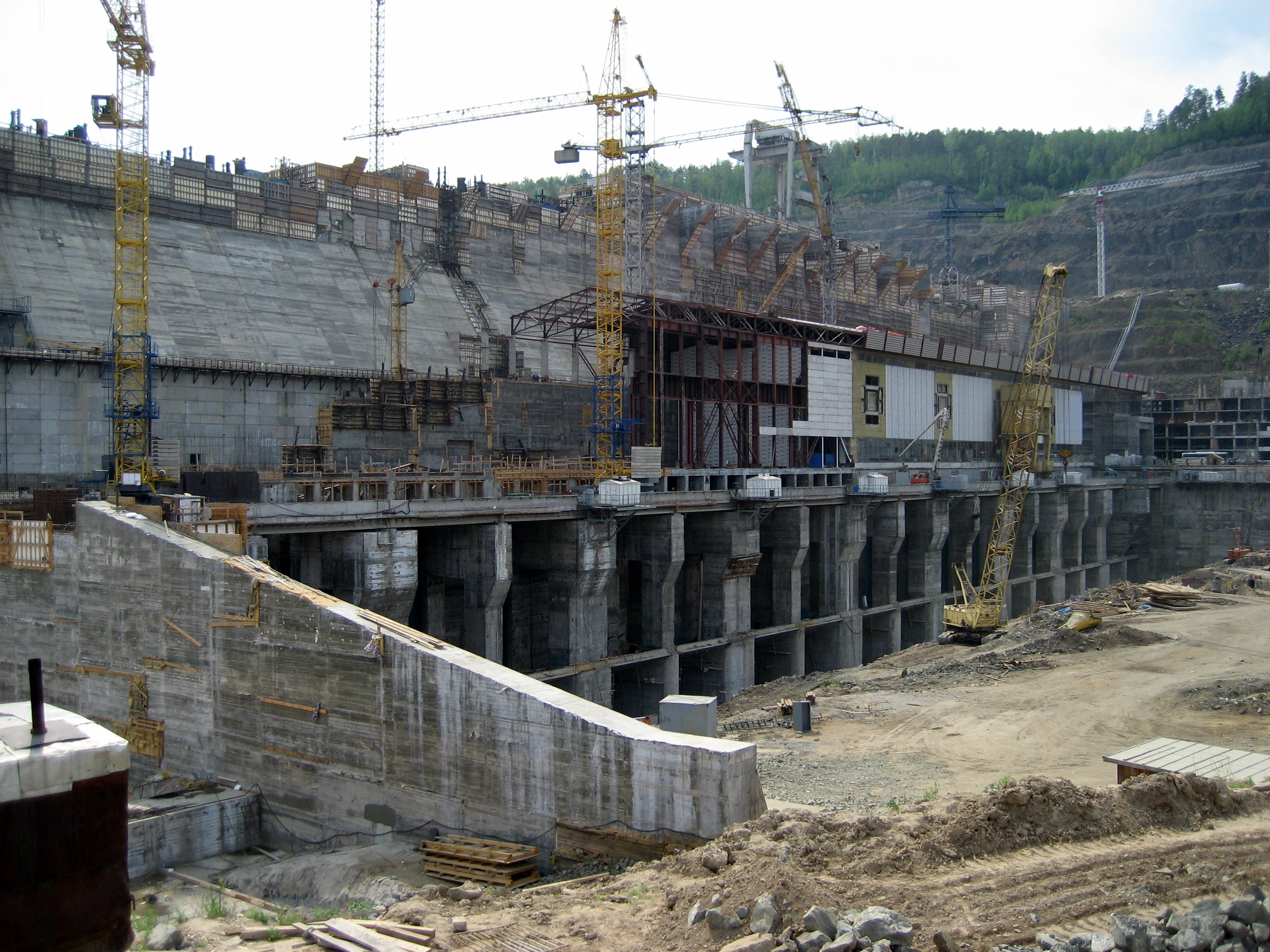
Downstream view of machine hall, May 2011

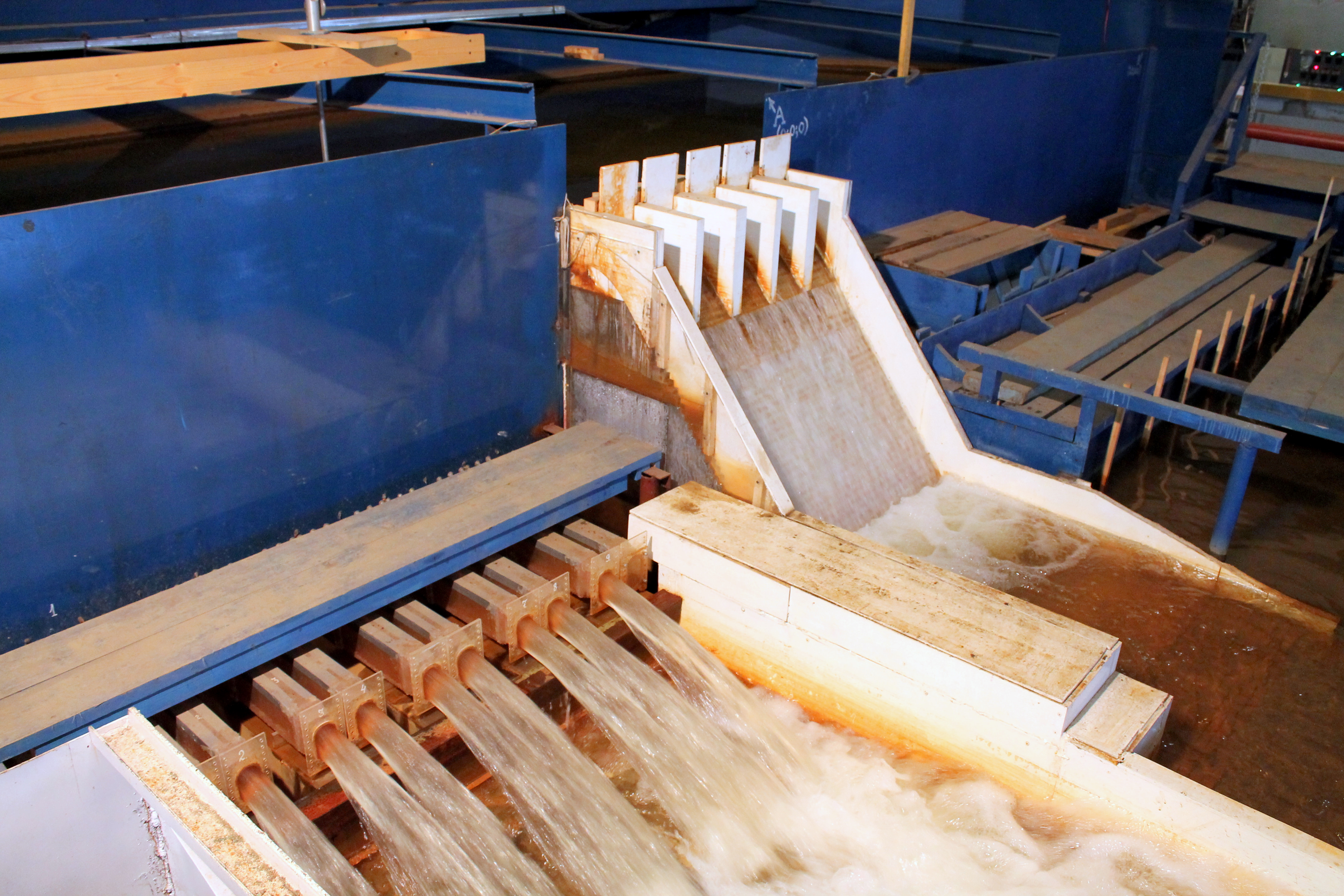
Mockup tests of the dam spillways

== See also ==
- List of power stations in Russia
- Boguchany Aluminium Smelter
