= Kezhemsky District =

Kezhemsky District Кежемский район (Russian)
- District
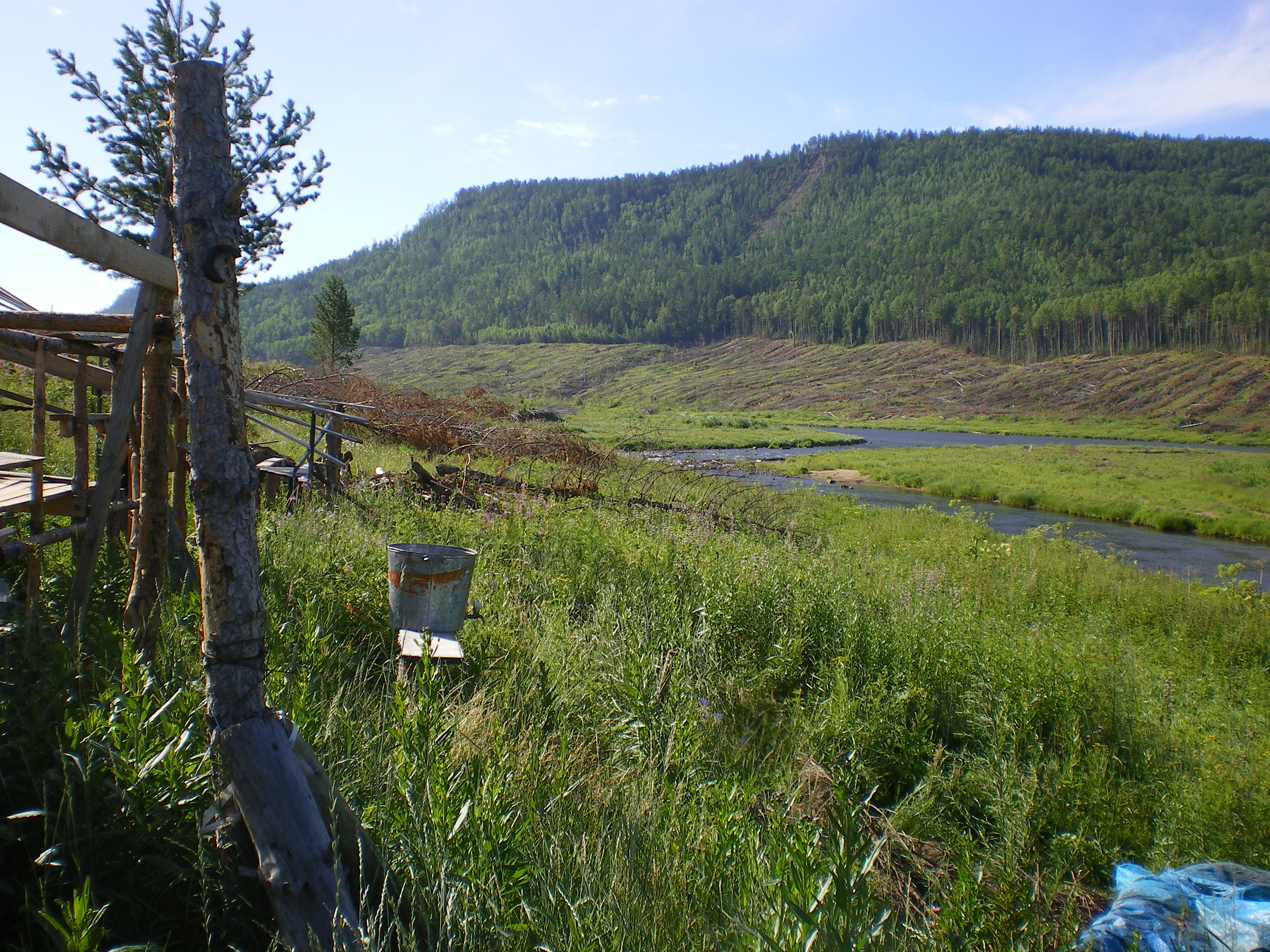
- Kova, Kezhemsky District

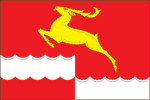
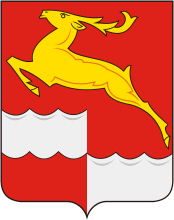
- Flag Coat of arms
- Location of Kezhemsky District in Krasnoyarsk Krai
- Coordinates: 58°41′N 99°11′E
- Country: Russia
- Federal subject: Krasnoyarsk Krai
- Established: July 4, 1928
- Administrative center: Kodinsk

Government
  - Type: Local government
  - Body: Kezhemsky District Council of Deputies
  - Head: Pavel F. Bezmaternykh

Area
  - Total: 34,541 km^{2} (13,336 sq mi)

Population (2010 Census)
  - Total: 22,072
  - Density: 0.63901/km^{2} (1.6550/sq mi)
  - Urban: 67.2%
  - Rural: 32.8%

Administrative structure
  - Administrative divisions: 1 District towns, 7 Selsoviets
  - Inhabited localities: 1 cities/towns, 13 rural localities

Municipal structure
  - Municipally incorporated as: Kezhemsky Municipal District
  - Municipal divisions: 1 urban settlements, 7 rural settlements
- Time zone: UTC+7 (MSK+4)
- OKTMO ID: 04624000
- Website: http://www.kezhemskiy.ru

Kezhemsky District (Russian: Ке́жемский райо́н) is an administrative and municipal district (raion), one of the forty-three in Krasnoyarsk Krai, Russia. It is located in the east of the krai and borders with Evenkiysky District in the north, Irkutsk Oblast in the east and south, and Boguchansky District in the west. The area of the district is 34,541 square kilometers (13,336 sq mi). Its administrative center is the town of Kodinsk. Population: 22,072 (2010 census); 24,997 (2002 census); 31,233 (1989 Soviet census). The population of Kodinsk accounts for 67.2% of the district's total population.

== History ==
The district was founded on July 4, 1928.

== Government ==
As of 2013, the Head of the District and the Chairman of the District Council is Pavel F. Bezmaternykh.
