= List of Game of Thrones episodes =

Game of Thrones is an American fantasy drama television series created by David Benioff and D. B. Weiss. The series is based on George R. R. Martin's series of fantasy novels, A Song of Ice and Fire. The series takes place on the fictional continents of Westeros and Essos, and chronicles the power struggles among noble families as they fight for control of the Iron Throne of the Seven Kingdoms. The series starts when House Stark, led by Lord Eddard "Ned" Stark (Sean Bean), is drawn into schemes surrounding King Robert Baratheon (Mark Addy).

The series premiered on April 17, 2011, on HBO. David Benioff and D. B. Weiss both serve as executive producers, along with Carolyn Strauss, Frank Doelger, Bernadette Caulfield, and George R. R. Martin. Filming for the series took place in a number of locations, including Croatia, Northern Ireland, Iceland, and Spain. Episodes were broadcast on Sunday at 9:00 pm Eastern Time, and the episodes are between 50 and 82 minutes in length. All eight seasons are available on DVD, Blu-ray, and Ultra HD Blu-ray.

The series concluded after its eighth season, which premiered on April 14, 2019, and consisted of six episodes. The show's episodes have won numerous awards including four Primetime Emmy Awards for Outstanding Drama Series. During the course of the series, 73 episodes of Game of Thrones aired over eight seasons, between April 17, 2011, and May 19, 2019.

== Series overview ==
Season	Episodes	Originally released		Avg. U.S. viewers (millions)
Season	Episodes	First released	Last released	Avg. U.S. viewers (millions)
1	10	April 17, 2011	June 19, 2011	2.52
2	10	April 1, 2012	June 3, 2012	3.80
3	10	March 31, 2013	June 9, 2013	4.97
4	10	April 6, 2014	June 15, 2014	6.84
5	10	April 12, 2015	June 14, 2015	6.88
6	10	April 24, 2016	June 26, 2016	7.69
7	7	July 16, 2017	August 27, 2017	10.26
8	6	April 14, 2019	May 19, 2019	11.99

== Episodes ==
=== Season 1 (2011) ===
In Winterfell, Eddard "Ned" Stark becomes Hand of the King to Robert Baratheon, bringing his daughters, Sansa and Arya Stark, with him to King’s Landing. Ned's son Bran is paralyzed after stumbling upon Robert's wife, Queen Cersei Lannister, having sex with her twin brother, Jaime. Ned discovers that Robert and Cersei's three children are in fact Jaime and Cersei's, and are not rightful heirs to the throne. Following Robert's death, however, Cersei's eldest, Joffrey Baratheon, is crowned. Ned's refusal to recognize Joffrey as king leads to his execution; Sansa is held against her will, and Arya escapes by passing as a commoner boy. Meanwhile, Ned's bastard son, Jon Snow, joins the Night's Watch, an ancient order sworn to defend Westeros by maintaining the Wall. In Essos, the exiled Viserys III Targaryen marries off his sister, Daenerys Targaryen, to Dothraki warlord Khal Drogo in exchange for an army to take back Westeros, where his father was once king. Daenerys is gifted three dragon eggs while Viserys is eventually killed by Drogo, who later dies himself. Daenerys then hatches the dragon eggs, bringing dragons back into the world.

No. overall	No. in season	Title	Directed by	Written by	Original release date	U.S. viewers (millions)
1	1	"Winter Is Coming"	Tim Van Patten	David Benioff & D. B. Weiss	April 17, 2011	2.22
2	2	"The Kingsroad"	Tim Van Patten	David Benioff & D. B. Weiss	April 24, 2011	2.20
3	3	"Lord Snow"	Brian Kirk	David Benioff & D. B. Weiss	May 1, 2011	2.44
4	4	"Cripples, Bastards, and Broken Things"	Brian Kirk	Bryan Cogman	May 8, 2011	2.45
5	5	"The Wolf and the Lion"	Brian Kirk	David Benioff & D. B. Weiss	May 15, 2011	2.58
6	6	"A Golden Crown"	Daniel Minahan	Story by : David Benioff & D. B. Weiss; Teleplay by : Jane Espenson and David Benioff & D. B. Weiss	May 22, 2011	2.44
7	7	"You Win or You Die"	Daniel Minahan	David Benioff & D. B. Weiss	May 29, 2011	2.40
8	8	"The Pointy End"	Daniel Minahan	George R. R. Martin	June 5, 2011	2.72
9	9	"Baelor"	Alan Taylor	David Benioff & D. B. Weiss	June 12, 2011	2.66
10	10	"Fire and Blood"	Alan Taylor	David Benioff & D. B. Weiss	June 19, 2011	3.04

=== Season 2 (2012) ===
Ned's eldest son, Robb Stark, takes Jaime prisoner in a recently declared war with the Lannisters. His mother, Catelyn, sends Brienne of Tarth to escort Jaime to King's Landing, where she believes she can trade him for her daughters. In King's Landing, Sansa is frequently abused by Joffrey while acting Hand of the King, and the youngest Lannister child, Tyrion, works with Cersei to prepare for Stannis Baratheon's upcoming attack on the capital. The attack eventually occurs, but despite Stannis's best efforts, he ultimately fails. Having escaped, Arya finds herself trapped in Harrenhal serving as cupbearer to Lannister patriarch, Tywin, but manages to escape. Ned's ward, Theon Greyjoy, betrays Robb and takes Winterfell for himself, forcing Bran and the youngest Stark child, Rickon, to flee to the Wall. Beyond the Wall, Jon is captured and taken to a wildling settlement led by Mance Rayder, while Samwell Tarly encounters White Walkers. In Essos, Daenerys and her khalassar find refuge in Qarth, where her dragons get stolen. She recovers them, steals some wealth, and leaves the city.

No. overall	No. in season	Title	Directed by	Written by	Original release date	U.S. viewers (millions)
11	1	"The North Remembers"	Alan Taylor	David Benioff & D. B. Weiss	April 1, 2012	3.86
12	2	"The Night Lands"	Alan Taylor	David Benioff & D. B. Weiss	April 8, 2012	3.76
13	3	"What Is Dead May Never Die"	Alik Sakharov	Bryan Cogman	April 15, 2012	3.77
14	4	"Garden of Bones"	David Petrarca	Vanessa Taylor	April 22, 2012	3.65
15	5	"The Ghost of Harrenhal"	David Petrarca	David Benioff & D. B. Weiss	April 29, 2012	3.90
16	6	"The Old Gods and the New"	David Nutter	Vanessa Taylor	May 6, 2012	3.88
17	7	"A Man Without Honor"	David Nutter	David Benioff & D. B. Weiss	May 13, 2012	3.69
18	8	"The Prince of Winterfell"	Alan Taylor	David Benioff & D. B. Weiss	May 20, 2012	3.86
19	9	"Blackwater"	Neil Marshall	George R. R. Martin	May 27, 2012	3.38
20	10	"Valar Morghulis"	Alan Taylor	David Benioff & D. B. Weiss	June 3, 2012	4.20

=== Season 3 (2013) ===
After Robb breaks his vow to marry one of Walder Frey's daughters, Frey arranges the massacre of Robb, his mother, his wife, and all his bannermen during a wedding feast. Arya is escorted by the warrior Sandor Clegane to reach Robb, but is too late. After Robb's death, Roose Bolton is appointed the new Warden of the North by Tywin, who is now Hand of the King. Theon is tortured by Roose's bastard son, Ramsay Snow. Further north, Jon Snow earns the trust of the wildlings and climbs the Wall with a wildling party, ending up on its south side, but then betrays them. In the capital, King Joffrey has decided to marry Margaery of House Tyrell, setting Sansa aside. Tywin, however, arranges Sansa's marriage with his son, Tyrion. Brienne and Jaime reach King's Landing, with Jaime having had his dominant hand cut off while defending her. In Essos, Daenerys acquires "The Unsullied", an army of eunuch slave soldiers, as well as former slave and interpreter Missandei. She also joins forces with the "Second Sons", a company of mercenaries, and becomes the Queen of Yunkai.

No. overall	No. in season	Title	Directed by	Written by	Original release date	U.S. viewers (millions)
21	1	"Valar Dohaeris"	Daniel Minahan	David Benioff & D. B. Weiss	March 31, 2013	4.37
22	2	"Dark Wings, Dark Words"	Daniel Minahan	Vanessa Taylor	April 7, 2013	4.27
23	3	"Walk of Punishment"	David Benioff	David Benioff & D. B. Weiss	April 14, 2013	4.72
24	4	"And Now His Watch Is Ended"	Alex Graves	David Benioff & D. B. Weiss	April 21, 2013	4.87
25	5	"Kissed by Fire"	Alex Graves	Bryan Cogman	April 28, 2013	5.35
26	6	"The Climb"	Alik Sakharov	David Benioff & D. B. Weiss	May 5, 2013	5.50
27	7	"The Bear and the Maiden Fair"	Michelle MacLaren	George R. R. Martin	May 12, 2013	4.84
28	8	"Second Sons"	Michelle MacLaren	David Benioff & D. B. Weiss	May 19, 2013	5.13
29	9	"The Rains of Castamere"	David Nutter	David Benioff & D. B. Weiss	June 2, 2013	5.22
30	10	"Mhysa"	David Nutter	David Benioff & D. B. Weiss	June 9, 2013	5.39

=== Season 4 (2014) ===
In King's Landing, Lady Olenna secretly poisons King Joffrey at his wedding with her granddaughter Margaery, but Tyrion is falsely accused of the murder by his family and is found guilty. However, Jaime and Varys conspire to smuggle Tyrion to Essos. Tyrion kills his father Tywin before leaving. Petyr Baelish smuggles Sansa into the Vale, ruled by her aunt and his lover, the widowed Lysa Arryn. Baelish marries Lysa but later kills her. Jaime arms Brienne to assist in her search for the Stark daughters, and she bests Sandor in combat. Arya leaves him for dead and takes a ship bound for Braavos, in Essos. Having returned to the Night's Watch, Jon Snow defends Castle Black against an army of wildlings, who are superior in strength. The Watch is rescued by the arrival of Stannis Baratheon and his forces. A crippled Bran with newfound powers travels north beyond the Wall with a few companions. Beneath a weirwood tree, he finds the Three-eyed Raven, an older man with the ability to perceive the future and the past. In Essos, Daenerys takes control of Meereen and abolishes slavery. When she discovers that her trusted advisor, Ser Jorah Mormont, had spied on her for Robert Baratheon, she exiles him.

No. overall	No. in season	Title	Directed by	Written by	Original release date	U.S. viewers (millions)
31	1	"Two Swords"	D. B. Weiss	David Benioff & D. B. Weiss	April 6, 2014	6.64
32	2	"The Lion and the Rose"	Alex Graves	George R. R. Martin	April 13, 2014	6.31
33	3	"Breaker of Chains"	Alex Graves	David Benioff & D. B. Weiss	April 20, 2014	6.59
34	4	"Oathkeeper"	Michelle MacLaren	Bryan Cogman	April 27, 2014	6.95
35	5	"First of His Name"	Michelle MacLaren	David Benioff & D. B. Weiss	May 4, 2014	7.16
36	6	"The Laws of Gods and Men"	Alik Sakharov	Bryan Cogman	May 11, 2014	6.40
37	7	"Mockingbird"	Alik Sakharov	David Benioff & D. B. Weiss	May 18, 2014	7.20
38	8	"The Mountain and the Viper"	Alex Graves	David Benioff & D. B. Weiss	June 1, 2014	7.17
39	9	"The Watchers on the Wall"	Neil Marshall	David Benioff & D. B. Weiss	June 8, 2014	6.95
40	10	"The Children"	Alex Graves	David Benioff & D. B. Weiss	June 15, 2014	7.09

=== Season 5 (2015) ===
In King's Landing, Margaery marries the new King Tommen Baratheon, Joffrey's younger brother. The Sparrows, a group of religious fanatics, impose their views upon the city, imprisoning Margaery, her brother Loras, and Cersei for committing various sins. Jaime travels to Dorne to take back Myrcella Baratheon. However, Oberyn Martell's lover, Ellaria, and his bastard daughters kill Myrcella as revenge for Oberyn's death. In Winterfell, the new seat of House Bolton, Baelish arranges Sansa's marriage with the now-legitimized son of Roose Bolton, the sadist Ramsay. Stannis's unsuccessful march on Winterfell, which leads to his death, allows Sansa the opportunity to escape with Theon. At the Wall, as the newly elected Lord Commander of the Night's Watch, Jon Snow forms an alliance with the wildlings to save them from the White Walkers and their army of reanimated corpses. However, Jon is stabbed to death by some brothers who see him as a traitor. Arya arrives in Braavos, where she finds Jaqen H'ghar, whom she had previously helped escape, and begins training with the Faceless Men, a guild of assassins. In Essos, Tyrion becomes an advisor to Daenerys. Ser Jorah saves the life of Daenerys against a revolt of slavers, who flees Meereen on Drogon's back.

No. overall	No. in season	Title	Directed by	Written by	Original release date	U.S. viewers (millions)
41	1	"The Wars to Come"	Michael Slovis	David Benioff & D. B. Weiss	April 12, 2015	8.00
42	2	"The House of Black and White"	Michael Slovis	David Benioff & D. B. Weiss	April 19, 2015	6.81
43	3	"High Sparrow"	Mark Mylod	David Benioff & D. B. Weiss	April 26, 2015	6.71
44	4	"Sons of the Harpy"	Mark Mylod	Dave Hill	May 3, 2015	6.82
45	5	"Kill the Boy"	Jeremy Podeswa	Bryan Cogman	May 10, 2015	6.56
46	6	"Unbowed, Unbent, Unbroken"	Jeremy Podeswa	Bryan Cogman	May 17, 2015	6.24
47	7	"The Gift"	Miguel Sapochnik	David Benioff & D. B. Weiss	May 24, 2015	5.40
48	8	"Hardhome"	Miguel Sapochnik	David Benioff & D. B. Weiss	May 31, 2015	7.01
49	9	"The Dance of Dragons"	David Nutter	David Benioff & D. B. Weiss	June 7, 2015	7.14
50	10	"Mother's Mercy"	David Nutter	David Benioff & D. B. Weiss	June 14, 2015	8.11

=== Season 6 (2016) ===
At the Wall, the sorceress Melisandre resurrects Jon. Jon reunites with Sansa and leaves the Night's Watch. Aided by the wildlings, loyalists, and the Knights of the Vale, they defeat the Boltons, and Jon is proclaimed the King in the North. Beyond the Wall, Bran trains with the Three-eyed Raven, but they come under attack by the White Walkers. The Three-eyed Raven is killed and succeeded by Bran, who escapes with the help of his valet Hodor, who dies in the process. Bran realizes Jon is in fact the son of his deceased aunt Lyanna Stark. In Braavos, Arya continues her training with the Faceless Men, but eventually leaves them and returns to Westeros to take revenge on Walder Frey. In King's Landing, Cersei demolishes the Great Sept with wildfire. Many die, including the High Sparrow, Margaery, and Loras. Tommen kills himself after witnessing the events, and Cersei is crowned Queen. In the Iron Islands, Euron Greyjoy usurps leadership by killing his brother and Theon's father, Balon. Daenerys gets captured by the Dothraki but gains their devotion by burning their leaders alive. She forgives Ser Jorah and returns to Meereen, in time to save the city from a naval siege by slavers, then sails for Westeros, joined by Theon and his sister Yara. Ellaria seizes control of Dorne, and joins Olenna Tyrell in an alliance with Daenerys.

No. overall	No. in season	Title	Directed by	Written by	Original release date	U.S. viewers (millions)
51	1	"The Red Woman"	Jeremy Podeswa	David Benioff & D. B. Weiss	April 24, 2016	7.94
52	2	"Home"	Jeremy Podeswa	Dave Hill	May 1, 2016	7.29
53	3	"Oathbreaker"	Daniel Sackheim	David Benioff & D. B. Weiss	May 8, 2016	7.28
54	4	"Book of the Stranger"	Daniel Sackheim	David Benioff & D. B. Weiss	May 15, 2016	7.82
55	5	"The Door"	Jack Bender	David Benioff & D. B. Weiss	May 22, 2016	7.89
56	6	"Blood of My Blood"	Jack Bender	Bryan Cogman	May 29, 2016	6.71
57	7	"The Broken Man"	Mark Mylod	Bryan Cogman	June 5, 2016	7.80
58	8	"No One"	Mark Mylod	David Benioff & D. B. Weiss	June 12, 2016	7.60
59	9	"Battle of the Bastards"	Miguel Sapochnik	David Benioff & D. B. Weiss	June 19, 2016	7.66
60	10	"The Winds of Winter"	Miguel Sapochnik	David Benioff & D. B. Weiss	June 26, 2016	8.89

=== Season 7 (2017) ===
Daenerys arrives in Westeros and takes over Dragonstone. She plans to overthrow Cersei, but Jon arrives to instead convince her to save Westeros from the White Walkers. The two fall in love and venture together beyond the Wall to prove the threat of the White Walkers. The Night King - leader of the White Walkers - kills and reanimates Daenerys' dragon Viserion during the mission. Jon and Daenerys then try to persuade Cersei to join their cause by showing her a wight they captured, but she has her own plans to increase control over the continent. At Winterfell, Sansa is reunited with her siblings, Arya and Bran. When Lord Protector of the Vale Petyr Baelish attempts to turn the Stark children against one another, they manage to turn the tables on him, expose all his crimes, and ultimately have him executed. In a vision, Bran sees that his aunt, Lyanna, was, in fact, married to Prince Rhaegar, and that Jon's real name is Aegon Targaryen, making him Daenerys' nephew and the true heir to the Iron Throne. After his sister Yara is kidnapped by his uncle Euron, Theon sets out to save her. The Night King demolishes a section of The Wall with the help of the reanimated Viserion, allowing the White Walkers and Army of the Dead to pass into the Seven Kingdoms.

No. overall	No. in season	Title	Directed by	Written by	Original release date	U.S. viewers (millions)
61	1	"Dragonstone"	Jeremy Podeswa	David Benioff & D. B. Weiss	July 16, 2017	10.11
62	2	"Stormborn"	Mark Mylod	Bryan Cogman	July 23, 2017	9.27
63	3	"The Queen's Justice"	Mark Mylod	David Benioff & D. B. Weiss	July 30, 2017	9.25
64	4	"The Spoils of War"	Matt Shakman	David Benioff & D. B. Weiss	August 6, 2017	10.17
65	5	"Eastwatch"	Matt Shakman	Dave Hill	August 13, 2017	10.72
66	6	"Beyond the Wall"	Alan Taylor	David Benioff & D. B. Weiss	August 20, 2017	10.24
67	7	"The Dragon and the Wolf"	Jeremy Podeswa	David Benioff & D. B. Weiss	August 27, 2017	12.07

=== Season 8 (2019) ===
Jon and Daenerys travel to Winterfell and learn the Army of the Dead has breached the Wall. Theon rescues Yara, then returns to Winterfell. Sam reveals to Jon that he is actually Aegon Targaryen. Jaime arrives at Winterfell, revealing Cersei will not help defeat the Army of the Dead. Jon reveals his Targaryen lineage to Daenerys, who wants it kept a secret. After a battle, Arya kills the Night King, destroying the Army of the Dead. With the Army of the Dead defeated, Daenerys turns her attention towards the Iron Throne. Euron's navy kills Rhaegal and captures Missandei, who is later executed by Cersei, enraging Daenerys, who, after her army takes King's Landing, destroys much of the city indiscriminately. Jaime kills Euron, while he and Cersei are killed in the destruction. Tyrion denounces Daenerys and is imprisoned for treason, awaiting execution. Jon, unable to stop Daenerys, is forced to kill her. Bran Stark is proclaimed king, allowing the North to secede as an independent kingdom. Bran appoints Tyrion as his Hand. Sansa is crowned Queen in the North, and Arya sails to find new lands. Jon is sentenced to the Night's Watch, and leads the wildlings back north of the Wall.

No. overall	No. in season	Title	Directed by	Written by	Original release date	U.S. viewers (millions)
68	1	"Winterfell"	David Nutter	Dave Hill	April 14, 2019	11.76
69	2	"A Knight of the Seven Kingdoms"	David Nutter	Bryan Cogman	April 21, 2019	10.29
70	3	"The Long Night"	Miguel Sapochnik	David Benioff & D. B. Weiss	April 28, 2019	12.02
71	4	"The Last of the Starks"	David Nutter	David Benioff & D. B. Weiss	May 5, 2019	11.80
72	5	"The Bells"	Miguel Sapochnik	David Benioff & D. B. Weiss	May 12, 2019	12.48
73	6	"The Iron Throne"	David Benioff & D. B. Weiss	David Benioff & D. B. Weiss	May 19, 2019	13.61

== Specials ==
No.	Title	Original release date	U.S. viewers (millions)
1	Game of Thrones: A Day in the Life	February 8, 2015	N/A
A half-hour documentary that covered one day of production of season 5 on three sets in Belfast, Dubrovnik and Osuna from the viewpoint of key crew members.
2	Game of Thrones: The Last Watch	May 26, 2019	1.63
A two-hour documentary which documents the making of season eight.

== Home media release ==
Season	Episodes	DVD and Blu-ray release date		
Season	Episodes	Region 1	Region 2	Region 4
1	10	March 6, 2012	March 5, 2012	August 10, 2012
2	10	February 19, 2013	March 4, 2013	March 6, 2013
3	10	February 18, 2014	February 17, 2014	February 19, 2014
4	10	February 17, 2015	February 16, 2015	February 18, 2015
5	10	March 15, 2016	March 14, 2016	March 16, 2016
6	10	November 15, 2016	November 14, 2016	November 16, 2016
7	7	December 12, 2017	December 11, 2017	December 11, 2017
8	6	December 3, 2019	December 2, 2019	December 4, 2019

== Ratings ==
Game of Thrones : U.S. viewers per episode (millions)

Season	Episode number										Average
Season	1	2	3	4	5	6	7	8	9	10	Average
1	2.22	2.20	2.44	2.45	2.58	2.44	2.40	2.72	2.66	3.04	2.52
2	3.86	3.76	3.77	3.65	3.90	3.88	3.69	3.86	3.38	4.20	3.80
3	4.37	4.27	4.72	4.87	5.35	5.50	4.84	5.13	5.22	5.39	4.97
4	6.64	6.31	6.59	6.95	7.16	6.40	7.20	7.17	6.95	7.09	6.84
5	8.00	6.81	6.71	6.82	6.56	6.24	5.40	7.01	7.14	8.11	6.88
6	7.94	7.29	7.28	7.82	7.89	6.71	7.80	7.60	7.66	8.89	7.69
7	10.11	9.27	9.25	10.17	10.72	10.24	12.07	–			10.26
8	11.76	10.29	12.02	11.80	12.48	13.61	–				11.99

Audience measurement performed by Nielsen Media Research
