= You Win or You Die =

- Game of Thrones episode
- Episode no.: Season 1 Episode 7
- Directed by: Daniel Minahan
- Written by: David Benioff; D. B. Weiss
- Cinematography by: Matthew Jensen
- Editing by: Martin Nicholson
- Original air date: May 29, 2011
- Running time: 57 minutes

Guest appearances
- Donald Sumpter as Maester Luwin; Conleth Hill as Varys; James Cosmo as Ser Jeor Mormont; Owen Teale as Ser Alliser Thorne; Charles Dance as Tywin Lannister; Ian McElhinney as Ser Barristan Selmy; John Bradley as Samwell Tarly; Peter Vaughan as Maester Aemon; Julian Glover as Grand Maester Pycelle; Gethin Anthony as Renly Baratheon; Dominic Carter as Janos Slynt; Natalia Tena as Osha; Esmé Bianco as Ros; Mark Stanley as Grenn; Josef Altin as Pyp; Luke McEwan as Rast; Amrita Acharia as Irri; Roxanne McKee as Doreah; Elyes Gabel as Rakharo; Dar Salim as Qotho; Brian Fortune as Othell Yarwyck; Jason Momoa as Khal Drogo

Episode chronology
← Previous "A Golden Crown"	Next → "The Pointy End"
- Game of Thrones season 1

"You Win or You Die" is the seventh episode of the first season of the HBO medieval fantasy television series Game of Thrones. It was written by series creators David Benioff and D. B. Weiss, and directed by Daniel Minahan. It first aired on May 29, 2011, and was released in advance immediately following the conclusion of "A Golden Crown" to HBO customers with access to HBO Go.

The episode furthers the storyline of deterioration of the political balance of the Seven Kingdoms, with Ned Stark revealing what he has discovered to Cersei Lannister while King Robert Baratheon is still away on a hunt. The title of the episode is part of a quote from Cersei during the final confrontation with Ned: "When you play the game of thrones, you win or you die. There is no middle ground". The catchphrase has been frequently used during the promotion of both the books and the television series.

The episode was generally well received by critics for its well-acted dramatic tension, but with several criticizing the coupling of exposition and nudity as "sexposition". In the United States, the episode achieved a viewership of 2.4 million in its initial broadcast.

This episode marks the first appearance of Charles Dance as Tywin Lannister, as well as the final appearance of Mark Addy as Robert.

== Plot ==
=== In the Westerlands ===
Tywin Lannister gives half his forces to Jaime, his son, to attack Riverrun, the seat of House Tully and Catelyn Stark's childhood home, believing war with the Starks will allow the Lannisters to rule the Seven Kingdoms.

=== At Winterfell ===
Osha, now a servant of Winterfell, reveals that she and her fellow wildlings were fleeing the White Walkers.

=== At the Wall ===
Benjen's horse returns from north of the Wall without him. Samwell Tarly believes Jon Snow, assigned as a steward to the Lord Commander of the Night's Watch instead of as a ranger, is being groomed for command. As Jon and Sam take their vows near a heart tree, Jon's direwolf, Ghost, brings him a severed hand.

=== In Vaes Dothrak ===
Daenerys Targaryen fails to convince her husband, Khal Drogo, to invade her homeland, Westeros. Jorah Mormont receives a royal pardon and realizes Daenerys's assassination has been ordered. He saves her from an attempted poisoning, and Drogo vows to lead his people to reclaim the Iron Throne for his unborn son.

=== In King's Landing ===
Ned Stark confronts Cersei Lannister with the knowledge that Jaime incestuously fathered her children. Cersei defends her affair and reveals Robert was still in love with Lyanna, Ned's sister. Ned tells Cersei to leave the capital with her children before he tells Robert the truth.

Mortally wounded by a boar, Robert dictates his will and testament to Ned, naming him regent until Joffrey comes of age; instead of "Joffrey", Ned writes "my rightful heir". Robert begs Ned to make Joffrey a better man, and tells him to let Daenerys live.

Renly Baratheon tries to convince Ned to launch a coup d'état against the Lannisters, but Ned refuses and dispatches a letter to the rightful heir, Stannis Baratheon, the second of the Baratheon brothers. Ned reveals Joffrey's heritage to Petyr "Littlefinger" Baelish, who suggests that if Joffrey proves an unfit ruler, they use the truth to make Renly king instead. Ned refuses, asking Littlefinger to secure the City Watch's support against Cersei's men-at-arms.

By the time Robert dies, Renly has fled, and Joffrey has ordered his own coronation. Ned and his allies present Robert's will to the court, but Cersei tears it up and orders Ser Barristan Selmy to seize Ned, who orders his men to arrest Cersei and Joffrey. Instead, the City Watch slaughters the Stark men as Littlefinger holds Ned at knifepoint, telling him, "I did warn you not to trust me."

== Production ==
=== Writing ===
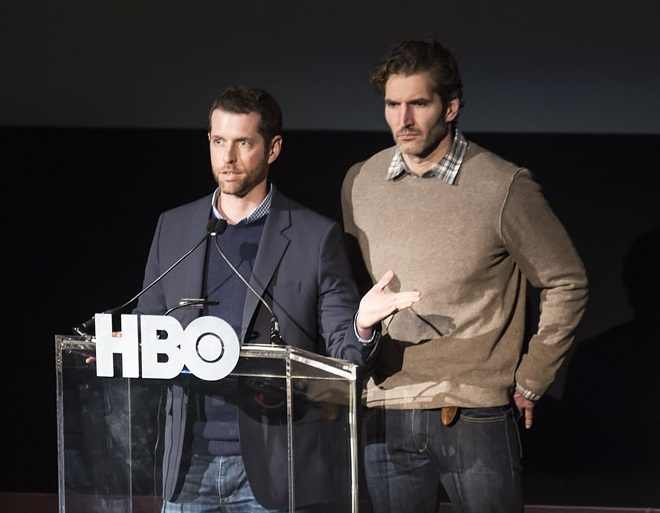
The episode was written by series co-creators David Benioff and D. B. Weiss.

The episode was written by the showrunners David Benioff and D. B. Weiss, based on the original novel by George R. R. Martin. The chapters included in "You Win or You Die" are 46, 48–50, and 55 (Eddard XII, Eddard XIII, Jon VI, Eddard XIV, and Daenerys VI), making it the episode that includes fewest chapters of the source novel in the entire first season. Among the scenes created specifically for the show were a meeting between Tywin and Jaime Lannister (as Lord Tywin is field dressing a stag) and a "training" session between Littlefinger and two new female recruits for one of his brothels.

=== Casting ===
"You Win or You Die" marks the first appearance of Charles Dance as Lord Tywin, the patriarch of the Lannister household. Cast in the role shortly after the production began, Dance had been the first choice of the producers and one of the fan favorites for the role. Author George R. R. Martin commented that "his commanding screen presence and steely charisma should make him the perfect Lord Tywin." The deer that is field dressed by Tywin in the opening scene was a real dead stag. Dance had no previous experience with skinning and gutting, and before filming the scene practiced for an hour with a butcher.

=== Filming locations ===
Most of the episode was shot on set at the Northern Irish studios of The Paint Hall. The exteriors of the entrance of Vaes Dothrak were filmed in the Sandy Brae area, and for the confrontation between Eddard and Cersei taking place in the Red Keep's gardens (identified as a godswood in the novels) the production used the cloister of the St Dominic Monastery in Rabat, in Malta.

== Reception ==
=== Ratings ===
"You Win or You Die"'s first airing was seen by 2.4 million viewers, stabilizing the show's ratings. This could be considered positive when taking into account that the episode had been offered in advance during the preceding week in HBO's online service, and that it was aired in a three-day holiday weekend which often results in lower viewership. With the second airing, the total audience for the night was 3.2 million viewers.

=== Critical response ===
The episode was well received by critics. Review aggregator Rotten Tomatoes surveyed 20 reviews of the episode and judged 100% of them to be positive with an average score of 9.02 out of 10. The website's critical consensus reads, "The cinematic, fast-paced "You Win or You Die" thrusts the plot forward while hinting at painful moments looming for fans." Time's reviewer James Poniewozik called "You Win or You Die" the "most thrilling and thematically rich hour to date," AOL TV's Maureen Ryan found it an excellent outing that "saw the stakes raised in satisfying and suspenseful ways," and HitFix's Alan Sepinwall called it a terrific episode and commended how "it turned the spotlight on the characters who are villains in Ned Stark's version of the story."

"The titular game of thrones (which gets namechecked in the line from Cersei that also provides the individual episode name) has moved past the opening gambit stage now. Major players are falling, alliances are being made and broken, and based on what we know is happening in the north with the White Walkers and to the east with the Dothraki, the game is bound to get a lot bloodier in a damn hurry. These people don't have time to be stressing about who sits on the Iron Throne, not when giant zombies and/or relentless master warriors are on their way."

— Alan Sepinwall, HitFix

Poniewozik continued: "We knew this would be a significant episode if for no other reason than that it contains the scene—alluded to in the episode's title—that gives the series its name," a sentiment Sepinwall agreed with. Myles McNutt, writing for Cultural Learnings, also considered "You Win or You Die" a climactic moment in the series. IGN's Matt Fowler noted that this was the episode that saw Ned Stark "unfortunately thwarted by his own honorable intentions," but that his "stubborn nobility is what makes Ned such a great character."

The final showdown with the Lannisters seizing control from Eddard was much discussed, with many commentators criticizing Ned's ingenuity and his actions during the episode. In The Atlantic, Scott Meslow wrote that Eddard could never win the "game of thrones" because he is dedicated to playing by the rules. In his opinion, "one can't afford to play fair" when the only outcomes are "win" or "die." McNutt felt that the climax at the episode's end "was really well handled by both the cast and the director (Dan Minahan)."

As well as the final confrontation between Eddard and Cersei, other scenes were praised by the critics. The introduction of Charles Dance as Lord Tywin Lannister was considered "a beauty" by Emily VanDerWerff from the A.V. Club, who admired how a single scene depicted not only the relationship between Tywin and Jaime, but also all the dynamics of the Lannister clan. She also praised the work of Nikolaj Coster-Waldau in the scene, commenting that despite having few lines, he transmitted that Jaime is cowed by his father very well. Maureen Ryan agreed with that sentiment, and also lauded Natalia Tena's short appearance. David Sims (a second reviewer for the A.V. Club) highlighted the work of Mark Addy in his final scene, extending the praise to the rest of his work on the series.

Critics agreed that the scenes with the Dothraki were strong, with the storyline having improved significantly since the first episodes. Poniewozik stated that "this was the first week for me that the Dothraki scenes were not just absorbing but felt like the characters were as well-imagined as those in Westeros," and McNutt felt the episode "finally allows Khal Drogo to become an actual character." Drogo's rant vowing to give his unborn son the Iron Throne led to compliments about Jason Momoa's intensity and Emilia Clarke's calm and loving facial expressions.

However, the scene where Littlefinger exposes his motivations while hiring two whores for his brothel was largely criticized as an example of the show's perceived abuse of conversations with prostitutes as an expository device, a situation for which Myles McNutt coined the term "sexposition." Aidan Gillen's acting was consistently praised and the comparison between Littlefinger's actions and faking an orgasm was considered apt, but many agreed with Meslow's statement that it was "annoyingly overshadowed by the series' most gratuitous sex scene to date." Among other criticisms were the scene's excessive length, the repetition of the dramatic approach, and the assumption that viewers were not going to pay attention when presented with a long exposition that did not include sex.
