= Sexposition =

Narrative technique in visual media

The scene that caused a critic to coin the word "sexposition": In Game of Thrones, Petyr Baelish (Aidan Gillen) explains his character's childhood and goals to two actresses who are simulating sexual activity.

In visual media such as television and film, sexposition is the technique of providing exposition against a backdrop of sex or nudity. The Financial Times defined sexposition as "keeping viewers hooked by combining complex plot exposition with explicit sexual goings-on". Its purpose, according to James Poniewozik, is to divert the audience and give characters something to do while exposition is being delivered, which is what distinguishes sexposition from merely gratuitous titillation.

== Etymology ==
The term was coined by blogger/critic Myles McNutt commenting on the HBO TV series Game of Thrones episode "You Win or You Die" in May 2011.

In his post McNutt used the term to describe scenes in which characters reveal plot and character development information during intimate scenes. Author George R. R. Martin said this technique is in line with the purpose of sexuality in the A Song of Ice and Fire books. As the show has to convey details of many characters and backstories from the books, sexposition is useful to deliver the information to viewers in condensed form.

The term has since been retroactively applied to similar practices in earlier works, including the HBO shows Deadwood and The Sopranos (frequently set in strip clubs), many older cop films (likewise), and the comic strip Jane. According to James Poniewozik, the novelty of the practice is not the nudity, but the manner in which it accompanies exposition, for which older TV shows with less complex plots did not have as much need.

== Criticism ==
Some critics have disapproved of sexposition because, in their view, it uses inappropriate tactics, insults the audience's intelligence by appealing and succumbing to carnality and covers up the screenwriter's failure to build cohesive narratives, having to rely on long drawn out sequences of exposition made watchable only through appeals to sexuality. Writing in Salon, Lili Loofbourow criticized sexposition for catering almost exclusively to heterosexual men. Director Neil Marshall recalled during the filming of the second-season Game of Thrones episode "Blackwater" that one of the executive producers repeatedly urged him to add more full-frontal nudity. According to Marshall this executive producer explained to him: "[e]veryone else in the series is drama side. I represent the pervy side of the audience", an experience that Marshall described as "pretty surreal" to happen on the set of a major network production.

Game of Thrones showrunner David Benioff admitted that he does "pay less attention to intricate plot points delivered during sex scenes", and co-creator D. B. Weiss agreed, saying that "Sex grabs people's attention. But once it has their attention, it tends not to let go of it." While the effect is reportedly different for different directors, they say "Every one of those sex scenes is there because we wanted that particular scene in the show. There is not a sex scene quota from HBO." Time reported before the seventh season in 2017 that "Even if Benioff and Weiss don’t always admit it, the show has changed. Scenes in which exposition is delivered in one brothel or another, for example, have been pared back."

Huffington Post critic Maureen Ryan contrasted sexposition—which she said was useful if used to convey much information that would otherwise be boring—with "H.B." ("Hey, boobs!"), which she described as scenes that only exist to show (usually female) nudity, when reviewing the premiere of Starz' Magic City (2012) series.

== Satire ==
Fan site Winter is Coming cited an April 2012 sketch on Saturday Night Live as a satire of sexposition when discussing Marshall's anecdote. Aired before the Marshall interview was published, the skit purported to be an episode of HBO First Look featuring Adam Friedberg, 13-year-old "creative consultant" to Game of Thrones. Played by Andy Samberg, the teenage boy was proud of "mak[ing] sure there are lots of boobs" and various sexual acts during expository scenes. Author Martin (Bobby Moynihan) called Friedberg "a visionary. He knows that even when I didn't write sex into a scene, I was definitely thinking about it". The real Martin is aware of the skit, joking at San Diego Comic-Con that Friedberg could not attend because "[t]here was a scene in Belfast with no boobies in it" which he needed to fix.
