= Game of Thrones: Season 1 (soundtrack) =

Soundtrack album by Ramin Djawadi
- Released: June 14, 2011
- Genre: Soundtrack
- Length: 66:00
- Label: Varèse Sarabande
- Producer: Ramin Djawadi

Ramin Djawadi soundtrack chronology
| Medal of Honor (2010) | Game of Thrones: Season 1 (2011) | Fright Night (2011) |

Singles from Game of Thrones: Season 1
- 1. "Main Title" Released: June 14, 2011

Game of Thrones: Season 1 is the soundtrack album for the first season of HBO series Game of Thrones. Composed by Ramin Djawadi, it was released on June 14, 2011 for digital download and on CD. Djawadi accepted the task 10 weeks before the show premiered, after Stephen Warbeck left the project.

The soundtrack has received neutral to favorable reviews and peaked at number 17 on the US Billboard Soundtrack Albums chart. It was nominated for International Film Music Critics Association for Best Original Score for a Television Series.

== Production and release ==
The soundtrack to Game of Thrones was originally to be composed by Stephen Warbeck. On February 2, 2011, only ten weeks prior to the show's premiere, it was reported that Warbeck had left the project and Ramin Djawadi had been commissioned to write the music instead. The music supervisor of Game of Thrones, Evyen Klean, first suggested Djawadi to showrunners David Benioff and D. B. Weiss as the replacement for Warbeck, and although Djawadi was reluctant as he had other commitments at that time, they managed to persuade him to accept the project.

The producers asked Djawadi to give the series its own distinctive musical identity by avoiding certain musical elements such as flutes or solo vocals previously used successfully by other major fantasy productions. He mentioned that a challenge in scoring the series was its reliance on dialogue and its sprawling cast: on several occasions already-scored music had to be omitted so as not to get in the way of dialogue. Djawadi also evolved the themes with the characters, noting in a 2017 interview that Daenerys's theme "[initially] plays on a couple of instruments on top of the Dothraki music. It's almost like it doesn't have its own identity yet. It sets itself apart during the finale of season 1 when the dragon eggs hatch."

Djawadi said that he was inspired to write the main title music by an early version of the series' computer-animated title sequence. The theme would be repeated all through the series, particularly at important scenes. Many of the recordings were done by solo musicians, while the larger pieces are recorded with a full orchestra and a choir in Prague. The recordings were done with Djawadi communicating with the musicians in Prague over the Internet.

The album was made available for download on iTunes on June 14, 2011, together with a "digital booklet". It was released on CD on June 28, 2011, 41 days after the show's premiere. It was later released as a 2 LP double album, and in 2016 re-released in picture disc format by Newbury Comics.

== Reception ==
Richard Buxton of Tracksounds wrote an ambivalent review, calling the album a "valiant effort" and Djawadi's "most consistently satisfying work to date". The soundtrack also received a score of 4/5 from Heather Phares of AllMusic. Jørn Tillnes, writing for Soundtrack Geek, highlighted the opening theme as "one of the better main themes for any television series out there. It is epic and massive, and that theme is just something you give yourself up to. It's that good and can't be missed." Jonathan Weilbaecher praises the soundtrack as doing "a supreme job mixing emotion with epic, a trick that even the very best have a hard time with."

== Track listing ==
| No. | Title | Key scenes/Notes | Length |
|---|---|---|---|
| 1. | "Main Title" | Used in the opening sequence | 1:46 |
| 2. | "North of the Wall" | "Winter Is Coming": When the three men of the Night's Watch encounter the White Walkers north of the Wall. "The Pointy End": During the burning of the wights. | 3:48 |
| 3. | "Goodbye Brother" | House Stark's theme. "The Kingsroad": Jon Snow says goodbye to an unconscious Bran and Ned farewells Catelyn and Bran. "Baelor": Heard during the end credits after the trial of Eddard Stark outside the sept of Baelor. "Mother's Mercy": Jon Snow's death. | 3:07 |
| 4. | "The Kingsroad" | "The Kingsroad": Ned farewells Jon Snow as he rides to join the Night's Watch. "Lord Snow": As Ned, Arya, Sansa and the royal court arrive to King's Landing. "Baelor": Robb and his men return with a captive Jaime Lannister. | 2:06 |
| 5. | "The King's Arrival" | House Baratheon's theme. "Winter Is Coming": Robert Baratheon and the royal court arrive to Winterfell. A shorter version is used on the main menu of season 1's DVD/Blu-ray release. | 3:34 |
| 6. | "Love in the Eyes" | Daenerys Targaryen's theme. "Winter Is Coming": Daenerys Targaryen and Khal Drogo's first night after their wedding. "The Kingsroad": As Doreah teaches Daenerys how to sexually please Khal Drogo. | 4:00 |
| 7. | "A Raven from King's Landing" | "Winter Is Coming": Catelyn tells Ned about Jon Arryn's death. "Cripples, Bastards, and Broken Things", "A Golden Crown" and "Fire and Blood": During Bran's dream of the three-eyed raven. | 1:16 |
| 8. | "The Wall" | The Night's Watch theme. "Lord Snow": As Jon goes to the top of the Wall. "You Win or You Die": When the Night's Watch recruits are given their assignments and Jon is sent to the stewards. "Fire and Blood": Grenn, Pyp and Sam recite the oath of the Night's Watch to bring Jon back. | 1:59 |
| 9. | "Things I Do for Love" | "Winter Is Coming": Just before Jaime Lannister pushes Bran from the window. | 1:52 |
| 10. | "A Golden Crown" | Viserys Targaryen's theme. "Winter Is Coming": The first scene of Daenerys and Viserys Targaryen at Illyrio Mopatis's house. "Cripples, Bastards, and Broken Things": As Viserys and Doreah talk about dragons. | 1:38 |
| 11. | "Winter Is Coming" | "The Kingsroad": Ned kills Lady and Bran awakens. | 2:42 |
| 12. | "A Bird Without Feathers" | "The Kingsroad": Cersei tells Catelyn about her first son, who died at childbirth. | 2:02 |
| 13. | "Await the King's Justice" | "Cripples, Bastards, and Broken Things": Catelyn arrests Tyrion Lannister for conspiring to murder Bran. | 2:00 |
| 14. | "You'll Be Queen One Day" | "A Golden Crown": Joffrey asks for Sansa's forgiveness, gives her a necklace and they kiss. | 1:36 |
| 15. | "The Assassin's Dagger" | "The Kingsroad": Catelyn fights against the assassin sent for Bran. | 1:19 |
| 16. | "To Vaes Dothrak" | The Dothraki theme. "The Kingsroad": As Khal Drogo's khalasar rides towards Vaes Dothrak. "Cripples, Bastards, and Broken Things": As Drogo's khalasar enter Vaes Dothrak. It also features the Daenerys Targaryen's theme ("Love in the Eyes"). | 1:29 |
| 17. | "Jon's Honor" | "Fire and Blood": Jon attempts to escape the Night's Watch. | 2:35 |
| 18. | "Black of Hair" | "A Golden Crown": Ned deduces that Joffrey Baratheon is not Robert's son. It contains hints of the honor theme, which would appear in full in the season 2 track "The Old Gods and the New". | 1:40 |
| 19. | "You Win or You Die" | Joffrey Baratheon's theme. "You Win or You Die": Joffrey proclaims himself king. "The Pointy End": Joffrey tells Sansa that Ned must confess to treason or there will be no mercy for him. "Fire and Blood": After Ned Stark has been decapitated. "Second Sons": Joffrey talks to Sansa during her wedding feast about consummating her marriage with Tyrion. | 1:57 |
| 20. | "Small Pack of Wolves" | "The Wolf and the Lion": During Jaime Lannister and Ned Stark's fight. | 1:57 |
| 21. | "Game of Thrones" | A variation of the main theme. Used in the credits in many episodes. | 1:18 |
| 22. | "Kill Them All " | "Fire and Blood": Maester Luwin receives news of Ned's death, Catelyn mourns over Ned, and she comforts Robb. | 2:35 |
| 23. | "The Pointy End" | "Lord Snow": During Arya's first lesson with her "dancing master", Syrio Forel. Contains hints of Arya Stark's theme, which would appear in full in the season 2 track "Valar Morghulis". | 3:16 |
| 24. | "Victory Does Not Make Us Conquerors" | "Baelor": Robb tells his troops that the war is far from over. | 1:35 |
| 25. | "When the Sun Rises in the West" | "Fire and Blood": Daenerys smothers the catatonic Drogo. It contains the melody of Daenerys' theme ("Love in the Eyes"). | 2:40 |
| 26. | "King of the North" | "Fire and Blood": Robb Stark is proclaimed King in the North by the high lords of the North. It contains hints of House Stark theme ("Goodbye Brother"). | 1:28 |
| 27. | "The Night's Watch" | "Fire and Blood": Lord Commander Mormont tells Jon Snow that he intends to march North of the Wall, and the subsequent marching. | 1:44 |
| 28. | "Fire and Blood" | House Targaryen and Dragons' theme. "Fire and Blood": The funeral pyre of Khal Drogo, Mirri Maz Duur is burnt in it and Daenerys walks into the flames. It also contains pieces of the melody of Daenerys' theme ("Love in the Eyes"). | 4:30 |
| 29. | "Finale" | "Fire and Blood": Daenerys appears alive and unharmed by the flames with the three dragons which have hatched from the dragon's eggs in Drogo's pyre. It contains the melody of Daenerys' theme ("Love in the Eyes") and the main theme. | 2:31 |
| Total length: | | | 66:00 |

== Credits and personnel ==
Personnel adapted from the album liner notes.

- David Benioff – liner notes
- Brandon Campbell – technical score advisor
- Ramin Djawadi – composer, primary artist, producer
- Patricia Sullivan Fourstar – mastering
- Evyen J. Klean – music supervisor
- Dave Klotz – music editor
- Robin Quinn – music editor
- Bobby Tahouri – additional music
- Robert Townson – executive producer
- D.B. Weiss – liner notes

== Charts ==
| Chart (2011) | Peak position |
|---|---|
| Belgian Albums (Ultratop Flanders) | 157 |
| US Soundtrack Albums (Billboard) | 17 |

== Awards and nominations ==
| Year ago | Award | Category | Result | Ref. |
|---|---|---|---|---|
| 2011 | International Film Music Critics Association | Best Original Score for a Television Series | Nominated | |
