= Lord Snow =

- Game of Thrones episode
- Episode no.: Season 1 Episode 3
- Directed by: Brian Kirk
- Written by: David Benioff; D. B. Weiss
- Cinematography by: Marco Pontecorvo
- Editing by: Frances Parker
- Original air date: May 1, 2011
- Running time: 57 minutes

Guest appearances
- Conleth Hill as Varys; James Cosmo as Jeor Mormont; Owen Teale as Alliser Thorne; Jamie Sives as Jory Cassel; Ian McElhinney as Barristan Selmy; Ron Donachie as Rodrik Cassel; Joseph Mawle as Benjen Stark; Francis Magee as Yoren; Julian Glover as Grand Maester Pycelle; Gethin Anthony as Renly Baratheon; Peter Vaughan as Maester Aemon; Miltos Yerolemou as Syrio Forel; Margaret John as Old Nan; Susan Brown as Septa Mordane; Mark Stanley as Grenn; Josef Altin as Pyp; Luke McEwan as Rast; Elyes Gabel as Rakharo; Amrita Acharia as Irri; Eugene Simon as Lancel Lannister; Jason Momoa as Khal Drogo

Episode chronology
← Previous "The Kingsroad"	Next → "Cripples, Bastards, and Broken Things"
- Game of Thrones season 1

"Lord Snow" is the third episode of the first season of the HBO medieval fantasy television series Game of Thrones. It first aired on May 1, 2011. It was written by series creators David Benioff and D. B. Weiss, and directed by series regular Brian Kirk, his directorial debut for the series.

The plot follows Jon Snow's training at the Wall; Ned Stark's arrival at King's Landing, followed by Catelyn, looking for Bran's would-be murderer; Arya reveals her desire to learn sword fighting to Ned; Joffrey Baratheon is given a lesson in ruling the Kingdom by Cersei Lannister; and Robert longs for the glory of his past. Meanwhile, Daenerys Targaryen learns she is pregnant. The episode was the first to feature Old Nan, played by Margaret John, who died before the series was broadcast; the episode is dedicated to her memory in the final credits.

The title of the episode is the demeaning nickname given to Jon by Ser Alliser Thorne, the sadistic trainer of Night's Watch recruits, referring to his highborn origins.

Critical reception was generally positive, with critics praising the series' further character development, the introduction of the Small Council, and the performances, with Maisie Williams singled out for her portrayal of Arya, while her sword lesson scenes also received positive notice. In the United States, the episode achieved a viewership of 2.4 million in its initial broadcast.

== Plot ==
=== In the Dothraki Sea ===
Daenerys Targaryen gains confidence and earns the respect of her bodyguard, Ser Jorah Mormont. After assaulting her, Viserys, her brother, is nearly killed by one of Daenerys's bloodriders. Irri, one of Daenerys's Dothraki maids, notices that Daenerys is pregnant; Jorah, upon being told, departs for Qohor for supplies. Later, Daenerys reveals to Khal Drogo that their child is a boy.

=== At the Wall ===
Jon Snow easily beats his fellow recruits in combat. Night's Watch master-at-arms Ser Allister Thorne berates them all for their poor performance—even Jon, nicknaming him "Lord Snow" to mock his bastardy. Jon asks Benjen to take him north of the Wall, but he tells Jon that he must earn the right.

Jon makes amends by giving his fellow recruits proper sword training. Tyrion Lannister is asked to request more men from Queen Cersei and Jaime Lannister, his siblings, for the understaffed Night's Watch to guard against the threat of the White Walkers in the North. Although skeptical, Tyrion agrees to do so; he departs the Wall and says goodbye to Jon, who accepts Tyrion as a friend.

=== At Winterfell ===
With Bran now awake, Robb, his eldest brother, tells him that he will never walk again. Bran, saying he is unable to remember anything about his fall, wishes he were dead.

=== In King's Landing ===
Eddard "Ned" Stark and his daughters arrive in King's Landing. On his way to a meeting of the king's Small Council, Ned encounters Jaime. It is revealed that Jaime killed the "Mad King" Aerys II Targaryen, the father of Daenerys and Viserys. Ned remains dissatisfied that Jaime broke his oath as a knight of the Kingsguard.

Ned joins the king's Small Council, consisting of King Robert Baratheon's brother Lord Renly, Lord Varys, Grand Maester Pycelle, and Lord Petyr "Littlefinger" Baelish. Renly announces Robert's plans for a great tourney in honor of Ned's appointment as Hand of the King. Ned learns that the Crown is heavily indebted.

Upon arriving in King's Landing, Catelyn is taken to a brothel owned by Littlefinger, who, along with Varys and Ser Rodrik Cassell, discusses the attempt on Bran's life. Littlefinger admits that the assassin's dagger was once his, but he lost it to Tyrion. Ned agrees to ally with Littlefinger to find out who is responsible for Bran's attempted murder.

Ned returns to his keep to find his daughters, Sansa and Arya, arguing, with Arya angry at Sansa for lying for Prince Joffrey Baratheon. Ned reminds her that Sansa and Joffrey will be married one day. Learning that Arya aspires to be a swordswoman and has a sword of her own, Ned hires Syrio Forel to teach her the art of swordsmanship.

== Production ==
=== Writing ===
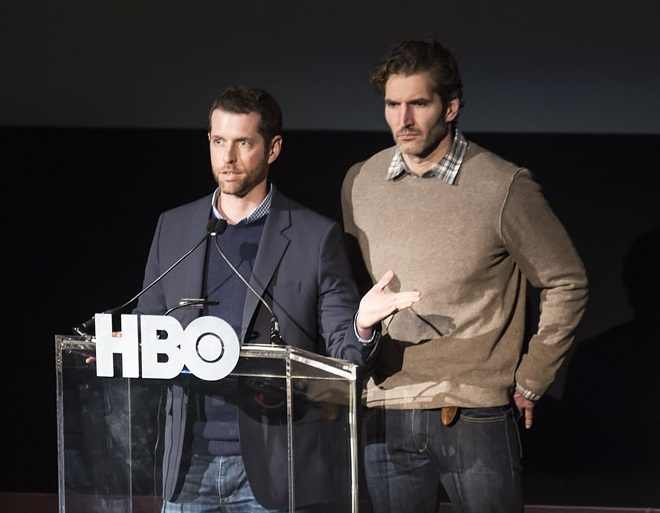
The episode was written by series co-creators David Benioff and D. B. Weiss.

"Lord Snow" was written by the show creators and executive producers David Benioff and D. B. Weiss, based on A Game of Thrones by George R. R. Martin, including chapters 18-22, 24 and 36. (Catelyn IV, Jon III, Eddard IV, Tyrion III, Arya II, Bran IV and Daenerys IV).

=== Casting ===
The third episode introduces a number of new characters as the story expands to the new locales of King's Landing and the Wall.

In the capital city the members of the council are presented. Series regular Aidan Gillen, known for his roles in Queer as Folk and The Wire takes the role of Lord Petyr Baelish, the king's master of coin known as "Littlefinger." Gethin Anthony plays the king's youngest brother Renly Baratheon, and veteran actor Julian Glover, well known to science fiction and fantasy fans after appearing in films such as The Empire Strikes Back and Indiana Jones and the Last Crusade, was cast as Grand Maester Pycelle after actor Roy Dotrice had to be replaced for medical reasons. Author George R. R. Martin wrote on the casting of Conleth Hill as spymaster Varys: "Hill, like Varys, is quite a chameleon, an actor who truly disappears inside the characters he portrays, more than capable not only of bringing the slimy, simpering eunuch to life." Ian McElhinney plays Ser Barristan Selmy, the commander of the Kingsguard, and Miltos Yorelemou appears as the fencing instructor Syrio Forel. McElhinney had previously played Gillen's father in Queer as Folk.

The hierarchy of the Wall is introduced with James Cosmo as Commander Jeor Mormont, Peter Vaughan as the blind maester Aemon, Owen Teale as the trainer of the new recruits Ser Alliser Thorne, and Francis Magee as the recruiter Yoren.

"We were deeply saddened to hear about Margaret's passing. She was a warm and wonderful person, and she was completely fantastic in her scenes with Isaac. We wish she could see them… but many people will, and they will love her. We will miss her terribly."

— David Benioff and Dan Weiss

This episode also marks the first appearance of the Welsh actress Margaret John as Old Nan. 84-year-old Margaret John died on 2 February 2011, a few months after having finished recording her scenes in Game of Thrones, which was her last role on television. Executive producers David Benioff and Dan Weiss issued a statement grieving her death. The episode "Lord Snow" is dedicated to her, with the last credit being "In the memory of Margaret John."

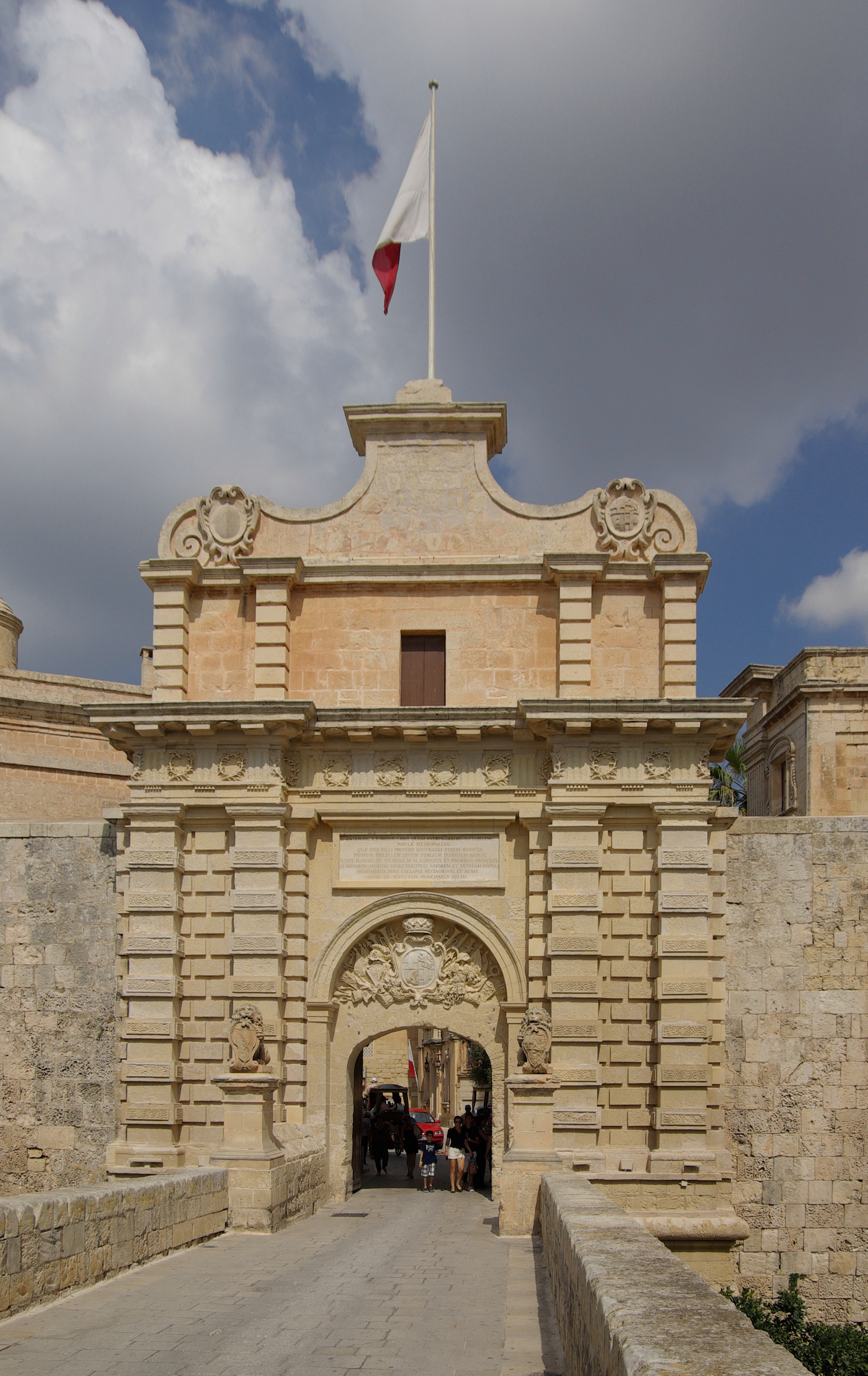
The Mdina Gate doubles as the gate of the Red Keep.

=== Filming locations ===
To film the scenes at the Wall, the production built a set on the abandoned quarry of Magheramorne, a few minutes north of Belfast. The composite set (with both exteriors and interiors) consisted of a large section of Castle Black, including the courtyard, the ravenry, the mess hall, and the barracks, and used the quarry's stone wall as the basis for the ice wall that protects Westeros from the dangers beyond. They also made a real elevator to lift the rangers to the top of the Wall.

For the streets of King's Landing, the production flew to Malta. The gate of Fort Ricasoli also served as the King's Gate, as shown at the beginning of the episode when the royal entourage enters the city. The entrance of the Red Keep used when Catelyn and Rodrik enter the fortification corresponds to Mdina Gate, and also in Mdina the Pjazza Mesquita is the location for the entrance to the brothel owned by Lord Baelish.

Ron Donachie, the actor playing Ser Rodrik Cassel, said that the scene where he entered King's Landing was his favourite moment. Visiting a museum in the Maltese capital of Valletta, Donachie had seen a painting of armed knights riding through that Gate of Mdina itself and found exciting that to be able to do the same thing, "especially in Rodrik’s full-scale Stark battle regalia".

=== Other ===
On the scene where Old Nan offers to tell Bran stories, she claims that his favorites are the ones about Ser Duncan the Tall. The tales of Duncan and his squire Egg are a series of novellas written by author George R. R. Martin, taking place about a hundred years before the events of Game of Thrones.

== Reception ==
=== Ratings ===
"Lord Snow"'s first airing was seen by 2.4 million viewers, which represented a 10% increase in the ratings from the two previous episodes. Combined with the second airing it reached 3.1 million viewers, which were considered good results especially considering that the news of Osama Bin Laden's death broke during the West Coast airing of the episode.

In the UK, the viewership figures were in line with those obtained on the previous week, with around 510,000 viewers. Those figures are in the top end for the network, Sky Atlantic.

=== Critical response ===
While the majority of the critics gave "Lord Snow" a positive review, many suggested that it suffered from having to introduce many new characters and locations. Review aggregator Rotten Tomatoes surveyed 14 reviews of the episode and judged 86% of them to be positive with an average score of 8.75 out of 10. The website's critical consensus reads, "'Lord Snow' is an intriguing and heavy transitional episode with standout performances from Bean and Gillen, though it would be better served with more focus on character change and development." Myles McNutt wrote at Cultural Learnings that it was "perhaps the most narratively uninteresting episode of the first six," although he highlighted that it was "hardly a bad episode of television, filled as it is with satisfying sequences that capture many themes key to the series," and added that many issues introduced in this episode had a payoff in future installments. Entertainment Weekly's James Hibberd also thought that it was his least favorite episode of the first six, due to too much character development. However, Alan Sepinwall from HitFix, liked the "more rambling quality of 'Lord Snow,'" and while admitting it is heavy on exposition he felt it worked "because the stories are being told with such passion." IGN's Matt Fowler wrote that "Lord Snow" was "dense and filled with tons of exposition and backstory, which may or may not have interested those new to this story - but I found myself hanging on every precious word." Alan Sepinwall wrote a positive review of the episode for HitFix, saying "Arya's fencing lesson is a wonderful scene, carried by the joy of Maisie Williams' performance and the playful, Inigo Montoya-ish quality of her new teacher Syrio, but it's also such a small, simple thing that you wouldn't ordinarily expect it to be the note that an episode of dramatic television goes out on" and continued "I liked the looser, more rambling quality of "Lord Snow," an episode largely about transitions, fish out of water, and old ghosts.

Some of the scenes were highly praised by reviewers. The closing scene with Arya taking her first lesson from the Braavosi Syrio Forel was highlighted. Maureen Ryan from AOL TV stated that it was her favorite scene of the series so far, and James Hibberd remarked upon the quality of all the child actors of the show and stated that Maisie Williams owned her role in this episode. Other scenes that were noted by the critics were the father-daughter dialogue with Eddard Stark and Arya, King Robert remembering with the members of his Kingsguard their first killings, and Eddard attending his first session of the Small Council.
