= The Kingsroad =

- Game of Thrones episode
- Episode no.: Season 1 Episode 2
- Directed by: Tim Van Patten
- Written by: David Benioff; D. B. Weiss
- Cinematography by: Alik Sakharov
- Editing by: Oral Norrie Ottey
- Original air date: April 24, 2011
- Running time: 55 minutes

Guest appearances
- Donald Sumpter as Maester Luwin; Jamie Sives as Jory Cassel; Ron Donachie as Rodrik Cassel; Joseph Mawle as Benjen Stark; Roxanne McKee as Doreah; Dar Salim as Qotho; Amrita Acharia as Irri; Sarita Piotrowski as Jhiqui; Wilko Johnson as Ilyn Payne; Rhodri Hosking as Mycah; Luke McEwan as Rast; Lalor Roddy as the Assassin; Callum Wharry as Tommen Baratheon; Aimee Richardson as Myrcella Baratheon; Jason Momoa as Khal Drogo

Episode chronology
← Previous "Winter Is Coming"	Next → "Lord Snow"
- Game of Thrones season 1

"The Kingsroad" is the second episode of the first season of the HBO medieval fantasy television series Game of Thrones, first aired on April 24, 2011. It was written by series creators David Benioff and D. B. Weiss, and directed by Tim Van Patten.

Nearly all the action of the episode happens during travel: Ned Stark and his daughters accompany the King Robert Baratheon's entourage to King's Landing to occupy the post of Hand of the King, Tyrion Lannister joins Jon Snow in his travel to the Wall, and the newly wed Daenerys Targaryen goes with her husband's khalasar to the city of Vaes Dothrak. Meanwhile, in Winterfell, a grieving Catelyn Stark watches over her unconscious son Bran.

The episode title refers to the long road that snakes through Westeros, eventually ending at King's Landing.

Viewership was unchanged from the premiere, despite the second episode airing on Easter Sunday. Critical reception was largely favorable, with praise for the character development, though some considered it inferior to the previous episode. Filming took place at several notable Northern Ireland locations, and the production was complicated by the difficulty of integrating canine actors into several crucial scenes. In the United States, the episode achieved a viewership of 2.2 million in its initial broadcast.

== Plot ==
=== In the Dothraki Sea ===
En route to Vaes Dothrak with Khal Drogo's khalasar, Jorah Mormont reveals to Viserys III Targaryen that he was exiled for selling poachers into slavery. Viserys is impatient for control of Drogo's army. Daenerys Targaryen, Viserys's sister, struggles with her new marriage and the nomadic Dothraki lifestyle, taking comfort in her dragon eggs. Distressed by sex with the Khal, she asks her handmaiden Doreah how to please her husband. Later, she is able to have sex with Drogo while facing him, leading the relationship to become more intimate.

=== At Winterfell ===
Bran Stark has been in a coma for over a month. After slapping Joffrey Baratheon for refusing to give his condolences to the Starks, Tyrion, his uncle, informs his siblings that Bran will survive.

Eddard "Ned" Stark and his daughters prepare to journey to the capital with King Robert Baratheon, while Jon leaves to join his uncle Benjen Stark as a man of the Night's Watch, accompanied by Tyrion. Jon gives Arya, his youngest sister, a sword, which she names "Needle". Catelyn chastises Ned for leaving her. Ned promises Jon to tell him about his mother when they meet again. As they embark for King's Landing, Robert tells Ned of Daenerys's marriage to Drogo and the possibility of Viserys raising a Dothraki army to overthrow him.

A fire breaks out at Winterfell as an assassin tries to kill Bran, but the assassin is held off by Catelyn and killed by Bran's direwolf. A strand of blonde hair in the tower where Bran fell convinces Catelyn that the Lannisters are involved. Confiding in her eldest son, Robb, Maester Luwin, Master-at-Arms Ser Rodrik Cassel, and Theon, Catelyn decides to go to King's Landing to warn Ned.

=== At the Wall ===
Reaching the Wall, Tyrion disabuses Jon of his romantic notions of the once-noble Night's Watch, which is now a place for criminals, prisoners, and bastards.

=== At the Inn at the Crossroads ===
The king's entourage stops at an inn, where Joffrey's cruelty to Arya's commoner friend Mycah results in Joffrey being bitten by Arya's direwolf Nymeria, whom he accuses of attacking him. Sansa, newly betrothed to Joffrey, claims to remember nothing, and King Robert gives in to Queen Cersei Lannister's demand that the direwolf be killed. With Nymeria having fled, Sansa's direwolf Lady is to be killed instead, for which Ned takes responsibility. He encounters Joffrey's bodyguard, Sandor "the Hound" Clegane, who has killed Mycah for the prince. Reluctantly, Ned kills Lady, while in the North, Bran suddenly awakens from his coma.

== Production ==
=== Writing ===
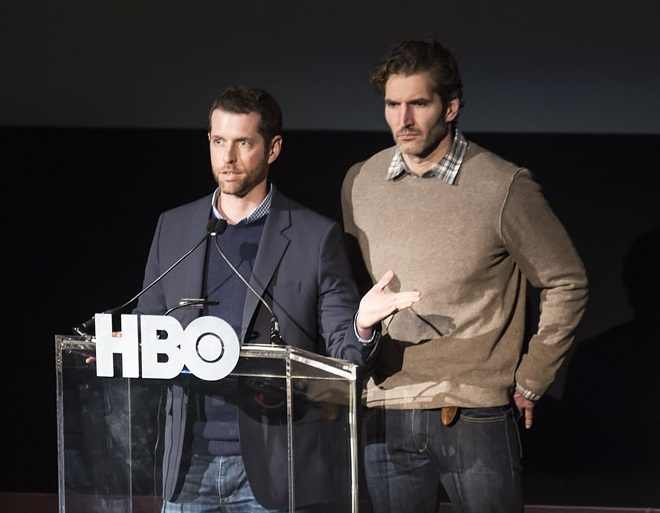
The episode was written by series co-creators David Benioff and D. B. Weiss.

The second episode was written by the show creators and executive producers David Benioff and D. B. Weiss, based on the original book by George R. R. Martin."The Kingsroad" includes chapters 10-11, 13-18 and 24. (Tyrion I, Jon II, Eddard II, Tyrion II, Catelyn III, Sansa I, Eddard III, Bran III, Daenerys III.)

While the events in this episode mostly follow the book, differences in the screen adaptation include not introducing the council's delegation with Ser Barristan and Lord Renly and the conversation between Robert and Eddard taking place during breakfast instead of on horseback. Some scenes were also created for the series, most notably a conversation between Catelyn and Cersei at Bran's bedside remembering the Queen's first child by Robert that died early of sickness (in the novel, when Ned confronts Cersei about Jaime fathering her children, she hinted that her first pregnancy, which was by Robert, she had aborted), and a confrontation between Jaime and Jon before Jon leaves for the Wall.

=== Casting ===
This episode marks the first appearance of regular guest star Roxanne McKee, best known for her role of Louise Summers in the British Channel 4 soap opera Hollyoaks. McKee was chosen among a great number of candidates to play the part of Doreah, a slave serving as Daenerys Targaryen's handmaiden.

Also introduced in this episode is British musician Wilko Johnson as the executioner Ilyn Payne. The mute headsman of Game of Thrones is Johnson's first acting job.

=== Filming locations ===
The principal shooting for the episode was done at The Paint Hall studio. The scenes at the Inn at the Crossroads were filmed on location at the Redhall Estate, in Ballycarry, during the first days of September 2010.

=== Direwolves ===
"The Kingsroad" has a significant number of scenes that include direwolves. To stand in for the extinct species, the production team considered using real wolves, but the UK safety laws and close work with child actors made this impractical. Instead, they chose to use Northern Inuit Dogs due to their resemblance to wolves.

The dog that portrayed Lady, Zanni, was adopted after the season wrapped by the family of Sophie Turner, the actress playing the direwolf's owner, Sansa Stark.

== Reception ==
=== Ratings ===
The second episode of Game of Thrones attracted the same viewing figures as the premiere, with 2.2 million viewers. The second repeat obtained 0.7 million, which was also similar to the previous week's figure. These ratings have been considered positive, especially considering that it was aired on an Easter Sunday.

=== Critical response ===
Critical reaction was favorable, although some critics felt it was inferior to the first episode. Review aggregator Rotten Tomatoes surveyed 17 reviews of the episode and judged 100% of them to be positive with an average score of 7.3 out of 10. The website's critical consensus reads, "'The Kingsroad' brings surprising new developments for characters undergoing change while pushing the various plots forward at an effective pace." Entertainment Weekly's James Hibberd considered the second episode better than the first one, while TV Squad's Maureen Ryan gave "The Kingsroad" the lowest score from the first six episodes of the series. Matt Fowler, who reviewed the episode for IGN, gave it a score of 8/10, and maintained that it was still a solid effort that focused on shifting all the main characters out of their comfort zones. Emily St. James, from The A.V. Club, gave the episode a B, saying "it was a small step up from the pilot...and is a particularly eventful hour of Game Of Thrones, layering on plot point after plot point in a brisk, fairly economical matter."

Alan Sepinwall from HitFix, has described "The Kingsroad" as a transition episode and therefore "not as likely to excite as the premiere or some of the season's later episodes." Maureen Ryan felt that the show lacked a thematic unity, and while it had some effective moments, in some ways "lacked emotional spark." At Cultural Learnings, Myles McNutt admitted that having to move all pieces into place made the episode resemble a travelogue, but he considered the lack of cohesion to be very purposeful since it helped to emphasize the splitting of the Stark family and the different motivations and destinies that awaited the protagonists.
