= Clash of the Titans (soundtrack) =

Clash of the Titans: Original Motion Picture Soundtrack

Soundtrack album by Ramin Djawadi
- Released: March 30, 2010
- Genre: Film score
- Length: 75:18
- Label: WaterTower Music
- Producer: Ramin Djawadi

Ramin Djawadi chronology
Prison Break: Season 3 & 4 (2009)	Clash of the Titans: Original Motion Picture Soundtrack (2010)	Medal of Honor (2010)

Clash of the Titans: Original Motion Picture Soundtrack is the soundtrack to the film of the same name. This music was composed by Ramin Djawadi and released on March 30, 2010. Matt Bellamy was originally hired to write the music, but abandoned the project midway through after his band Muse started a tour. Craig Armstrong was then attached to the project before leaving. Djawadi was brought in two weeks before the release of the film, so the soundtrack includes additional music by Geoff Zanelli, Bobby Tahouri and Dominic Lewis.

== Track listing ==
No.	Title	Length
1.	"The Storm that Brought Me to You" (with Neil Davidge and Tina Dico)	4:50
2.	"There Is a God in You"	1:38
3.	"Perseus"	6:34
4.	"You Can't Hide from Hades"	3:30
5.	"Medusa"	4:07
6.	"Scorpiox"	3:23
7.	"Argos"	1:53
8.	"You Fall, You Die"	1:14
9.	"Written in the Stars"	2:54
10.	"Pegasus"	2:22
11.	"Bring Everything (But the Owl)"	1:47
12.	"Killed by a God"	1:50
13.	"Djinn"	1:56
14.	"Eyes Down"	1:56
15.	"You Were Saved for a Reason"	1:20
16.	"Redemption Through Blood"	2:14
17.	"I Have Everything I Need"	3:15
18.	"King Acrisius"	2:27
19.	"It's Expensive Where You're Going"	2:50
20.	"Be My Weapon"	10:09
21.	"The Best of Both"	1:29
22.	"Release the Kraken"	6:04
23.	"It's Almost Human of You"	3:15
Total length:		75:18
