= The Unborn (2009 film) =

American supernatural horror film

- Theatrical release poster
- Directed by: David S. Goyer
- Written by: David S. Goyer
- Produced by: Michael Bay; Andrew Form; Brad Fuller
- Starring: Odette Yustman; Gary Oldman; Meagan Good; Cam Gigandet; James Remar; Jane Alexander; Idris Elba
- Cinematography: James Hawkinson
- Edited by: Jeff Betancourt
- Music by: Ramin Djawadi
- Production companies: Rogue Pictures; Platinum Dunes; Phantom Four Films
- Distributed by: Universal Pictures
- Release date: January 9, 2009
- Running time: 87 minutes
- Country: United States
- Language: English
- Budget: $16 million
- Box office: $76.5 million

The Unborn is a 2009 American supernatural horror film written and directed by David S. Goyer. Produced by Rogue Pictures, Relativity Media, Platinum Dunes and Phantom Four Films, the film stars Odette Yustman, Gary Oldman, Meagan Good, Cam Gigandet, James Remar, Jane Alexander, and Idris Elba. The film follows a young girl named Casey Beldon who is tormented by a dybbuk, and seeks help from a rabbi named Joseph Sendak. The dybbuk seeks to use her death as a gateway to physical existence.

The Unborn was theatrically released in the United States on January 9, 2009, by Universal Pictures. It received negative reviews from critics and was a box-office success, grossing $77 million against a budget of $16 million.

== Plot ==
Casey Beldon has nightmarish hallucinations of strange-looking dogs in the neighborhood and an evil child with bright blue eyes following her around. While babysitting Matty, her neighbor's son, she finds him showing his infant sibling its reflection in a mirror. Matty attacks Casey, smashing the mirror on her head, and tells her, "Jumby wants to be born now". She puts him to bed and leaves in shock.

Casey's friend Romy tells her about a superstition that newborns should not see their reflections in the mirror for at least a year because otherwise, they will die soon. Casey's eyes begin to change color; a doctor asks if she is a twin, and explains the change as tetragametic chimerism and heterochromia, and that it is entirely normal. Her neighbor's infant dies, supporting the superstition.

Casey's father admits that she had a twin brother who died while he was in the womb when her umbilical cord strangled him, and whom he and Casey's late mother, Janet, had nicknamed "Jumby". She begins to suspect that the spirit is haunting her, and this is the spirit of her unborn twin, wanting to be born so it can enter the world of the living as evil.

Casey meets Sofi Kozma (whom she later learns is her grandmother). Sofi explains that as a child she had a twin brother, Barto, who died during Nazi experiments conducted by Dr. Josef Mengele in Auschwitz during World War II. A dybbuk brought her brother back to life to use as a portal into the world of the living, but Sofi killed Barto to stop the spirit, and now it haunts her family for revenge, which is why Casey's mother went insane and committed suicide.

Sofi gives Casey a hamsa amulet for protection, instructs her to destroy all mirrors and burn the shards, and refers her to Rabbi Joseph Sendak, who can perform a Jewish exorcism to remove the dybbuk from her soul. Sendak does not believe Casey's story until he sees a dog with its head twisted upside-down in his synagogue. The dybbuk kills Sofi, then Romy soon after. Casey and her boyfriend Mark see the spirit after it kills Romy and realize it is growing stronger.

Sendak, Mark, Episcopal priest Arthur Wyndham, and other volunteers begin the exorcism, but the dybbuk attacks them, and several are wounded or killed. The spirit, having possessed the priest, chases Casey and Mark. Mark knocks Wyndham unconscious but gets possessed. Casey stabs Mark in the neck with the amulet. Sendak arrives, and he and Casey complete the exorcism. The rite draws the dybbuk out of the human world, but Mark falls and dies during the separation.

Casey mourns her boyfriend but wonders why the dybbuk suddenly became active in her life now. She takes a pregnancy test and learns she is pregnant with Mark's twins.

== Cast ==
- Odette Yustman as Casey Beldon: a young woman who is paranoid after becoming the centerpiece to a series of supernatural and strange events; eye color, hallucinations, dreams, and seeing strange things. Casey later learns she had a twin that died in the womb, this is all happening to her because a dybbuk (a spirit trapped between worlds) sees her as a doorway to return to the mortal world.
- Meagan Good as Romy Marshall: Casey's superstitious and loyal best friend. Romy is amongst those targeted by the dybbuk to effectively weaken Casey to make her vulnerable.
- Gary Oldman as Rabbi Joseph Sendak: A rabbi who Casey confides in to stop the spirit.
- Cam Gigandet as Mark Hardigan: Casey's skeptical but supportive boyfriend. Initially he is doubtful of all the transpiring events, but he later becomes helpful for Casey.
- James Remar as Gordon Beldon: Casey's father.
- Jane Alexander as Sofi Kozma: A survivor of the Nazi concentration camp Auschwitz, who is revealed to be Janet's biological mother and Casey's grandmother. Following the traumatizing possession and target by the dybbuk in the 1940s, Sofi becomes knowledgeable to avoid the spirit, and becomes a guide for Casey.
- Idris Elba as Arthur Wyndham: A Priest who assists in Casey's exorcism.
- Carla Gugino as Janet Beldon: Casey's deceased mother, who was clinically depressed and committed suicide when Casey was a young girl. Janet committed suicide after becoming a target by the dybbuk attempting to gain access to the mortal realm, and the mental effects drove her to commit suicide.
- Atticus Shaffer as Matty Newton: A neighborhood boy whom Casey babysits and begins exhibiting odd behavior over the course of the film.
- Ethan Cutkosky as Barto: Sofi's twin brother who died in Auschwitz during a Nazi experiment on twins. A dybbuk saw him as a chance to get in the mortal realm, and resurrected him to get into the mortal world. To stop it, Sofi killed "Barto" out of intention to defeat the spirit. The dybbuk continued to appear in the form of Barto throughout the film, ultimately having merged with his soul.
- Rhys Coiro as Mr. Shields: Casey's college professor.
- Michael Sassone as Eli Walker: An old man in the senior citizen's home Sofi lives at.
- Rachel Brosnahan as Lisa: A friend of Casey and Mark
- C. S. Lee as Dr. Lester Caldwell

== Reception ==
=== Box office ===
In the United States, The Unborn opened at the third position, grossing $19,810,585 averaging $8,405 at 2,357 sites. It spent eight weeks in release and had a final gross of $42,670,410. Worldwide, the film grossed $76,710,644.

=== Critical response ===
The Unborn received mostly negative reviews from critics upon release. The review aggregation website Rotten Tomatoes reported that out of 117 critic reviews, 11% of them were positive, with an average rating of 3.2/10. The site's consensus states: "David Goyer's Unborn is a tame genre effort with cheap thrills and scares that border on silliness." Metacritic assigned the film a weighted average score of 30 out of 100, based on 16 critics, indicating "generally unfavorable" reviews. Audiences polled by CinemaScore gave the film an average grade of "B−" on an A+ to F scale.

== Soundtrack ==
The Unborn: Original Motion Picture Soundtrack

Film score by Ramin Djawadi
- Released: February 24, 2009
- Genre: Soundtrack
- Label: Lakeshore Records LKS 340652
- Producer: Ramin Djawadi

Ramin Djawadi chronology
Iron Man (2008)	The Unborn: Original Motion Picture Soundtrack (2009)	Prison Break: Season 3 & 4 (2009)

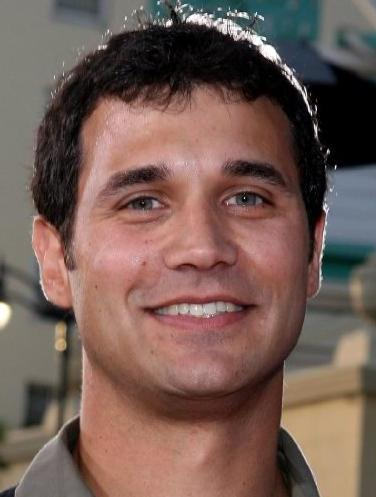
Ramin Djawadi is the composer of The Unborn score.

The film score for The Unborn was composed by Ramin Djawadi. The soundtrack album was released on February 24, 2009, via Lakeshore Records label. The main theme"The Unborn " have gained popularity over the years and has been used in various other visual media.

No.	Title	Length
1.	"The Unborn"	4:17
2.	"The Glove"	2:07
3.	"Jumby Wants to Be Born Now"	1:24
4.	"Twins"	1:55
5.	"Mom's Room"	2:22
6.	"Barto"	2:12
7.	"Possessed"	3:15
8.	"Experiments"	3:34
9.	"Breakin' Mirrors"	2:18
10.	"Dybbuk"	1:12
11.	"The Doorway's Open"	2:38
12.	"Sophie's Letter"	2:18
13.	"Medicine Cabinet"	1:59
14.	"Bugs"	2:01
15.	"Book of Mirrors"	2:27
16.	"Circle of Trust"	2:47
17.	"Hex or Schism"	4:43
18.	"Inhabit the Helpless"	1:13
19.	"Sefer Ha-Marot"	2:49
20.	"Casey"	1:22

== Home media ==
The Unborn was released on region 1 DVD and Blu-ray July 7, 2009 and on June 22, 2009, in Region 2. The DVD includes both the theatrical version (88 minutes) and the unrated cut (89 minutes), as well as deleted scenes. The Blu-ray release contains the DVD features plus two exclusive BD Live features.
