= Medal of Honor (soundtrack) =

Soundtrack album by Ramin Djawadi
- Released: September 28, 2010
- Recorded: 2009–2010
- Genre: Video game soundtrack
- Length: 59:35; 78:06 (extra tracks)
- Label: E.A.R.S
- Producer: Ramin Djawadi

Ramin Djawadi soundtrack chronology
Clash of the Titans (2008)	Medal of Honor (2010)	Game of Thrones: Season 1 (2011)

Singles from Medal of Honor
- 1. "The Catalyst" Released: August 2, 2010

Medal of Honor is a soundtrack album of Ramin Djawadi from the 2010 first-person shooter video game Medal of Honor. The first official single from the soundtrack was Linkin Park's song "The Catalyst", which was used to promote the game. An extended version of the soundtrack was released in the Medal of Honor Soundtrack Collection, which contains all of the music in the Medal of Honor franchise released up to that point and was released on March 1, 2011.

== Background ==
The music for Medal of Honor was composed by Ramin Djawadi.

== Release ==
The official soundtrack was released on September 28, 2010, on iTunes and Amazon, nearly half a month before the release of the game. The soundtrack consists of 20 tracks, including multiple variations of "The Catalyst". The song was also released as a promotional single for the soundtrack. A separate video of the song was published, which featured the scenes from the game.

Themes from the previous game reappear as well, in slightly altered form. An insert featuring promotional artwork was included with retail copies of Battlefield 3, featuring little more than a picture and a BBFC logo. On February 23, 2012, Medal of Honor: Warfighter was officially unveiled, alongside promotional artwork. Reception to the sequel was mixed to overwhelmingly negative.

== Track listing ==
All music is composed by Ramin Djawadi.

Digital release
No.	Title	Length
1.	"From Here"	3:50
2.	"Watch Your Corners"	3:20
3.	"Heroes Aboard"	5:10
4.	"Streets of Gardez"	3:56
5.	"The Time Is Upon Us"	2:02
6.	"Hunter-Killer"	2:21
7.	"Falling Away"	2:49
8.	"Taking The Field"	2:27
9.	"High Ground"	2:28
10.	"Thirty Seconds Out"	1:59
11.	"The Summit"	2:47
12.	"Paint 'Em Up"	2:32
13.	"Enemy Down"	2:50
14.	"All Rounds Expended"	3:10
15.	"Send In The Rangers"	3:21
16.	"Tariq's Plea"	4:08
17.	"WFO"	2:37
18.	"Final Extraction"	3:43
19.	"H-Hour"	2:13
20.	"Wiyar"	2:04
Total length:		59:35

Medal of Honor: Soundtrack Collection/(CD 7): Medal of Honor (2010) Extra Tracks (physical release)
No.	Title	Length
21.	"Aftermath"	2:28
22.	"Fire"	1:56
23.	"Go Loud"	1:05
24.	"Hindu Kush Remix"	1:22
25.	"Last Peel"	2:17
26.	"Mobilize The QRF"	2:27
27.	"Soar"	2:05
28.	"Time To Move"	2:17
29.	"Tower Siege"	2:38
Total length:		18:31

Promotional single
No.	Title	Writer(s)	Length
30.	"The Catalyst"	Linkin Park	5:42
