= Prison Break: Season 3 & 4 (soundtrack) =

Soundtrack album by Ramin Djawadi
- Released: June 2, 2009
- Recorded: 2007–2009
- Genre: Soundtrack
- Length: 48:21
- Label: Varèse Sarabande
- Producer: Ramin Djawadi

Ramin Djawadi soundtrack chronology
The Unborn (2009)	Prison Break: Season 3 & 4 (2009)	Clash of the Titans (2009)

Prison Break: Season 3 & 4 is the second soundtrack of the American television series Prison Break, composed by Ramin Djawadi, bringing together music used for the third and fourth season. Released in June 2009, the album includes twenty-one music composed specially for seasons 3 and 4 of Prison Break.

The album contains only the creations of Ramin Djawadi, thus, all other music or songs used in the series are not present.

== Track listing ==
All music by Ramin Djawadi.

No.	Title	Length
1.	"Main Title (Season 3)"	0.35
2.	"Michael Scofield"	1.24
3.	"Dirt Nap"	2.13
4.	"Aim For The Heart"	3.34
5.	"Fin Del Camino"	1.51
6.	"Orientaciòn"	2.06
7.	"Just Business"	2.08
8.	"Pasiòn"	2.49
9.	"Chicken Foot"	1.38
10.	"The 6 P's"	1.35
11.	"Breaking and Entering"	3.00
12.	"Selfless"	1.04
13.	"Scylla"	3.18
14.	"Bang and Burn"	2.38
15.	"Safe and Sound"	3.51
16.	"The Art of the Deal"	2.25
17.	"Happily Ever After"	1.51
18.	"Revenge"	1.38
19.	"Free"	2.48
20.	"Spark of Love"	2.03
21.	"End of the Tunnel"	3.52
Total length:		48:21

== Credits and personnel ==
Personnel adapted from the album liner notes.

- Geoff Bywater – Music Administrator
- Tom Cavanaugh – Music Business Affairs
- Ramin Djawadi – Arranger, Composer, Primary Artist, Producer
- Carol Farhat – Music Production Supervisor
- Bryce Jacobs – Personal Assistant
- David Klotz – Music Editor

- Erick Labson – Mastering
- Jeffrey Taylor Light – Public Relations
- Michelle Silverman – Music Supervisor
- Rob Simon – Technical Advisor
- Robert Townson – Executive Producer
