= Brian Kirk =

Irish film and television director

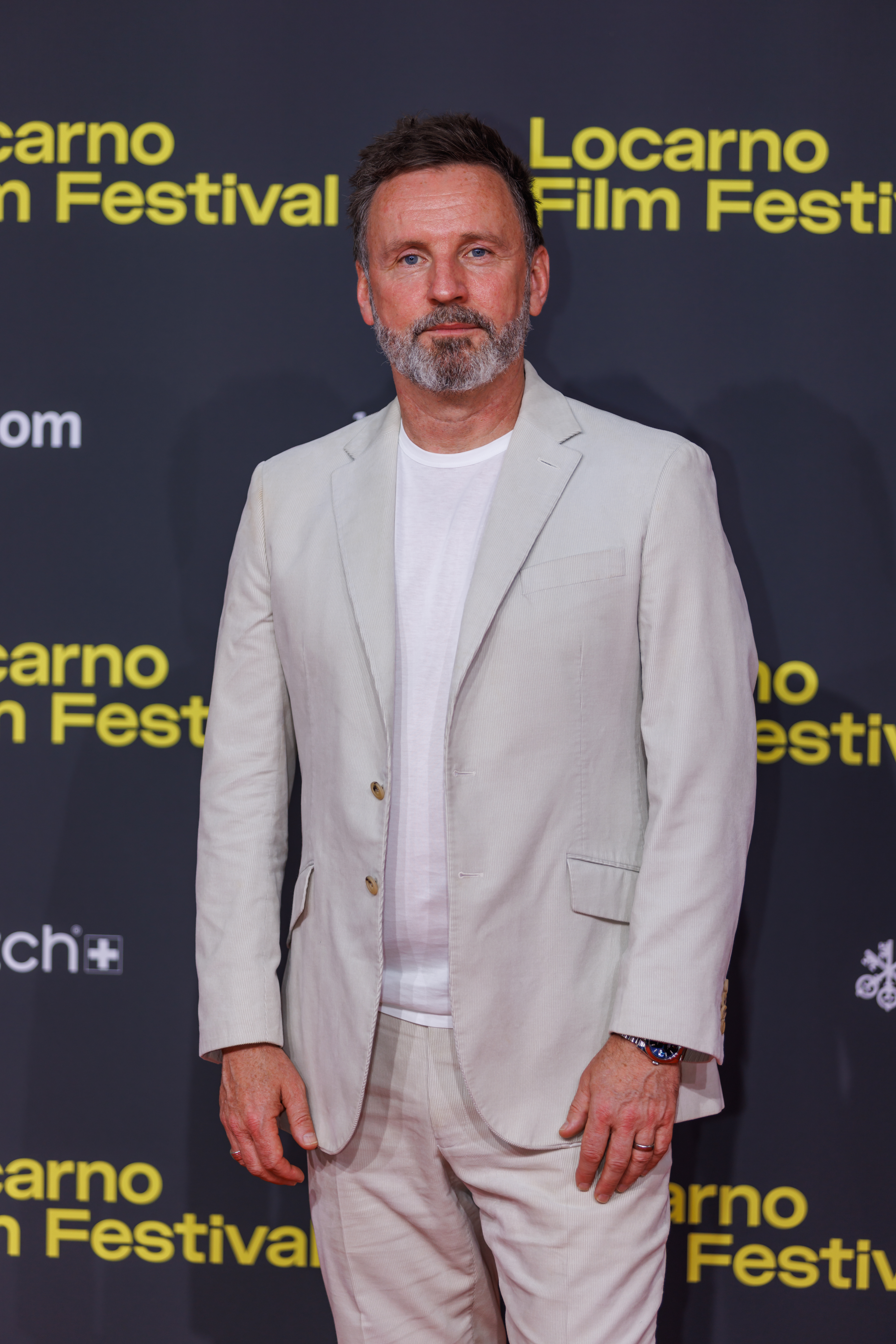
- Kirk in 2025
- Occupations: Director; television producer

Brian Kirk is an Irish film and television director from Northern Ireland who has directed episodes of Game of Thrones, FX's The Riches and Showtime's Brotherhood and The Tudors. He also directed the television film My Boy Jack starring David Haig and Daniel Radcliffe and based on the play of the same name.

== Career ==
Kirk had been named to direct the thriller Midnight Delivery for Universal Pictures. Guillermo del Toro would have produced the film. In July 2013, Kevin Costner was in talks to star in the film. The film is currently in development hell.

== Filmography ==
Film

- Middletown (2006)
- Cherrybomb (2009, producer)
- 21 Bridges (2019)
- Dead of Winter (2025)

Television

- Any Time Now (2002)
  - Episode #1.03
  - Episode #1.04
- Pulling Moves (2004)
  - Episode #1.01: "Claimitis"
  - Episode #1.02: "Meat Is Murder"
  - Episode #1.03: "The Quiz"
  - Episode #1.04: "Dog Eat Dog"
  - Episode #1.05: "Spousal Arousal"
- Murphy's Law (2004–2005)
  - Episode #2.01: "Jack's Back"
  - Episode #2.02: "Bent Moon on the Rise"
  - Episode #3.01: "The Goodbye Look"
  - Episode #3.03: "Strongbox"
- Funland (2005)
  - Episode #1.08
  - Episode #1.09
  - Episode #1.10
  - Episode #1.11
- The Riches (2007)
  - Episode #1.05: "The Big Floss"
  - Episode #1.07: "Virgin Territory"
- The Tudors (2007)
  - Episode #1.05: "Arise, My Lord"
  - Episode #1.06: "True Love"
- Brotherhood (2006–2007)
  - Episode #1.10: "Vivekchaudamani" 51 (2006)
  - Episode #2.02: "Down in the Flood 3:5-6"
- My Boy Jack (2007) (TV movie)
- Father & Son (2009)
- Dexter (2009)
  - Episode #4.02: "Remains to Be Seen"
- Luther (2010)
  - Episode #1.01: "Episode 1"
  - Episode #1.02: "Episode 2"
- Boardwalk Empire (2010)
  - Episode #1.08: "Hold Me in Paradise"
- Game of Thrones (2011)
  - Episode #1.03: "Lord Snow"
  - Episode #1.04: "Cripples, Bastards, and Broken Things"
  - Episode #1.05: "The Wolf and the Lion"
- Great Expectations (2011)
- Luck (2012)
  - Episode #1.05: "Episode Five"
  - Episode #1.07: "Episode Seven"
- Rogue (2013)
  - Episode #1.01: "The Aquarium"
- Penny Dreadful (2015)
  - Episode #2.03: "The Nightcomers"
  - Episode #2.07: "Little Scorpion"
  - Episode #2.09: "And Hell Itself My Only Foe"
  - Episode #2.10: "And They Were Enemies"
- Hard Sun (2018)
  - Episode #1.01: "The Sun, The Moon, The Truth"
  - Episode #1.02: "One Thousand, Eight Hundred Days"
- Citadel (2023; executive producer)
- The Day of the Jackal (2024, also executive producer)
  - Episode #1.01: "Episode 1"
  - Episode #1.02: "Episode 2"
  - Episode #1.03: "Episode 3"
