= Winter Is Coming =

- Game of Thrones episode
- Episode no.: Season 1 Episode 1
- Directed by: Tim Van Patten
- Written by: David Benioff; D. B. Weiss
- Cinematography by: Alik Sakharov
- Editing by: Oral Norrie Ottey
- Original air date: April 17, 2011
- Running time: 61 minutes

Guest appearances
- Donald Sumpter as Maester Luwin; Jamie Sives as Jory Cassel; Ron Donachie as Rodrik Cassel; Joseph Mawle as Benjen Stark; Roger Allam as Magister Illyrio; Dar Salim as Qotho; Esmé Bianco as Ros; Susan Brown as Septa Mordane; Bronson Webb as Will; John Standing as Jon Arryn; Rob Ostlere as Waymar Royce; Dermot Keaney as Gared; Art Parkinson as Rickon Stark; Callum Wharry as Tommen Baratheon; Aimee Richardson as Myrcella Baratheon; Kristian Nairn as Hodor; Ian Whyte and Spencer Wilding as a White Walker; Jason Momoa as Khal Drogo

Episode chronology
← Previous —	Next → "The Kingsroad"
- Game of Thrones season 1

"Winter Is Coming" is the series premiere of the HBO medieval fantasy television series Game of Thrones. The first episode of the first season, it was written by series creators David Benioff and D. B. Weiss, in an adaptation of the first chapters of George R. R. Martin's book A Game of Thrones. The episode was directed by Tim Van Patten, redoing the work done by director Tom McCarthy in an unaired pilot.

As the first episode of the series, it introduces the setting and the main characters of the show. The episode focuses on the Stark family and how Eddard "Ned" Stark becomes involved in court politics after King Robert Baratheon appoints him to replace his recently deceased chief administrator, Hand of the King Jon Arryn. The episode received highly positive reviews, with major praise going to the acting performances and production values, and was initially seen by 2.2 million viewers. A week before the episode first aired, HBO made the first 15 minutes available as an internet preview.

The title of the episode is the motto (referred to as "House Words" in-universe) of House Stark, which is spoken several times in the episode and the series.

== Plot ==
=== Beyond the Wall ===
On the continent of Westeros, rangers of the Night's Watch scout the forest beyond the Wall, the massive ice barrier in the North, and discover demonic White Walkers and wildlings turned to undead wights. Will, the sole surviving ranger, flees south.

=== In King's Landing ===
Watching as the corpse of Jon Arryn, the Hand of the King, is tended to, Jaime Lannister assures his twin sister, Queen Cersei Lannister, that if Arryn had spoken to anyone about them, they would already have been executed.

=== In Pentos ===
Exiled prince Viserys Targaryen plots to reclaim his father's throne from King Robert Baratheon and brokers a marriage between his sister, Daenerys, and Dothraki warlord Khal Drogo. As wedding gifts, Daenerys is given books of the Seven Kingdoms (the North, the Vale, the Riverlands, the Westerlands, the Reach, the Stormlands, and Dorne) from Ser Jorah Mormont, an exiled knight loyal to House Targaryen, and three petrified dragon eggs from Magister Illyrio Mopatis, who helped arrange the marriage.

=== In the North ===
The Starks of Winterfell are introduced: Lord Eddard "Ned" Stark, his wife Lady Catelyn, their children: heir Robb, elder daughter Sansa, younger daughter Arya, ten-year-old son Bran, youngest son, Rickon, Ned's bastard son, Jon Snow, and ward Theon Greyjoy.

Ned takes his sons to witness Will's execution for desertion of the Night's Watch. Ignoring Will's warning of the White Walkers, Ned beheads him, insisting the Walkers are long extinct. The Starks find a dead stag, the sigil of House Baratheon, and a dead direwolf, the sigil of the Starks, whose pups are taken in by the children.

News arrives of the death of Lord Arryn, Ned's friend and Catelyn's brother-in-law. Winterfell receives the royal court, including King Robert, Cersei, their children—Crown Prince Joffrey, Princess Myrcella, and Prince Tommen Baratheon—as well as Jaime, a member of the Kingsguard, and his and Cersei's younger brother, Tyrion Lannister, a dwarf known as "the Imp". Robert pays respects to Lyanna Stark, his late fiancée and Ned's sister, appoints Ned as his new Hand of the King, and suggests Sansa be betrothed to Joffrey. Catelyn receives a message from her sister Lysa, Arryn's widow, who suspects the Lannisters killed her husband. Ned reluctantly accepts the position of Hand of the King.

Bran climbs an abandoned tower and discovers Cersei and Jaime having sex. To hide their incestuous and extramarital affair, Jaime shoves Bran out of the window.

== Production ==
=== Conception and development ===
A number of Hollywood studios had contacted George R. R. Martin about possibly adapting his book series A Song of Ice and Fire into a film. However, Martin expressed the opinion the books could not be made into a film as too much would have to be cut from the books, but thought it could be made into a television series. In January 2006, David Benioff happened to speak to Martin's literary agent, and the agent sent the first four books of A Song of Ice and Fire to David Benioff. Benioff read a few hundred pages of the first book in the series, A Game of Thrones, called D. B. Weiss and said: "Maybe I'm crazy, but I haven't had this much fun reading anything in about 20 years. So take a look because I think it might make a great HBO series." Weiss, who then read the first book in two days, was very enthusiastic about a possible television project based on the books. They arranged a meeting with Martin, who asked them if they knew who Jon Snow's real mother might be, and was satisfied with their answer.

In March 2006, a few weeks after meeting Martin, Benioff and Weiss pitched the show to Showtime and then Carolyn Strauss of HBO, the latter of whom accepted their proposal. HBO acquired the rights to the novels to turn them into a television series, with Benioff and Weiss as writers and executive producers of the series. The series went into development in January 2007. The series would begin with the first book from 1996, "A Game of Thrones", with the intention that each novel in the series would form the basis for a season's worth of episodes. However, Benioff and Weiss had to resubmit a proposal after Carolyn Strauss stepped down as president of HBO in 2008. The first and second drafts of the pilot script, written by Benioff and Weiss, were submitted in August 2007 and June 2008 respectively. While HBO found both drafts to their liking, a pilot was not ordered until November 2008.

=== Writing ===
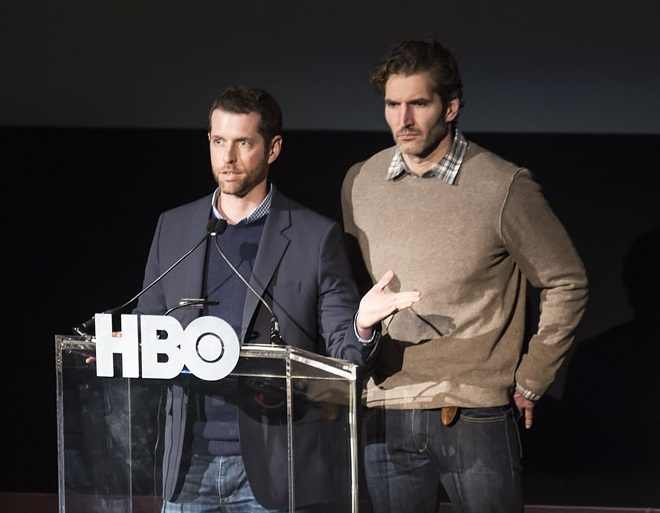
Series co-creators David Benioff and D. B. Weiss wrote the episode.

Scripted by the show creators David Benioff and D. B. Weiss, the first episode includes the plot of the book's chapters 1–9 and 12 (Prologue, Bran I, Catelyn I, Daenerys I, Eddard I, Jon I, Catelyn II, partial Arya I, Bran II, Daenerys II). Changes in the adaptation include the sequence of events in the prologue (in the books it is Gared and not Will who survives and is beheaded by Eddard afterwards, and Arya's material is set before the arrival of the royal family), new scenes showing the Lannister twins' perspective, and Daenerys's wedding night showing Drogo not waiting for her to consent to sex.

=== Original pilot ===
Tom McCarthy was chosen to direct the pilot episode, shot between October 24 and November 19, 2009, on location in Northern Ireland, Scotland and Morocco. However, the pilot was poorly received in a private viewing with friends, one of whom, Craig Mazin, said to Benioff and Weiss, "You guys have a massive problem", and said "change everything" when asked for ideas. It was so disliked that Kit Harington joked that when he annoys Benioff and Weiss, they threaten to release the episode on YouTube. Weiss said of the viewing: "Watching them watch the pilot was a deeply humiliating, painful experience, because these are very smart individuals, and it just clearly wasn’t working for any of them on a very basic level." For example, it was never established that Jaime and Cersei Lannister were in fact brother and sister, a major plot point.

HBO did not make a decision for four months after the pilot was delivered. In March 2010, HBO's decision to greenlight the series was announced, with the production of the series scheduled to start June 2010. HBO however demanded the first episode be reshot, and wanted all the scenes from Morocco scrapped. A cameo appearance by George R.R. Martin as a Pentoshi nobleman at Daenerys's wedding filmed in Morocco was therefore also cut. Around 90 percent of the pilot was re-shot in 2010, with some cast changes and a different director.

=== Re-filming ===
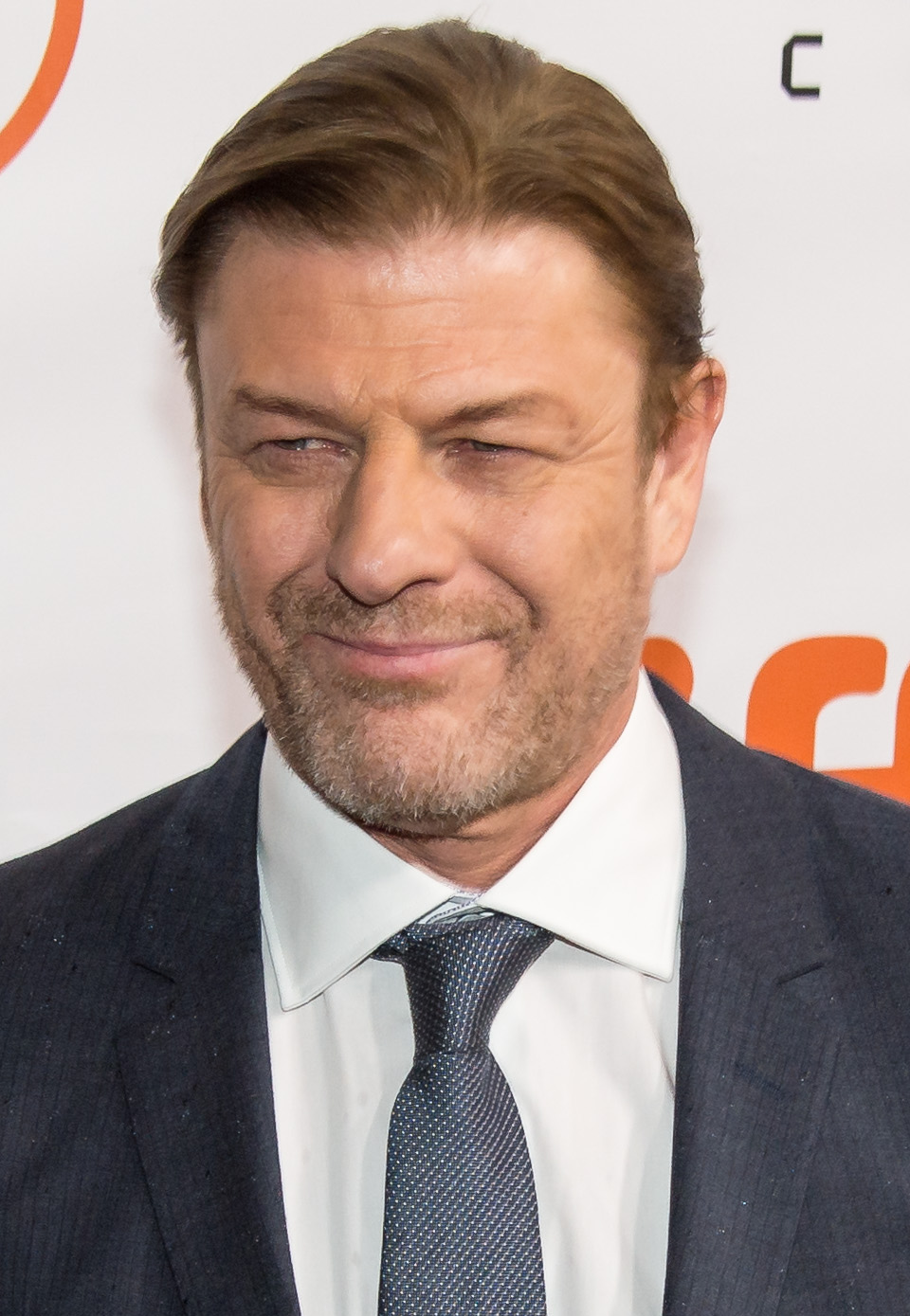
Sean Bean portrays Ned Stark in the series.

The new first episode was filmed in 2010 by new director Tim Van Patten, and several actors appearing in the original pilot did not return for the series. Tamzin Merchant was replaced as Daenerys Targaryen by Emilia Clarke, and Jennifer Ehle was replaced as Catelyn Stark by Michelle Fairley. Additionally, Ian McNeice was replaced as Magister Illyrio by Roger Allam, Richard Ridings as Gared by Dermot Keaney, and Jamie Campbell Bower as Ser Waymar Royce by Rob Ostlere.

Another difference is that the original pilot featured scenes shot in Scotland and scenes in Pentos were shot in Morocco, but in the aired series, Winterfell was filmed in a combination of locations in Northern Ireland, while scenes from Pentos were from Malta. Doune Castle in Scotland was originally used to recreate Winterfell, and its great hall was used for some interior shots. Some scenes survived, but as it was not practical to return to Scotland for the reshoot, an exact replica of Doune's great hall was recreated in the soundstage in Belfast for the series. Castle Ward in Northern Ireland was used in the reshoot to film King Robert's entourage entry into Winterfell castle. A car park stood in for the Winterfell castle's courtyard and a wine cellar for the Stark family crypt. Tollymore Forest Park was used for the opening scene of the encounter with the White Walkers.

All the scenes shot in Morocco were reshot in Malta. The original pilot reused the sets of Kingdom of Heaven in Morocco to stand in for Pentos and the site of Drogo and Daenerys's wedding. In Malta, the Verdala Palace, the 16th century summer palace of the president of Malta, was used for the exterior scenes at Illyrio's mansion. The Azure Window was used as the backdrop for the wedding. Filming at the Azure Window, however, caused some controversy when a protected ecosystem was damaged by a subcontractor.

In the sex scene from the pilot, the then-pregnant Lena Headey was substituted by a body double. In the scene in which the Starks encounter a stag killed by a dire wolf as they return from the execution, an actual animal was used rather than a prop. As the stag had been dead for two days, it stank so much that the actors had to take much care not to let it show on their faces. Some scenes filmed were unaired, for example a flashback to the deaths of Eddard Stark's brother and Jon Arryn.

=== Aired episode ===
The original pilot remains unaired, although some footage from it was used in the first aired episode. This includes Sansa's scenes with Catelyn (Michelle Fairley's footage as Catelyn was inserted over Jennifer Ehle's performance), Will's ride through the woods (retained though also portrayed by a different actor), most of the feast at Winterfell, and Ned and Robert's scene in the crypt. That scene is one of a few to be filmed on 35 mm film, and consequently slight film grain can be seen in the HD version of the episode.

== Reception ==
=== Preview ===
On April 3, 2011, two weeks before the series premiere aired, the first 15 minutes of "Winter Is Coming" were released as a preview on HBO's website. Wired's Dave Banks called the preview "much better than anticipated." Scott Stinson of Toronto's National Post noted that "you know you aren’t watching a network drama when there have been two beheadings in the first 15 minutes."

=== Ratings ===
The first episode of Game of Thrones obtained 2.2 million viewers in its premiere airing, with an additional 2 million viewers in the reruns that aired during the same night. The day after the premiere HBO aired the episode six additional times, adding another 1.2 million to the viewer's figures. Reruns aired during the following week upped the total viewership to 6.8 million.

=== International ===
The show premiered on HBO Canada at the same time as its U.S. premiere. On April 18, 2011, the show premiered in the United Kingdom and Ireland through Sky Atlantic, gathering 750,000 viewers, a ratings record for the network. The series was broadcast throughout Latin America beginning on May 8, 2011. New Zealand's Dominion Post noted in an article on copyright laws that the popular series was downloaded via file sharing service regularly before its release to that market. In Australia, the July 17 premiere of the series was largely overshadowed by the release of A Dance with Dragons, but according to The Sydney Morning Herald was successful "especially with women, who aren't seen as a target market for sword-fighting sagas".

=== Critical response ===
The critical response to the first episode of the series was positive. Review aggregator Rotten Tomatoes surveyed 15 reviews of the episode and judged all of them to be positive with an average score of 8.5 out of 10. The website's critical consensus reads, "'Winter is Coming' is an introduction to a wonderfully bleak journey that honors its source material with stellar execution and an impressive cast." James Poniewozik from Time considered it an "epic win", and Jace Lacob from The Daily Beast deemed it "unforgettable". HitFix's Alan Sepinwall wrote that while it was too early to say if Game of Thrones belonged to the HBO pantheon with shows like The Sopranos or The Wire, it had many things in common with those shows. IGN's Matt Fowler wrote that the episode "effortlessly takes us along, faithfully, through the book, but it also manages to capture the majestically morbid spirit of Martin's pages and turn them into thrilling television".

Much praise was given to the production values and the acting: Scott Meslow from The Atlantic states that "the show's immense cast is almost universally strong, and the fantasy land of Westeros feels lived-in, and looks terrific". Alan Sepinwall also qualifies the casting as "really exceptional", and states that the show is "feast for the eyes", with all the different locations having their own memorable looks. The opening sequence, with an aerial view of the world where the series takes place with the different settings emerging from it, was also acclaimed.

On April 19, less than two days after the initial airing, HBO announced that the series had been renewed for a second season. In a press teleconference, HBO executives announced their satisfaction with initial ratings, which they compared favorably to True Blood.

=== Awards and nominations ===
Year	Award	Category	Nominees	Result	Ref.
2011	Portal Award	Best Episode		Won	
2011	Primetime Emmy Awards	Outstanding Directing for a Drama Series	Tim Van Patten	Nominated	
2011	Primetime Creative Arts Emmy Awards	Outstanding Make-up for a Single-Camera Series (Non-Prosthetic)	Paul Engelen and Melissa Lackersteen	Nominated	
2012	Golden Reel Awards	Best Sound Editing — Short Form Sound Effects and Foley in Television		Won	
2012	Directors Guild of America Awards	Dramatic Series	Tim Van Patten	Nominated	
2012	Visual Effects Society	Outstanding Supporting Visual Effects in a Broadcast Program	Lucy Ainsworth-Taylor, Angela Barson, Ed Bruce and Adam McInnes	Won	

== See also ==
- outline of A Song of Ice and Fire
