= Cripples, Bastards, and Broken Things =

- Game of Thrones episode
- Episode no.: Season 1 Episode 4
- Directed by: Brian Kirk
- Written by: Bryan Cogman
- Cinematography by: Marco Pontecorvo
- Editing by: Frances Parker
- Original air date: May 8, 2011
- Running time: 55 minutes

Guest appearances
- Donald Sumpter as Maester Luwin; Conleth Hill as Varys; Jerome Flynn as Bronn; Owen Teale as Alliser Thorne; Jamie Sives as Jory Cassel; Ron Donachie as Rodrik Cassel; Francis Magee as Yoren; Ian McElhinney as Barristan Selmy; Dominic Carter as Janos Slynt; Julian Glover as Grand Maester Pycelle; Gethin Anthony as Renly Baratheon; Emun Elliott as Marillion; Susan Brown as Septa Mordane; Margaret John as Old Nan; John Bradley as Samwell Tarly; Mark Stanley as Grenn; Josef Altin as Pypar; Luke McEwan as Rast; Conan Stevens as Gregor Clegane; Amrita Acharia as Irri; Roxanne McKee as Doreah; Kristian Nairn as Hodor; Jefferson Hall as Hugh of the Vale; Joe Dempsie as Gendry; Andrew Wilde as Tobho Motte; Callum Wharry as Tommen Baratheon; Aimee Richardson as Myrcella Baratheon; Jason Momoa as Khal Drogo

Episode chronology
← Previous "Lord Snow"	Next → "The Wolf and the Lion"
- Game of Thrones season 1

"Cripples, Bastards, and Broken Things" is the fourth episode of the first season of the HBO medieval fantasy television series Game of Thrones, which first aired on May 8, 2011. It was written by Bryan Cogman and directed by Brian Kirk.

In this episode, Ned Stark, the new Hand of the King, investigates the sudden death of his predecessor. Jon Snow, Ned's bastard son, defends a new recruit who has just joined the rangers at the Wall. Exiled prince Viserys Targaryen becomes increasingly frustrated as the Dothraki horde he needs to invade Westeros and win back his crown continues to linger at Vaes Dothrak. The episode ends with Ned's wife Catelyn arresting Tyrion Lannister on suspicion of attempting to murder her son Bran.

The title comes from the original book, spoken by Tyrion after he provides Bran with a saddle design that will allow him to ride despite his paraplegia: "I have a tender spot in my heart for cripples and bastards and broken things."

Critical reaction to the episode was mostly positive, with critics citing the Night's Watch scenes at the Wall as highlights, as well as the performances of Michelle Fairley as Catelyn and Peter Dinklage as Tyrion, particularly during the episode's final scene. In the United States, the episode achieved a viewership of 2.5 million in its initial broadcast.

== Plot ==
=== In King's Landing ===
Ned quietly inquires into the death of Jon Arryn, his mentor and predecessor as Hand of the King. He questions Pycelle, who tended to Arryn in his final days, and learns Arryn's last words were "the seed is strong", and that he was researching the houses of the Seven Kingdoms.

Helped by Littlefinger and his web of informants, Ned questions Gendry, a smith's apprentice whom Arryn had visited, and deduces that Gendry is a bastard of Robert. Ned plans to question Arryn's former squire Ser Hugh of the Vale, but the latter is killed by Ser Gregor "The Mountain" Clegane in a jousting tournament.

=== In Vaes Dothrak ===
Drogo's khalasar arrives at the city of Vaes Dothrak. Daenerys fights back against Viserys, who grows impatient for control of Drogo's army to reconquer the Seven Kingdoms. Jorah tells Daenerys that the people of the Seven Kingdoms do not care who rules them as long as they are ruled well, and Daenerys agrees that Viserys would be a poor conqueror.

=== At the Wall ===
The Night's Watch receives Samwell Tarly, an obese, fearful, and clumsy recruit who becomes an easy target for Thorne. Sam explains to Jon that his father forced him to join and forsake his inheritance because he considered Sam unworthy. Jon defends Sam from their fellow recruits, and Thorne warns them to toughen up if they are to survive.

=== At Winterfell ===
On his way to King's Landing, Tyrion receives a cold welcome at Winterfell from Robb, acting Lord of the castle in his father's absence. Despite Robb's suspicion that the Lannisters are behind the attempts on Bran's life, Tyrion gives Bran designs for a saddle for him to ride despite his paralysis. Before leaving, Tyrion taunts Theon for the Greyjoys' failed rebellion against Robert, calling Theon a "hostage" to the Starks.

=== At the Inn at the Crossroads ===
Further south, Tyrion and his retinue intend to spend the night at the Inn at the Crossroads, where he recognizes Catelyn in disguise. She calls upon her father's bannermen to seize Tyrion to face trial for Bran's attempted murder.

== Production ==
=== Writing ===
"Cripples, Bastards, and Broken Things" is the first episode of the series that was not written by the show's creators and executive producers David Benioff and D. B. Weiss. The script was authored by writer Bryan Cogman, based on George R. R. Martin's original work.

"Thankfully, when the opportunity came for a script to be written, the guys said, well, no one knows these characters better than Bryan - let's give him a try! I thought it was just an exercise when David came up and asked if I wanted to take a crack for episode four, I said, 'Oh! Well, that's nice, trying to give me something to do.'

We were doing post-production on the pilot then and I didn't have quite as much to do around that time, so I thought it was a nice gesture. So I went home and wrote it and turned it in and then they said, 'Well, that's it, that's episode 4.'"

— Bryan Cogman in an interview in Westeros.org

Cogman worked on the Game of Thrones's pilot as a writing assistant and was contracted for the full series as script-editor and the unofficial "keeper of the mythos" for the show, entrusted with the task of writing the series bible outlining character and background information, and making sure that the world-building remained consistent. In this capacity, he was approached by Benioff and Weiss, who asked him to write a treatment for the fourth episode. Believing it was only an exercise that would be completely rewritten by another professional writer, he completed the script that ended up being episode four.

The chapters of the book covered in this episode are Bran IV (less the first few pages that were included in the previous episode), Eddard V, Jon IV, Eddard VI, Catelyn V, Sansa II, Daenerys IV (chapters 25–30 and 37). Among the scenes created for the show, there are the conversations between Theon and Tyrion, Sansa and Septa Mordane, Doreah and Viserys, Jory Cassel and Jaime, Jon and Samwell and Eddard Stark and Cersei. The character of Alliser Thorne is given some more depth by justifying his harshness towards the new recruits, and a more subdued version of Bran's dream is included.

During the bathtub scene in which Viserys recalls the old Targaryen dragons, he lists names taken from the books (Balerion, Meraxes and Vhagar) and others invented for the show. Among them a dragon called Vermithrax is mentioned, which is an homage to Vermithrax Pejorative from the 1981 film Dragonslayer. Author George R. R. Martin once ranked the film the fifth best fantasy movie of all time, and called Vermithrax "the best dragon ever put on film," and the one with "the coolest dragon name as well."

=== Casting ===
This episode introduces the character of Samwell Tarly, a new recruit of the Night's Watch and a self-described coward. John Bradley was cast in the part, the actor's first professional appearance after graduating from the Manchester Metropolitan School of Theatre. The scene used in the auditions belonged to "Cripples, Bastards, and Broken Things," with Sam explaining to Jon how his father forced him to take the black. According to author and executive producer George R. R. Martin, Bradley delivered "a heartbreaking performance."

Australian actor Conan Stevens, whose official website lists his height as 214 cm (7' 1/4"), first appears as the gigantic knight Gregor Clegane, known as "the Mountain." Stevens had sought to join the production since HBO started developing Game of Thrones. Since the character of Gregor Clegane, the role he believed he was most fitted for, did not appear in the pilot, he auditioned for the role of Khal Drogo instead in the hopes of getting noticed by the casting team. Although that role went to Jason Momoa, Stevens was chosen for the part of Gregor.

Other recurring roles making their first appearance in the episode include Dominic Carter as commander of the City Watch Janos Slynt, Jerome Flynn as the mercenary ("sellsword") Bronn, and Joe Dempsie as the smith's apprentice Gendry. The character of Gendry was made older for the series than he appears in the books.

=== Props ===
The book of lineages Ned receives from Pycelle was prepared by Bryan Cogman, who in addition to writing episode four also served as the show's "lore master" and authored the historical background content included in the first season's DVD and Blu-ray release. Cogman wrote two pages worth of text detailing the lineage of four noble houses. The text concerning house Umber was shown in "Cripples, Bastards, and Broken Things," and the Baratheon text appears in episode six, "A Golden Crown." Cogman also wrote text for the houses of Targaryen and Royce, but the corresponding scenes were removed from the final script for episode four. Cogman said that he drew on the novels and the fan-created website Wiki of Ice and Fire for reference, and invented what could not be sourced, including even some Internet fan message board names as in-jokes.

=== Filming locations ===
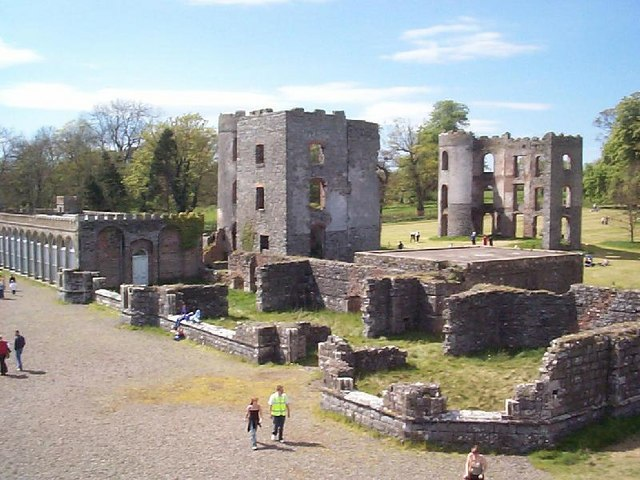
The scenes of the Tourney of the Hand were filmed at the grounds of Shane's Castle.

The episode was shot at Belfast's studio The Paint Hall, including interior shots of King's Landing, and on location throughout Northern Ireland: The scenes taking place at the grounds of Castle Black continued to be filmed at the large exterior set built on the abandoned quarry of Magheramorne, the grounds of the ruined Shane's Castle were used as the location of the tournament, and the area known as the Sandy Brae, at the foot of the Mourne Mountains, was used for the entrance to Vaes Dothrak. Much of this episode was filmed early in the production; an Eddard and Arya scene from this episode was filmed on the very first day of shooting.

== Reception ==
=== Ratings ===
"Cripples, Bastards, and Broken Things"'s first airing was seen by 2.5 million viewers, a slight increase from the previous episode's 2.4 million. Including the repeat, the night's viewers totalled 3.1 million, which was also in line with the previous week's ratings. In the UK, the viewership increased significantly, rising to 628,000 viewers from 510,000 the previous week.

=== Critical response ===
"Cripples, Bastards, and Broken Things" was received positively by critics. Review aggregator Rotten Tomatoes surveyed 19 reviews of the episode and judged 100% of them to be positive with an average score of 8.7 out of 10. The website's critical consensus reads, "Nuanced characters and a gripping plot help 'Cripples, Bastards, and Broken Things' set a new first-season benchmark for Game of Thrones." Emily VanDerWerff from The A.V. Club gave it an A−, and Maureen Ryan from AOL TV rated it with a 70 out of 100.

VanDerWerff stated this was his favorite episode of the show so far, "an hour that simultaneously feels more propulsive and more relaxed than the last three." He admitted that the better part of it was given to exposition, with many monologues by the characters to expose their motivations and background. In his opinion, though, it was done skillfully and efficiently. IGN's Matt Fowler wrote that it was another great, exposition-heavy episode and that the best and most natural scene happened between Viserys and Doreah in the bath.

Out of the different storylines, many critics singled out the scenes on the Wall as the best. Myles McNutt from Cultural Learnings wrote that "Jon Snow’s time at the Wall is maybe my favorite central location of those introduced early in the series, and it is in large part due to the work done in this episode," and Maureen Ryan stated that "they're exceptionally well acted and written. John Bradley is a great addition as Samwell Tarly, and I continue to be very impressed with Kit Harington's quietly charismatic performance as Jon." Besides the acting and the writing, both agreed that one of the reasons the Night's Watch scenes worked for them is that it was easy to connect with the story of a group of raw recruits bonding under a hard-nosed trainer who tries to prepare them to face great danger.

The closing scene was praised by HitFix's Alan Sepinwall, highlighting Michelle Fairley's acting as Catelyn gathers allies to arrest Tyrion.
