= Sansa Stark =

Fictional character in A Song of Ice and Fire

- A Song of Ice and Fire character Game of Thrones character
- Sophie Turner as Sansa Stark in the HBO adaptation Game of Thrones
- First appearance: Literature: A Game of Thrones (1996); Television: "Winter Is Coming" (2011)
- First game: Reigns: Game of Thrones (2018)
- Last appearance: Television: "The Iron Throne" (2019)
- Created by: George R. R. Martin
- Based on: Elizabeth of York
- Adapted by: D.B. Weiss & David Benioff (Game of Thrones)
- Portrayed by: Sophie Turner

In-universe information
- Aliases: Little Bird; Alayne Stone; Jonquil; Little Dove (television only)
- Gender: Female
- Titles: De facto Lady of the Eyrie; Queen in the North (television only)
- Family: House Stark; House Lannister (by marriage); House Baelish (by alias)
- Spouses: Tyrion Lannister (unconsummated); Ramsay Bolton (television only)
- Significant others: Joffrey Baratheon (former betrothed); Willas Tyrell (former betrothed); Harrold Hardyng (betrothed)
- Relatives: Eddard Stark (father); Catelyn Tully (mother); Robb Stark (brother); Arya Stark (sister); Bran Stark (brother); Rickon Stark (brother); Theon Greyjoy (foster brother); Rickard Stark (grandfather); Lyarra Stark (grandmother); Brandon Stark (uncle); Lyanna Stark (aunt); Benjen Stark (uncle); Hoster Tully (grandfather); Minisa Whent (grandmother); Lysa Tully (aunt); Edmure Tully (uncle); Brynden Tully (granduncle); Robert Arryn (cousin); Novels: Jon Snow (half-brother); Television: Jon Snow (cousin/adoptive brother)
- Origin: Winterfell, The North

Sansa Stark, later Alayne Stone, is a fictional character in the A Song of Ice and Fire series of epic fantasy novels by American author George R. R. Martin. Introduced in A Game of Thrones (1996), Sansa is the eldest daughter and second child of Lord Eddard Stark and his wife, Lady Catelyn Stark. She subsequently appeared in the following three novels: A Clash of Kings (1998), A Storm of Swords (2000), and A Feast for Crows (2005). While absent from the fifth novel, A Dance with Dragons, Sansa will return in the forthcoming book, The Winds of Winter.

In the television adaptation of Game of Thrones, she is portrayed by English actress Sophie Turner. Sansa's character development in the novels has received critical praise, though her television counterpart has been met with a more mixed reception, with some praising her development into a strong leader and others perceiving her as simply adopting her captors' and tormentors' traits while being protected by plot armor; her arc in the show's fifth season was the subject of controversy where she replaced the character of Jeyne Poole and became a stronger character in later seasons as a result of her repeated sexual abuse, with some viewing it as an attempt to replicate the MeToo movement and its slogan "Believe women". Martin himself has expressed displeasure with the showrunners' creative decisions regarding Sansa.

Turner and the rest of the cast were nominated for Screen Actors Guild Awards for Outstanding Performance by an Ensemble in a Drama Series in 2012, 2014, 2015, and 2016. Turner also received an Emmy Award nomination for Outstanding Supporting Actress in a Drama Series in 2019.

== Character and appearances ==
Sansa Stark is the second child and the elder of the two daughters born to Lord Eddard Stark and Lady Catelyn Stark, the ruling liege of the North. She was born and raised in Winterfell with an older brother Robb, a younger sister Arya, two younger brothers Bran and Rickon, and an older bastard half-brother Jon Snow. Through her mother, Sansa is also first cousin to Robert Arryn, the lord paramount of The Vale, and the niece of Edmure Tully, the lord paramount of the Riverlands. She was once betrothed to Crown Prince Joffrey Baratheon and is still legally married (though never consummated) to Tyrion Lannister by the end of A Dance with Dragons.

Raised as a noblewoman, Sansa embodies the traditional femininity stereotype expected by the Westerosi society and is widely praised as a courteous and lovable young maiden. Sansa has been described as tall, slim, womanly and classically beautiful, destined to be a lady or a queen. Inheriting from her mother, Sansa has the Tully features, blue eyes, high cheekbones, and thick auburn hair, but later has her hair dyed dark brown while hiding in the Vale under the guise of "Alayne Stone", the alleged bastard daughter of Petyr Baelish. Sansa's interests are music, poetry, and singing, and she excels in embroidery. She fantasizes about becoming like the damsels of romantic tales who will find a prince, knight, or gentleman to fall in love with. She once owned a direwolf cub named Lady, who was killed in place of Arya's direwolf Nymeria due to the latter having fled after attacking and wounding Crown Prince Joffrey.

Sansa is 11 years old at the beginning of A Game of Thrones and nearly 14 at the end of A Feast for Crows. The most naive of the Stark children at the start of the series, Sansa is smittened with her then-fiancé Joffrey and chooses to side with the treacherous Queen Cersei over her father, and is responsible for her father's political downfall and subsequent execution. She then finds herself abused by Joffrey and later is forced to marry Tyrion (who is also unwilling) as a pawn in the machinations of House Lannister's scheme to claim Winterfell. However, as the story progresses, she matures and becomes more of a strategic player in the political game.

Martin drew heavily from Elizabeth of York in the creation of Sansa’s character. Both Sansa and Elizabeth are noblewomen from the northern part of their realm and become the heir to their respective dynasties after the untimely death of their fathers and disappearance of their two younger brothers. This vaunted status makes them a key chess piece in the dynastic marriage game, although Elizabeth’s marriage grew to be a happy one unlike Sansa’s forced marriage to Tyrion Lannister. Physically, they resemble each other as well, being tall, red-headed and beautiful.

== Storylines ==
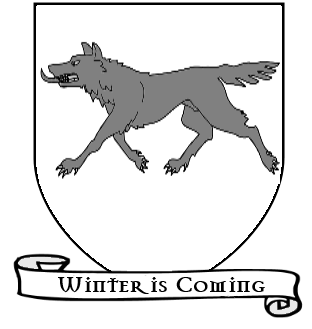
Coat of arms of House Stark

Sansa is a prominent point-of-view character and had the sixth-most chapters by the end of the five published novels of the series. She is not present in the fifth book A Dance with Dragons, but a preview chapter of her narration has been released from the upcoming sixth book The Winds of Winter.

=== A Game of Thrones ===
When King Robert Baratheon visits Winterfell to see Lord Eddard "Ned" Stark, Sansa is happily betrothed to Crown Prince Joffrey Baratheon, still believing Joffrey to be a gallant prince akin to those she had been told and read as a younger child. Sansa and her sister, Arya, then travel with their father to the capital, King's Landing, where Eddard will assume the role of Hand of the King. While Joffrey and Sansa walk through the woods before their journey, Joffrey notices Arya sparring with a local butcher's boy, Mycah, using wooden swords. He then begins to torment the boy with a real sword. A fight erupts, and Arya's direwolf, Nymeria, attacks Joffrey after he threatens to hurt Arya. Sansa lies to King Robert about what happened to protect Joffrey. Since Arya has driven off her wolf to save her, Sansa's wolf, Lady, is killed instead, causing a rift between the Stark sisters.

During the Tourney of the Hand held in King's Landing to honour her father, Lord Eddard, Sansa is enchanted by the knights performing in the event. At the request of his mother, Queen Cersei Lannister, Joffrey spends a portion of the tourney with Sansa; near the end of the tourney, he commands his guard, Sandor "the Hound" Clegane, to take her back to her quarters. Sandor explains that his older brother, Gregor, pushed his face into a brazier of hot coals for playing with one of Gregor's wooden toys when they were young, causing the disfiguring scars that cover half of his head.

After Eddard uncovers the truth about Joffrey's paternity—that the Baratheon children by Cersei were actually fathered by Cersei's twin brother, Jaime Lannister, via incest—he tells Sansa that he is sending her and Arya back to Winterfell. Sansa is devastated and wants to stay in King's Landing, so she runs to Queen Cersei to inform her of her father's plans, giving Cersei the information she needs to prevent her and Arya's departure. After Robert's death and Ned's arrest by Cersei's forces on charges of treason—based on Ned's argument that the Iron Throne should pass to Robert's elder surviving brother, Lord Stannis Baratheon, not Joffrey, based on the law of succession—Sansa begs Joffrey to show mercy to her father. Joffrey agrees to honour her request if Ned swears an oath of fealty to him. However, he still beheads Ned publicly, forcing Sansa to watch. Thereafter, Sansa essentially becomes a hostage in King's Landing and finally accepts Joffrey's true, sadistic nature when he makes her gaze at her father's tarred head.

=== A Clash of Kings ===
Sansa remains a hostage in King's Landing and has learned to be outwardly loyal to King Joffrey to avoid severe physical abuse. At the celebration for Joffrey's name day (i.e., birthday), she ostensibly saves the life of Ser Dontos Hollard when he shows up late and inebriated, begging Joffrey to spare him, in turn winning Dontos's loyalty. Joffrey's guards routinely beat Sansa. After her brother wins a battle against Joffrey's maternal family, House Lannister, she is publicly beaten in the throne room and has her clothes torn. Tyrion Lannister, the black sheep of the family owing to his dwarfism, intervenes on her behalf, and Sandor Clegane gives her his cloak to cover herself. Later, Sandor Clegane saves Sansa from a riot in King's Landing.

During the Battle of Blackwater Bay, all of the highborn ladies in King's Landing seek refuge within a doubly secure, moated chamber within the Red Keep. There, Queen Cersei talks about her own life experiences with Sansa, then flees to the throne room with her other son, Tommen Baratheon, when the tide of the battle turns. This leaves Sansa to stay to give comfort to the ladies before retreating to her own quarters. There she finds Sandor Clegane, who offers to take her away from any imminent danger and the Lannisters themselves, which Sansa declines. When Sansa awakens, the battle is over. House Lannister has won, but her betrothal to Joffrey is soon ended so that he may marry Margaery Tyrell, whose family just helped turn the tide of battle, in a more beneficial political marriage. However, Joffrey informs Sansa that he will still have use for her when married, and to "expect a nightly visitor for a long while".

=== A Storm of Swords ===
In the third book, Sansa is invited to dine with Margaery and her grandmother, Olenna Redwyne of the Arbor. The two women seek to learn the true nature of Joffrey Baratheon now that he and Margaery are betrothed. In turn, Olenna suggests that Sansa should marry her grandson, Willas Tyrell, who is disabled and significantly older than Sansa. Sansa reveals the marriage plan to Ser Dontos, who warns her about the Tyrells; however, Sansa develops a close friendship with Margaery and is excited to become part of her family. However, when Tywin Lannister, patriarch of House Lannister, learns of the marriage plot, he schemes to have Sansa's brother Robb Stark killed, knowing that would leave Sansa to inherit Winterfell and the North. He then commands his son Tyrion to marry Sansa. Tyrion initially opposes the marriage but is eventually persuaded by the idea of becoming Lord of Winterfell, so he agrees to marry her.

Sansa wakes one morning to the shock of being fitted for a wedding gown—she is to wed Tyrion that same day in a forced marriage. Joffrey taunts her and, having killed her father, Ned, takes on the ceremonial role of giving her away to the groom as another humiliating display of control. Sansa ignores Tyrion and refuses to bend as he attempts to put his cloak around her, a wedding ceremony custom in Westeros. In turn, Joffrey commands Ser Dontos to act as a stool so that Tyrion can cloak his bride despite his short stature. At the banquet, Sansa dances with many lords who offer words of comfort, while Joffrey merely threatens to rape her. Tyrion intervenes and states his desire to castrate Joffrey. After the wedding ceremony, Tyrion chooses not to consummate the marriage due to Sansa's lack of desire in him. It is not long before many in King's Landing come to know that the marriage was never consummated.

Not long after Sansa's marriage, Joffrey and Margaery are wed, and afterward there is a grand feast. At the wedding, Joffrey is poisoned. As Joffrey begins to choke to death, Cersei orders both Tyrion and Sansa arrested, but Sansa manages to flee in the chaos. Once in her room, she gathers her belongings and notices that one of the amethysts from her hairnet, a gift from Ser Dontos, is missing. Sansa immediately realizes that the prince had been poisoned and starts to doubt Ser Dontos's supposed rescue plan. Understanding that she will be implicated in the murder of Joffrey, she chooses to flee King's Landing with the knight anyway. Ser Dontos is later killed by Petyr "Littlefinger" Baelish, who reveals that he is the mastermind behind nearly all of the capital intrigue. He reveals that he was the one who sent Dontos to her and that Olenna took the amethyst from Sansa's hairnet.

Baelish smuggles Sansa to safety in the Vale of Arryn (a.k.a. "the Vale"), where she poses as his bastard daughter, Alayne Stone. She is taken to her maternal aunt, Lysa Arryn, head of House Arryn, now betrothed to Baelish. Lysa declares that Sansa must marry her sickly son, Robert Arryn, heir to the Vale. Petyr and Lysa are wed, but Lysa becomes jealous when she witnesses Baelish kissing her niece. Lysa later attempts to murder Sansa, but she is saved once again by Baelish, who kills Lysa.

=== A Feast for Crows ===
After Lysa's death, Sansa becomes mistress of the Eyrie and still pretends to be Baelish's illegitimate daughter, Alayne Stone. Baelish successfully pacifies the lords of the Vale, who suspected Baelish's hand in Lysa's death. Afterwards, Baelish reveals to Sansa his plans to eventually marry her to the heir to the Vale, Harrold Hardyng, and his long-term plans to reveal her true identity and reclaim the North. Sansa serves as a motherly figure to the young Robert Arryn, caring for him after Lysa's death. By now, she has lost much of her naivety and trust in Baelish.

=== The Winds of Winter ===
A preview chapter titled "Alayne", having been removed from the published version of A Dance with Dragons in June 2010, was released on George R. R. Martin's website in March 2015. In the chapter, Sansa (in the guise of Alayne Stone) meets Harrold Hardyng, the handsome but arrogant cousin and heir presumptive of Robert Arryn, before a tourney. She also bumps into Ser Shadrich "Mad Mouse" of the Shady Glen, a bankrupt hedge knight who was previously encountered by Brienne of Tarth seeking rewards for finding Sansa. During the tourney feast, Sansa catches the affection of and dances with several young knights, including Harrold.

=== Family tree of House Stark ===
Descendants of Rickard Stark

Rickard	Lyarra
Brandon	Catelyn; Tully	Eddard	Lyanna (Note: In season 7 of the TV series Game of Thrones, Jon is revealed to be the son of Rhaegar Targaryen and Lyanna.)	Benjen
Robb	Jeyne; Westerling	Sansa	Tyrion; Lannister	Arya	Brandon	Rickon	Jon; Snow

== Adaptations ==
=== Media ===
Sansa appears in several adaptations of A Song of Ice and Fire. She is a main character for eight seasons of the HBO television series, Game of Thrones (2011—2019), and the graphic novel series, A Game of Thrones (2011—2014). She has also appeared in the video game Reigns: Game of Thrones (2018) based on the television series interpretation of the character.

In the television series, Sansa is adapted by D.B. Weiss and David Benioff. She first appears in the series two years older than her book counterpart, and her storyline diverges significantly from the fifth season onwards. However, there are also numerous differences from the beginning of the series. Izzy Meikle-Small auditioned for the role, the two finalists for the role were Small and Sophie Turner with the latter winning, Small said she was sad that she lost the role due to the show being massive but also said she was happy that she didn't get cast as she felt her parents wouldn't have approved the "flesh" of the show.

=== Television storylines ===
==== Season 1 ====
Sansa is first seen with Arya at Winterfell, during their embroidery lesson with Septa Mordane. Following the arrival of Robert Baratheon and his escort at Winterfell, he insists to Ned that Joffrey and Sansa should be married in order to join their houses. Sansa, who is desperate to leave Winterfell, begs Catelyn to make Ned agree to the engagement.

Joffrey is bitten by Arya's direwolf Nymeria while bullying Mycah the butcher's boy and Arya. Sansa, an eyewitness, claims to be ignorant of the event at the inquest. As retribution for Joffrey's injury, Cersei convinces Robert to have Sansa's direwolf, Lady, killed in place of the now-missing Nymeria.

After arriving at King's Landing, Sansa attends the Hand's Tourney where Petyr "Littlefinger" Baelish tells Sansa and Arya the story behind Sandor "The Hound" Clegane's gruesome facial burns. As time passes, Sansa wears her hair like a southerner and is more flippant with Mordane, expressing fears she will fail to give Joffrey a male heir.

Following Ned's initial resignation as Hand of the King, Sansa is devastated to hear she must return to Winterfell. She likens Joffrey to a lion and says he is nothing like Robert Baratheon. This statement inspires Ned to investigate the Baratheon family line, prompting him to realise that Cersei's children are bastards fathered by her twin brother Jaime Lannister, not Robert Baratheon.

Following Robert's death and Ned's arrest for treason, all Stark servants in King's Landing are executed. Cersei exhorts Sansa to write Robb and Catelyn, imploring them to swear fealty to Joffrey. At court, Sansa pleads for her father's life; all agree on the condition Ned confesses his treason and swears fealty. Sansa is present at the Great Sept of Baelor and is horrified when Joffrey orders Ned's execution, fainting as Ned is beheaded.

Grieving the death of her father, Sansa is forced by Joffrey to look upon the spiked heads of both Ned and Septa Mordane. She begs to return home, but he informs Sansa that they are still to be married, and she will stay and obey. Joffrey promises to present Robb's head also, to which she retorts that Robb may give her Joffrey's head, instead. While on the catwalk, Sansa moves to push Joffrey to his death but is stopped by Sandor Clegane, who offers practical consoling advice.

==== Season 2 ====
As the War of the Five Kings progresses, Sansa's position in King's Landing becomes increasingly perilous. On Joffrey's name day celebration, Sansa saves an inebriated Ser Dontos Hollard from execution, by convincing Joffrey to instead make Dontos his fool. While at the celebration, Tyrion offers his condolences for Ned's death, in response to which Sansa insists her family are all traitors, and she is loyal to Joffrey. Later on, when her eldest brother Robb wins a battle against the Lannisters, Sansa is publicly beaten and humiliated in front of the court by Joffrey and Ser Meryn (on Joffrey's orders), as payment for her brother's crimes.

Tyrion Lannister enters the court and rescues Sansa. Despite being a dwarf, Tyrion takes pity on Sansa's situation and offers to have the engagement called off. Sansa maintains her facade that she is loyal to Joffrey, which impresses Tyrion to the point he believes Sansa might just survive King's Landing.

Tyrion has his lover, Shae, positioned as Sansa's handmaiden. Sansa and Shae form a friendship in which Sansa is able to vent about her hatred of the Lannisters without fear of being betrayed. Sansa is present when the royal family bids farewell to Joffrey's sister, Myrcella, on her departure to Dorne to form an alliance between the Lannisters and the Martells. While returning to the Red Keep, a riot breaks out in the streets of King's Landing, amidst which Sansa finds herself caught in the fray. Three peasant men chase Sansa and attempt to rape her before she is rescued and returned to the castle by Sandor Clegane.

The following morning, Sansa has a nightmare of the incident and wakes up in a bloodstained bed. Sansa has her first period, thus meaning she can now bear Joffrey's children. Sansa and Shae attempt to conceal this, which involves Shae's threatening to kill a witness handmaiden if she tells anyone. However, Sandor Clegane sees the blood, and both Cersei and Joffrey are informed.

Cersei invites Sansa to her chambers to share some of her wisdom and experience as a wife and a mother. Cersei reminisces that her husband Robert was not interested in her childbirth. Cersei explains to Sansa that while Sansa may never love Joffrey (and vice versa), she will love his children. Cersei warns Sansa that the more people she loves, the weaker she will be. Therefore, Sansa should only love her children, as it is the only love she has no choice in.

Before the Battle of the Blackwater, Joffrey forces Sansa to kiss the blade of his sword, while bragging he will kill Stannis himself. Sansa taunts Joffrey by remarking he must be battling in the vanguard, which he would not be. Joffrey promises that she will lick Stannis's blood, and later her brother Robb's blood off his sword. During the battle, Sansa takes refuge with Cersei, Shae, and the other women and children of King's Landing. A drunk Cersei declares to Sansa and the women that if the city falls, they will all be raped while the city is sacked. Cersei continues her taunting by also telling Sansa that tears are not the only weapons women have; the greatest weapon they own is between their legs. Following Cersei's departure from the refuge with Tommen, Sansa leaves to hide in her bedchamber, where she finds Sandor Clegane. Sandor, about to leave King's Landing, offers to take Sansa home. Sansa declines, insisting Stannis would not harm her. After the battle is won by the Lannister-Tyrell forces, Loras Tyrell asks Joffrey to take his sister, Margaery, as his bride. Joffrey accepts the proposal, which annuls his betrothal to Sansa. Sansa, while pretending to be devastated, is secretly delighted she no longer has to marry Joffrey. However, Petyr Baelish warns that while Sansa is no longer engaged, Joffrey would have greater rein to abuse Sansa, especially now she is a woman. Petyr assures Sansa he will help get her home, in which Sansa once again displays a facade, asserting King's Landing is her home. Petyr advises Sansa that everyone in King's Landing is a liar and that they are much more cunning than her.

==== Season 3 ====
With her engagement to Joffrey annulled, Sansa does not have to worry about spending the rest of her life with him, but is with lesser protection from tormentors. Petyr Baelish, an old friend of her mother's with a reputation for being sadistic and cunning, tells her that he can smuggle her out of the city, but she is reluctant. Sansa finds a friend in Loras Tyrell, who is kind to her and whom she hopes will ask for her hand. His sister, Joffrey's new fiancée, Margaery, is also kind to her and takes her to dine with her grandmother, Olenna Tyrell, who asks her for her opinion of Joffrey. Sansa reveals Joffrey's true, cruel personality, but Margaery and Lady Olenna merely pass it by as a trivial matter, saying there is nothing to be done to change a man's character, especially a king's. Sansa's affection for Loras grows; she is unaware that Loras is gay and, while he likes her and enjoys spending time with her, he can never love her. Margaery proposes the idea that Loras will marry Sansa, meaning Sansa can leave King's Landing, which delights Sansa. However, when this plan is reported to the Lannisters, they fear that the Tyrells will pose an even greater threat with a member of House Stark as one of their allies and quickly end the idea of the engagement, by betrothing Loras to Cersei and engaging Sansa to Tyrion, which both Sansa and Shae are against. However, the day of the wedding, Tyrion promises not to harm her and, as she prepares to consummate the marriage, Tyrion realizes how unhappy Sansa is and tells her that she doesn't have to consummate it unless she wants to. When Sansa asks Tyrion what would happen if she never wants him in her bed, he quips, "And so my watch begins."

Sansa and Tyrion do form a somewhat friendly relationship, as he is kind to her and treats her well, and she soon realizes there are worse Lannisters to be wed to. However, their cordial relationship suffers a crushing blow when Sansa receives news of Robb and Catelyn's deaths at the Red Wedding, an event orchestrated by Tywin Lannister, Tyrion's father.

==== Season 4 ====
Sansa, still distraught over the death of Robb and Catelyn, is approached by Dontos Hollard, a former knight whom Sansa had convinced Joffrey to make his fool instead of executing him. Dontos gives her a necklace, claiming it was his mother's. However, the necklace turns out to be a fake; one of the gems contains the poison which Lady Olenna Tyrell uses to poison Joffrey at his wedding to Margaery Tyrell. In the commotion, Sansa is taken by Dontos, to Baelish's boat in Blackwater Bay. Baelish smuggles Sansa from King's Landing after revealing the nature of the necklace and has Dontos killed with a crossbow.

Lord Baelish, with Sansa posing as his niece Alayne Stone, pass through the Blood Gates to the Eyrie and to the keep of Lysa Arryn. Lysa initially invites them with open arms, revealing she knows exactly who her niece is, and they are welcome to be housed. It is soon revealed however, Lysa mistrusts the relationship between Sansa and Baelish accusing Baelish of violating Sansa and accusing him of never loving her. Later in the keep, Sansa strikes Lysa's son Robin and Baelish appears. Baelish then proclaims his undying love for her deceased mother, Catelyn, and he shares a kiss with a stunned Sansa, with Lysa watching from above. Sansa is immediately summoned to Lysa's throne room, where she believes she had been summoned for striking her son. Lysa reveals she had observed the kiss, and though defending herself and Baelish's actions against her, Lysa holds her to the Moon Door, a trap door that leads hundreds of feet down into the mountains below. Baelish intervenes before she gets the chance to execute Sansa and pushes Lysa to her death instead as he proclaimed his love for her sister. Then Baelish later claimed to the lords of the Vale that she committed suicide. Sansa is called to give testimony, and although she reveals her true identity, she supports Baelish's story. She then joins Baelish and her cousin Robin Arryn on a tour of the Vale.

==== Season 5 ====
Baelish brokers a marriage between Sansa and Ramsay Bolton, now the heir to the North after the death of Robb Stark. Though Sansa is reluctant to marry Ramsay, as his father Roose had personally murdered Robb, Baelish persuades her by claiming that the marriage will give her the opportunity to avenge her family. On the way to Winterfell, they encounter Brienne of Tarth, who had sworn to Catelyn Stark to take Sansa to safety and tries to convince Sansa to come with her; Baelish has her chased off by his men, but Brienne follows Sansa to Winterfell regardless. Though initially charming, Ramsay's sadistic nature becomes apparent when Sansa discovers that he has captured and enslaved Ned's former ward Theon Greyjoy, and forced him to assume the identity of his serving man, Reek. Sansa and Ramsay wed in front of the Godswood. That night, Ramsay rapes Sansa, and forces Reek to watch. Over the next few days, Ramsay continues to rape and beat Sansa every night, and keeps her locked in her bedchamber. Sansa begs Reek to help her signal her northern allies by lighting a candle in the broken tower. Reek, wishing to spare Sansa from Bolton's wrath, instead tells Ramsay. He proceeds to flay the maid who had told Sansa of the signal, and forces Sansa to look at her corpse. Furious, Sansa confronts Reek, and goes so far to claim that he deserved to be tortured by Ramsay. Theon agrees but reveals that he had failed to capture Sansa's brothers Bran and Rickon, and killed two farm boys in their place. Theon's revelation causes Sansa's anger towards her former friend to cool down somewhat. While the Boltons prepare to battle Stannis Baratheon's advancing forces, Sansa signals to Brienne, unaware that she has left to kill Stannis. When help does not come, Sansa attempts to return to her room but is caught by Ramsay's paramour Myranda, who threatens to mutilate Sansa. Finally snapping, Theon throws Myranda to her death, just as the Bolton forces return. Fearful of Ramsay's reaction, Theon and Sansa jump from Winterfell's battlements into the snow.

==== Season 6 ====
Sansa and Theon are captured by Bolton soldiers in the forest outside Winterfell, but Brienne and her squire Podrick Payne arrive in time to rescue them and kill the Bolton soldiers. This time, Sansa accepts Brienne's loyalty. While Theon returns to the Iron Islands, Sansa, Brienne, and Podrick journey on to Castle Black, where she reunites with her half-brother Jon Snow, who has just resigned as Lord Commander of the Night's Watch. Sansa tries to persuade Jon to help her drive the Boltons out of Winterfell; although Jon initially refuses, he changes his mind after Ramsay sends a letter to Jon in which he gloats that he holds Rickon Stark captive and threatens to kill the Starks and the Wildlings Jon has let through the Wall if Sansa is not returned. Before Jon and Sansa leave Castle Black, Baelish arranges a meeting with Sansa in Mole's Town. He insists that he was unaware of Ramsay's nature and offers the support of the Knights of the Vale, also mentioning that her great-uncle Brynden "Blackfish" Tully has captured Riverrun from House Frey. Sansa sends Baelish away, declaring that she never wants to see him again, but sends Brienne to the Riverlands to convince the Blackfish to aid the Starks.

Although Jon and Sansa are only able to win over a handful of Northern lords, Jon insists that they must march on Winterfell, despite Sansa's objections. Sansa sends a letter to Baelish asking for his aid, and the Vale forces arrive at Winterfell in time to defeat the Boltons, though too late to save Rickon. Ramsay is captured and Sansa has him fed to his hounds. In the aftermath of the battle, Sansa apologizes for not telling Jon about Baelish and the Knights of the Vale. Jon forgives her and asks that they trust each other completely from now on. While in the godswood, Baelish tells Sansa the North will rally behind her and confesses his ambition to rule Westeros with Sansa at his side, but Sansa rebuffs his advances. Later, the Northmen and Valemen declare Jon the new King in the North.

==== Season 7 ====
Jon travels to Dragonstone to negotiate with Daenerys Targaryen for her support against the White Walkers, leaving Sansa as regent in his absence. Soon after, Bran and Arya return to Winterfell. Littlefinger seeks to drive a wedge between Sansa and Arya by letting Arya find Sansa's letter to Robb asking him to bend the knee to Joffrey, causing Arya to confront Sansa. Sansa sneaks into Arya's quarters and comes across the "faces" Arya has taken from the various people she has killed on her travels; Arya catches Sansa and tells Sansa of her ability to assume people's identities with the faces before she threatens her.

Sansa later receives an invitation to King's Landing, where Jon intends to present Cersei, who is now Queen of the Seven Kingdoms, with proof of the White Walkers' existence. Refusing to return to King's Landing, she sends Brienne as her representative.

Sansa shows Littlefinger the letter she received from Jon following the meeting in King's Landing, in which Jon states that he had pledged his support to Daenerys Targaryen. Littlefinger continues his manipulation of Sansa by claiming that Jon has betrayed the North, Sansa should seize power from Jon, and suggests Arya intends to murder her to become Lady of Winterfell. Sansa summons Arya to the great hall and begins an accusation of treason and murder, before directing the accusation towards Littlefinger. With help from their brother Bran (now known as Three-Eyed Raven), Sansa and Arya reveal that they are aware of Baelish's numerous crimes, including the murder of Lysa Arryn, orchestrating the murders of both Jon Arryn and Eddard Stark, and manipulating the Starks and Lannisters to war. Baelish tries to plead for his life, but Sansa refuses and sentences Littlefinger to death. Arya executes him. The Stark sisters later resolve their differences and acknowledge that the Starks must stand together to survive the winter. They remember their father telling them, "The lone wolf dies, but the pack survives."

==== Season 8 ====
Sansa welcomes Daenerys and her court, including Tyrion, to Winterfell. Tyrion declares that the Lannister troops will be marching north as well to defend against the dead, but Sansa is skeptical; her fears are confirmed when Jaime Lannister arrives in Winterfell and he reveals Cersei's treachery. Sansa wishes Jaime dead for attacking Ned in King's Landing, but spares him when Brienne vouches for him. Sansa suspects that Jon's decision to pledge to Daenerys as queen is due to his love for Daenerys. Sansa is wary of Daenerys but when speaking with her in private, Daenerys assures Sansa that her love for Jon is also genuine and they reach common ground. However, the situation becomes tense when Sansa asks of the North's independence after Daenerys has conquered Westeros. They are interrupted by Theon's arrival, who has come to help defend Winterfell.

Sansa watches the battle against the dead from Winterfell's battlements, but when the Dothraki are easily overrun, Arya orders Sansa to seek refuge in the crypts with the other non-combatants. The Night King reanimates the dead around Winterfell, including the Starks buried in the crypts, but the undead fall when Arya kills the Night King, allowing Sansa, Tyrion, and the others in the crypts to survive. Sansa is present for the funeral for those fallen in battle, including Theon, who was killed defending Bran. She places a Stark pin in Theon's armor before he is cremated to honor him as an ally of the Starks.

Sansa is reunited with the Hound at the victory feast. The Hound declares that Sansa would not have experienced the horrors she faced had she fled King's Landing with him, but Sansa acknowledges that her experiences made her wiser. At the war council, Sansa and Daenerys disagree over giving the Northern army time to recover before marching on King's Landing. After the council, Sansa and Arya tell Jon they don't trust Daenerys but Jon defends Daenerys. Jon confides he is the son of Rhaegar Targaryen and Lyanna Stark after swearing Sansa and Arya to secrecy. Sansa reveals this to Tyrion.

Daenerys takes King's Landing, but lays waste to the surrendered populace during which Cersei is also killed. Jon tries but fails to dissuade Daenerys from further destruction and ultimately assassinates her. When Jon is arrested by the Unsullied, Sansa camps the Northern army outside the city and travels to King's Landing to convene a council to determine the fates of Jon, Tyrion, and Westeros. Tyrion suggests Bran be crowned king, to near-unanimous approval. Arya and Sansa abstain, and Sansa asserts to Bran that the North has sacrificed too much to remain part of the Seven Kingdoms, declaring the North's independence. Sansa, Arya, and Bran bid farewell to Jon, who is exiled. Sansa returns to Winterfell and is crowned Queen in the North.

== Reception ==
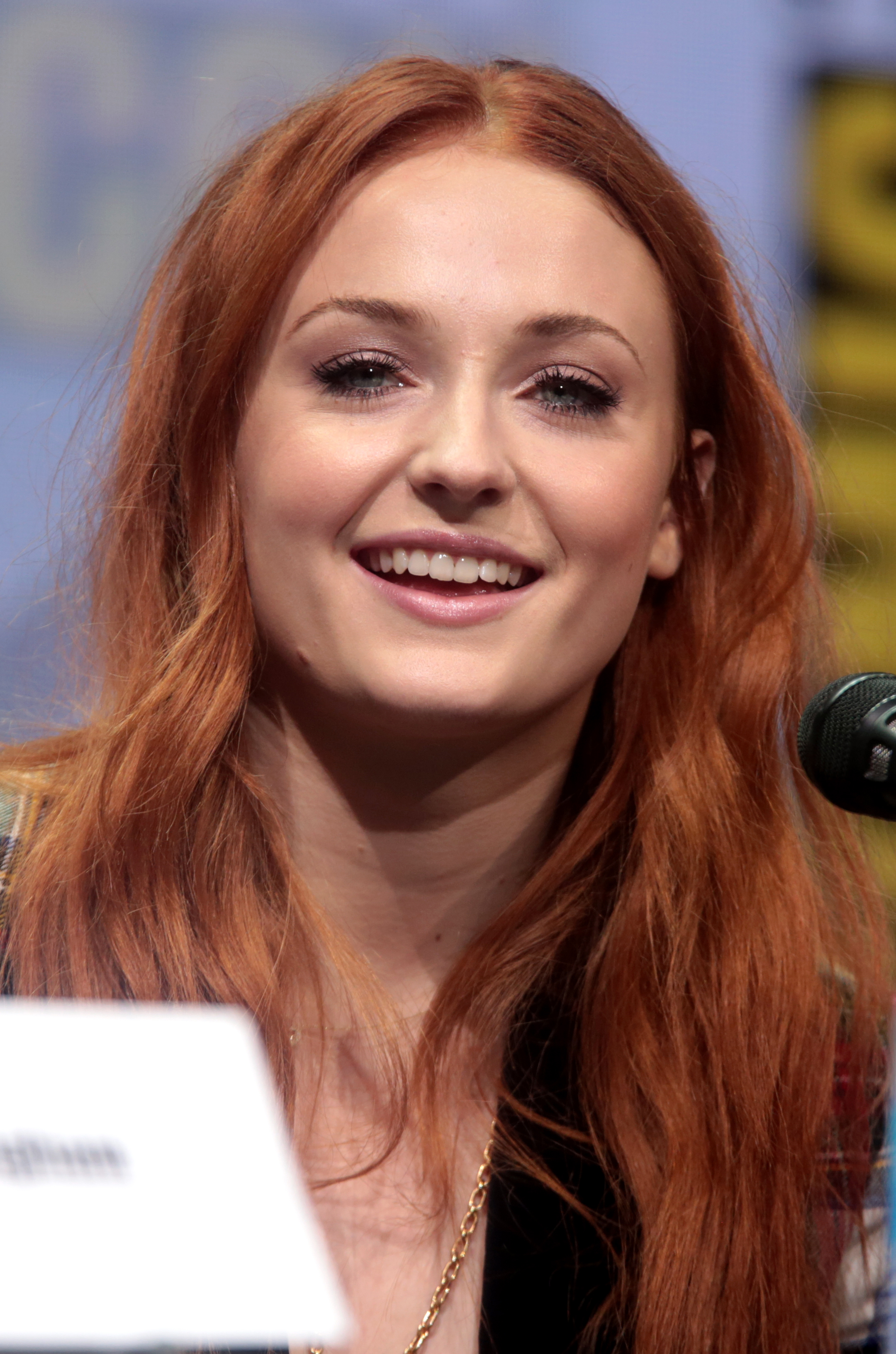
Sophie Turner plays the role of Sansa Stark in the television series

As her storyline has progressed, Sansa has received critical scrutiny and praise for the development of her character and her emergence from a naive girl to a strong young woman. Rolling Stone ranked Sansa as No. 4 on a list of the "Top 40 Game of Thrones Characters", saying that Sansa is "often overlooked in favor of her killer kid sister", but that her "quiet, innate political shrewedness and emotional strength have enabled her to survive", and calling her "the show's best-kept secret". In The Wrap's ranking of the 48 best Game of Thrones main characters in the first five seasons, Sansa was ranked at No. 4, ahead of the more popular Daenerys Targaryen, Jon Snow, and Tyrion Lannister, stating that "Sansa has been kind of great in Season 6, turning into the sort of badass we always hoped but never thought she actually could become".

Writing for Mic, Julianne Ross said that Sansa is "often cited as one of the most reviled characters on Game of Thrones", and "not coincidentally, she is also one of the most classically feminine characters on the show." Ross criticized the heavy hatred for Sansa, particularly in contrast to her sister Arya, opining that this is because "she doesn't fit the narrow 'strong female character' mold we're used to rooting for." In an MTV article, Crystal Bell regarded Sansa as the most relatable character in the series. "She's often despised for having no agency", Bell wrote, but she is hated for her passivity as a woman as it "denotes weakness" and "she is the epitome of femininity" in the series. Bell felt that Sansa's greatest strength is her "unwavering resilience".

Sansa received acclaim in Season 6 of the show, during which she began her quest to retake her family home and exact revenge on those who wronged her. Megan Garber of The Atlantic praised the show's decision to have Sansa be the one orchestrating Ramsay's death in "Battle of the Bastards", saying that "in the end, it was Sansa making the decisions about who would be the victim." Bennett Madison of Vanity Fair wrote: "As far back as King's Landing, Sansa's been quietly protecting herself ... learning how to game the system, and slithering through situations that would have gotten the best of the show's more flashy or impulsive characters." In "Battle of the Bastards", she was "defiantly, gloriously correct in her convictions" and "saved the day with her foresight and savvy".

In an interview with The New York Times, actress Sophie Turner said that "[Sansa is] no longer a pawn in anyone's game; she's no longer a prisoner...she's the one taking charge and doing her own thing, which is very exciting". Turner later told Time magazine about how gratifying it was to watch Sansa's development during Season 6 and defended the show on the criticism of its cruel treatment of women: "In my opinion, Game of Thrones is not sexist, and it's accurate to medieval time. The show puts social boundaries on the women, and they break out of these boundaries."

An academic article by Amanda DiGioia, published by the University of Oxford's St Antony's International Review, argues that Game of Thrones ultimately resolves its central power struggle in favour of leadership styles coded as feminine, rather than militarised, masculine authority. Focusing on Sansa Stark’s coronation as Queen in the North, it contrasts her collaborative, strategic, and policy-driven approach with the failures of rulers such as Daenerys Targaryen and Cersei Lannister, whose reliance on force leads to their downfall. The article further connects this fictional outcome to contemporary politics, particularly the leadership of Finnish Prime Minister Sanna Marin, suggesting that collaborative and care-oriented governance offers a viable alternative to strongman politics without claiming that female leadership alone dismantles patriarchy.

=== Controversy ===
In the episode "Unbowed, Unbent, Unbroken", Sansa's rape at Ramsay's hands was one of many subjects of controversy for the show's deviations from the books. The majority of professional criticism concerned the showrunners' decision to have Ramsay rape Sansa, with most critics describing the scene as gratuitous and artistically unnecessary. "This grim scene was difficult for the show to justify," said Charlotte Runcie of The Daily Telegraph. Joanna Robinson of Vanity Fair added, "this rape scene undercuts all the agency that’s been growing in Sansa since the end of last season. [...] I’d never advocate that Game of Thrones (or any work of fiction) shy away from edgy plots out of fear of pushback or controversy. But edgy plots should always accomplish something above pure titillation or shock value and what, exactly, was accomplished here?" Christopher Orr wrote in The Atlantic, "I continue to be astonished that showrunners Benioff and Weiss still apparently believe that their tendency to ramp up the sex, violence, and—especially—sexual violence of George R.R. Martin’s source material is a strength rather than the defining weakness of their adaptation." Myles McNutt of The A.V. Club wrote, "The issue with the show returning to rape as a trope is not simply because there have been thinkpieces speaking out against it, and is not solely driven by the rational concerns lying at the heart of those thinkpieces. It’s also that the show has lost my faith as a viewer." Writers from Vanity Fair, The Mary Sue and The Daily Beast all disapproved of the decision to use Sansa's victimization as a motivating agent for Theon, saying that the scene undermined Sansa's character development: "Was it really important to make that scene about Theon's pain?" wrote Joanna Robinson of Vanity Fair.

Other critics responded positively to the scene. Sean T. Collins of Rolling Stone wrote: "[B]y involving a multidimensional main character instead of one introduced primarily to suffer, the series has a chance to grant this story the gravity and seriousness it deserves. Sarah Hughes of The Guardian wrote: "I have repeatedly made clear that I’m not a fan of rape as a plot device—but the story of Ramsay and Sansa’s wedding was more than that. [...] The writers are walking a very fine line here. They handled it well tonight, telling a gothic tale of innocence sacrificed". Alyssa Rosenberg of The Washington Post wrote that the scene "managed to maintain a fine balance, employing a dignity and care for the experiences of victims that Game of Thrones has not always demonstrated."

Some critics questioned why this scene in particular should generate outrage when similar scenes have not. Sara Stewart of the New York Post pointed out that the rape and sexual abuse of both female and male characters is typical for Game of Thrones: "Why are we suddenly so outraged about the rape of Sansa Stark, when this show has served up a steady diet of sexual assault and violence against women since its first season began?" Cathy Young of Reason magazine, writing in Time noted what she calls a lack of complaint in response to the sexual mistreatment of male characters in earlier seasons, specifically the literal emasculation of Theon Greyjoy and the sexual assault of Gendry.

Robinson wrote in Vanity Fair, "if we can say one positive thing about that scene it's that Allen nailed his performance. Theon's horror mirrored our own and the camera—focusing on his reaction—let our minds fill in the blanks." Turner defended the scene as an artistic challenge for herself as an actor, saying, "When I read that scene, I kinda loved it. I love the way Ramsay had Theon watching. It was all so messed up. It's also so daunting for me to do it .. [it is] so emotional for her."

Some viewers, including U.S. Senator Claire McCaskill, announced that they would stop watching the show because of this scene. According to Business Insider, this scene and increased use of streaming services are likely reasons why ratings dropped from 6.2 million viewers for this episode to 5.4 million for the next episode, "The Gift."

=== Recognition and awards ===
Sophie Turner has received several award nominations for her portrayal of Sansa including an Emmy nomination for Outstanding Supporting Actress in a Drama Series in 2019. For her performance in the series she earned the Glamour Award for Best UK TV Actress in 2016 and 2017, and an EWwy Award for Best Supporting Actress in a Drama Series in 2016. Other nominations include the Young Artist Award for Best Performance in a TV Series by a Supporting Young Actress in 2012, and the EWwy Award for Best Supporting Actress in a Drama Series in 2015.
