= Catelyn Stark =

- A Song of Ice and Fire character Game of Thrones character
- Michelle Fairley as Catelyn Stark in Game of Thrones
- First appearance: Literature: A Game of Thrones (1996); Television: "Winter Is Coming" (2011)
- Last appearance: Television: "Blood of My Blood" (2016)
- Created by: George R. R. Martin
- Adapted by: D. B. Weiss & David Benioff (Game of Thrones)
- Portrayed by: Michelle Fairley

In-universe information
- Aliases: Cat; Stoneheart; Lady Stoneheart; The Silent Sister; Mother Merciless; The Hangwoman
- Gender: Female
- Title(s): Lady of Winterfell; Dowager Lady of Winterfell
- Family: House Tully; House Stark
- Spouse: Eddard Stark
- Children: Robb Stark; Sansa Stark; Arya Stark; Brandon Stark; Rickon Stark
- Relatives: Hoster Tully (father); Minisa Whent (mother); Lysa Tully (sister); Edmure Tully (brother); Roslin Frey (sister-in-law); Jon Arryn (brother-in-law); Robert Arryn (nephew); Unborn niece or nephew; Brynden Tully (paternal uncle)

Catelyn Stark (née Tully), later known as Lady Stoneheart, is a fictional character in the A Song of Ice and Fire series of fantasy novels by American author George R. R. Martin and its television adaptation Game of Thrones. She is a prominent point of view character in the first three novels. She also appears in the fourth novel, A Feast for Crows (2005), and will return in a prominent role for the forthcoming sixth novel, The Winds of Winter.

Catelyn is portrayed by Northern Irish actress Michelle Fairley on the HBO series Game of Thrones. Fairley's portrayal has garnered critical acclaim, with many praising her performance during the episode "The Rains of Castamere". Due to this popularity, many fans were disappointed she did not appear again in the series despite the character's resurrection in the novels. Author George R. R. Martin confirmed he argued against the decision, which he called "the first major diversion of the show from the books", and the character being cut was ultimately made by the television showrunners David Benioff and D. B. Weiss.

== Character description ==
=== Background ===
Catelyn was initially betrothed to Eddard Stark's older brother, Brandon, the heir to Winterfell at the time. When Brandon was sadistically executed by "Mad King" Aerys II Targaryen, Lord Jon Arryn, the guardian of Eddard, and Robert Baratheon rebelled against House Targaryen. Soon after the rebels won the Battle of the Bells, Catelyn married Eddard, having never met her new groom before the wedding day, to consolidate the alliance between the Riverlands and the North. She was initially disappointed, as Eddard was shorter and perceived to be less handsome than his brother Brandon. Still, she fell in love with him after seeing the "good sweet heart beneath his solemn face."

=== As Catelyn ===
Catelyn Stark is described as beautiful, with fair skin, long auburn hair, blue eyes, long fingers, high cheekbones, and full breasts, and dressed simply in the grey color of House Stark or the blue and red of her father's House Tully. She is proud, strong, kind, and generous, has a firm grasp of politics, and is often guided by a desire to protect her children. Catelyn is usually in accord with her husband Eddard, but resents his admission of his extramarital son, Jon Snow, into their household.

=== As Lady Stoneheart ===
Having decomposed in the river for several days, half of Catelyn's auburn hair had fallen out, and what remained was completely grey. Due to her throat being cut, her ability to speak is greatly impaired. From clawing at her face after Robb's murder, Stoneheart also has deep, gashing flesh wounds. She is a hooded woman and has been mistaken for Beric Dondarrion's lover.

Stoneheart has been described as having "nothing of Catelyn's mercy or kindness". Her objective as leader of the Brotherhood Without Banners is to slaughter anyone associated with the Red Wedding. This includes anyone with the Freys, Boltons, or Lannisters. She has been dubbed an "antagonist" or a "villain", especially an antagonist to Brienne of Tarth. She cannot speak properly because her throat has been slashed, earning her the nickname "the Silent Sister." To give commands verbally, she has to cover her throat wound with her hand. She is also known as "The Hangwoman" or "Mother Merciless."

== Storylines ==
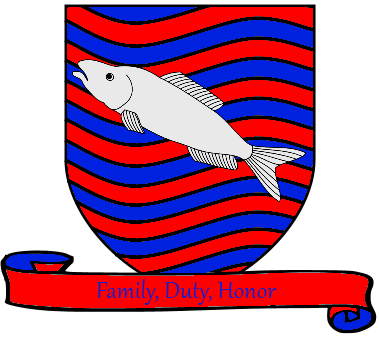
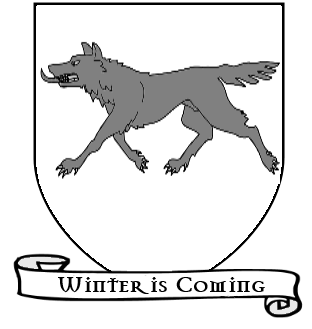
Coat of arms of House Tully and House Stark

=== Book series ===
==== A Game of Thrones ====
After the royal party arrives at Winterfell, Catelyn receives a letter from her sister, Lysa Arryn, stating that the Lannisters had killed her husband, Jon Arryn, King Robert Baratheon's "Hand" (i.e., second-in-command). Robert persuades Ned Stark, Catelyn's husband, to take his place. When her son Bran is grievously injured and falls into a coma, she sits by his bed until the two are attacked by a would-be assassin who has come to kill Bran. Catelyn is wounded in the attack and travels to King's Landing to warn Eddard after recovering. There, her childhood companion Petyr Baelish tells her that the dagger used in the attack belongs to Tyrion Lannister. On her way back to Winterfell, she takes Tyrion to her sister at the Eyrie for trial, where Tyrion escapes execution by demanding and winning a trial by combat. After news of Eddard's execution by order of King Joffrey Baratheon, Robert's supposed son, reaches Catelyn, she argues for peace but is overruled by the newly crowned King Robb Stark of the North and his bannermen.

==== A Clash of Kings ====
Catelyn advises against Robb's plan to send Eddard's former ward, Theon Greyjoy, to forge an alliance with Balon Greyjoy. Robb sends Catelyn to attempt an alliance with Renly Baratheon and his massive host from the Reach and the Stormlands. Catelyn meets Renly at Bitterbridge and follows his host to the ancestral Baratheon seat of Storm's End, where she first witnesses the unsuccessful parley between Renly and his older brother and rival Iron Throne claimant, Stannis Baratheon, and then Renly's subsequent murder later that night by a shadow creature. Afterward, Catelyn flees with Brienne of Tarth, one of Renly's Kingsguard, to Riverrun. Upon hearing of her younger sons' supposed murder at the hands of Theon Greyjoy, Catelyn goes to confront the captive Jaime Lannister. Although the second novel ends her storyline ambiguously, it is revealed at the beginning of the third novel that Catelyn set him free and asked Brienne to escort him to King's Landing in an attempt to exchange him for her daughters, who were still captives of Joffrey. This, however, causes problems for Robb and costs him an ally, House Karstark, which had held grudges against the Lannisters.

==== A Storm of Swords ====
Catelyn's brother, Edmure Tully, places Catelyn under house arrest at Riverrun, but Robb pardons her after he announces his wedding to Jeyne Westerling, invalidating his marriage proposal to House Frey. Lord Walder Frey agrees to forgive Robb if Edmure marries his daughter Roslin, and Catelyn travels to the Frey seat of the Twins to attend the wedding with Robb and other Northern lords. However, Walder Frey and his men take revenge on Robb for his slight toward their house by slaughtering the Northern host, an act of treachery that became known as the "Red Wedding". In an attempt to save her son's life, Catelyn takes Aegon Frey hostage and kills him when Roose Bolton kills Robb regardless, but she still has her throat slashed by Raymund Frey. The Freys then mutilate Robb's corpse and throw Catelyn's stripped, naked corpse into the Green Fork in mockery of House Tully's tradition of river burial.

Three days later, Catelyn's body is washed ashore downstream along with hundreds of other corpses, and a wolf pack led by Arya Stark's stray direwolf, Nymeria, is drawn to scavenge upon the dead. However, Arya, skinchanging into Nymeria during her sleep, recognizes her mother's body, controls Nymeria to pull it out of the river, and guards it against other wolves until the outlaw Brotherhood Without Banners passes by and repels the wolves. Catelyn is then resurrected by Lord Beric Dondarrion, who sacrifices his life-force to revive her in repayment for her husband Eddard's honor. However, the time she spent deceased has caused Catelyn's body to partially decay, disfiguring her appearance; furthermore, upon her reanimation, she loses most of her previous kind personality, except for her hatred of the Lannisters and the Freys. Catelyn then assumes command of the Brotherhood and changes their aim to terrorizing anyone related to House Frey and Lannister. Her uncompromising brutality earns her the moniker "Lady Stoneheart". Under her leadership, the Brotherhood captures one of Walder Frey's great-grandsons, Petyr Frey, demanding a ransom. When a son of Walder Frey, Merrett Frey, delivers the ransom, he finds that Petyr has already been hanged, and after he is interrogated, he is hanged himself.

==== A Feast for Crows ====
Lady Stoneheart has employed Tom of Sevenstreams to be her spy-informant during the siege of Riverrun, where the Frey forces are commanded by Walder Frey's grandson and heir, Ryman Frey. Stoneheart's informant, Tom, is a musician hired by Ryman himself. Tom jokes that he will make a song called "Talking to the Fish" about Lord Emmon Frey's speech to the people of Riverrun.

Inside a tent, Ryman entertains his prostitute, and Ser Jaime Lannister notices Ryman has Robb's bronze crown. Jaime orders the crown to stay behind after dismissing Ryman for disobedience, and Tom provides an alibi for remaining. Off-page, Tom returns the crown to Lady Stoneheart. Jaime learns that the Brotherhood hanged Ryman and his companions Without Banners.

Stoneheart and the Brotherhood come across a small party led by Brienne, who informs Stoneheart that she is searching for Sansa at Jaime Lannister's request. Brienne notices that Stoneheart has retrieved her son's bronze crown and, upon inspecting it, sheds a tear beneath her hood. Brienne is named a traitor by Stoneheart because she carries Oathkeeper, a Lannister sword that was forged from Ned Stark's Valyrian steel blade, Ice. Brienne swears that she is still faithful, but Stoneheart insists she must prove it by killing Jaime, whom she believes played a role in the Red Wedding (since Roose Bolton's final words to Robb were "Jaime Lannister sends his regards"). Stoneheart gives her the ultimatum: sword or noose. Brienne refuses, even when threatened with a hanging. Just before Brienne is to be hanged, she sees the young squire-child Podrick Payne choking, along with Hyle Hill, and "shout[s] out a word" to intervene.

==== A Dance with Dragons ====
Stoneheart is revealed to have spared Brienne, with the word shouted by Brienne evidently being "sword". Brienne locates Jaime at a camp in Pennytree during the siege of Raventree, claiming she has found Sansa with Sandor Clegane, who are both a day's ride away. The Maid of Tarth warns Jaime that if he does not come alone, Catelyn's daughter will die. Jaime agrees and leaves. Later, Jaime is reported to have disappeared for weeks, a sign he has been successfully lured into Stoneheart's trap.

==== The World of Ice and Fire ====
The book states Tom O'Sevens informed the Brotherhood of Jaime's dismissal of Ryman, allowing the outlaws to ambush and hang Ryman near Fairmarket. However, from Brienne's point of view in the fourth book, Tom states that "our lady" (Stoneheart) had already gone to Fairmarket because she "never sleeps". This suggests Lady Stoneheart killed Ryman herself, and now sources differ (as The World of Ice and Fire is also written from an in-world maester).

==== The Winds of Winter ====
In a 2018 interview with the Chinese Esquire, author George R. R. Martin confirmed that Lady Stoneheart will reappear and have a prominent role in the forthcoming novel. He stated: "In the sixth book, I still continue to write her. She is an important part of the entire book."

=== Family tree of House Tully ===
Family tree of House Tully

Hoster	Minisa; Whent	Brynden "The Blackfish"
3 sons	Catelyn	Eddard; Stark	Petyr; Baelish	Lysa	Jon; Arryn	Edmure	Roslin; Frey
Robb; Stark	Sansa; Stark	Arya; Stark	Brandon; Stark	Rickon; Stark	Robert; Arryn

=== Television series ===
In January 2007, HBO secured the rights to adapt Martin's series for television. Jennifer Ehle was originally cast as Catelyn Stark and filmed her scenes in the unaired pilot until she eventually left for family reasons. Michelle Fairley was then cast in the role, which she played for three seasons. Australian actress Essie Davis, who later portrayed Lady Crane in the sixth season, also auditioned for the role when the series was being developed.

==== Season 1 ====
Catelyn's storyline is abbreviated and differs slightly in the first season. Introduced in the pilot, "Winter is Coming", Catelyn does not encourage Ned to journey south. Unlike her book counterpart, she is worried about the consequences due to the fates of his father, Rickard (Wayne Foskett), and older brother, Brandon (unseen), when they rode south on the command of Mad King Aerys II Targaryen (David Rintoul). She also does not seem as ready to promote Sansa as a suitable match for queen consort to Robert's supposed son and heir, Joffrey Baratheon (Jack Gleeson).

The first season also excludes Catelyn's extended family from A Game of Thrones (1996), with the exception of Lysa Arryn (Kate Dickie) and Catelyn's nephew, Robin (renamed from the novels; portrayed by Lino Facioli). Catelyn's suspicion towards the Lannisters is motivated by a shred of blonde hair found where Bran fell from the tower, indicating the Lannisters' involvement (rather than Jaime refusing to join the hunt the next day). Additionally, Catelyn confronts Jaime Lannister (Nikolaj Coster-Waldau) for throwing Bran from the tower by the end of the first season. Meanwhile, in the novels, Catelyn gradually develops this belief over time in the first two books, before Jaime confesses it while drunk at the end of the second novel.

Another difference is Catelyn's journeys. Her journey from passing the Bloody Gate to meet Blackfish to later ascending the Gates of the Moon and meeting King Robert's bastard daughter, Mya Stone (who is also excluded from the television series), is unseen.

==== Season 2 ====
In the second season, some of Catelyn's political decisions and discoveries are given to other characters. Her son Robb (Richard Madden) commands Ser Rodrik Cassel (Ron Donachie) to go to Winterfell to serve as castellan. This is a change from the novels, where Catelyn gave the order in the first book, following his injuries at the Vale, a change that was also removed from the television series. Catelyn's realization of Stannis's role in Renly's killing is given to Brienne of Tarth (Gwendoline Christie), who is also aged upward for the television series.

A major difference is Catelyn's motivation for freeing Jaime Lannister from the book to the screen. This event occurs during the episode "A Man Without Honor". In the second novel, A Clash of Kings, Robb and Catelyn are informed that Bran and Rickon died, and Catelyn frees Jaime out of motherly grief for her still-living hostage daughters.

In the television series, however, Bran and Rickon's fates are left unknown; it is later believed the boys died by "Dark Wings, Dark Words", the second episode of the third season, long after Catelyn frees Jaime. Instead, in the television series, Rickard Karstark (John Stahl) wants to kill Jaime out of revenge for his second-born son Torrhen's death, and Catelyn sneaks Jaime out in the night to prevent a valuable hostage from dying. She reserves this information from Robb to maintain the Karstark alliance with the Northern crown. As a result, Robb fulfills Edmure's role in keeping Catelyn under house arrest until the war ends.

There is a difference in Catelyn's locations. She is at Riverrun to receive Ned's bones from the Silent Sisters. In contrast, Petyr Baelish (Aidan Gillen) delivers them to the Stormlands shortly after her envoy mission to negotiate with the feuding Baratheon king–brothers, Renly and Stannis (Stephen Dillane). Similarly, she reunites with Robb while he is in the Westerlands to "accept the surrender" of the Crag, and she meets his future wife, Talisa Maegyr of Volantis (Oona Chaplin), rather than discovering Robb's marriage later (to a different character in the novels).

==== Season 3 ====
The episode "Dark Wings, Dark Words" depicts Robb and Catelyn receiving seemingly definitive proof that Bran and Rickon are dead. The timeline, which occurs long after Jaime is released in the television series, is a major difference from the motivations that led Robb to marry his wife and Catelyn to free Jaime. The third season also introduces Catelyn's other family members, Edmure (portrayed by Tobias Menzies) and the Blackfish (portrayed by Clive Russell), who appeared in the first two novels but were missing from the show's first two seasons.

A major difference includes Catelyn's feelings towards Jon Snow (portrayed by Kit Harington) prior to her death. In the third novel, A Storm of Swords, Catelyn objects to her son King Robb's intention to legitimize Jon and name him heir. She raises the point that Robb trusting Jon is not enough, stating that children or grandchildren may rise against Robb's own children or grandchildren, and remarks on the history of the Blackfyre rebellion against the Targaryen crown.

However, in the show, Catelyn blames her lack of maternal love for Jon on her family's tragedies and downfall. The television series reduces Catelyn's fears of Jon to pure jealousy for his mother, rather than the more complex reasoning in the novels, which is an attempt to maintain future dynastic peace.

During the television adaptation of the Red Wedding, Catelyn kills Joyeuse Erenford (Kelly Long), the wife of Walder (David Bradley). This is a change from the novels, in which she kills Walder Frey's dimwitted grandson Jinglebell, whom she mistakes for a son, in exchange for "a son for a son". After Robb dies in the television series, Catelyn becomes catatonic, and the Freys seemingly have no intention of keeping her alive, with one of them slashing her throat. In the novels, it is Catelyn's face-clawing and laughter that point towards her insanity, which leads to whispers suggesting a mercy killing before she is finally killed.

==== Season 4 ====
In the fourth season's opener, "Two Swords", Sansa (Sophie Turner) mentions Catelyn's body was thrown in the river. This is identical to the novels, as both mock Tully funeral customs. However, the aftermath is drastically different from the book to the screen. Following the fourth-season finale, "The Children", many fans expressed disappointment that Catelyn's resurrection as Lady Stoneheart was not included. In the novels, Arya's direwolf, Nymeria, retrieves her corpse from the Green Fork and runs away when humans approach. It is later revealed that the Brotherhood Without Banners found her corpse, and Beric Dondarrion, a six-times-resurrected man, gives her the kiss of life, passing on his power to her.

On the idea of portraying Stoneheart, Fairley joked in a 2013 interview: "I'm completely insane, so it mightn't be too much of an acting stretch!" She elaborated further on the possibility, stating:

For an actor to play something like that, I think visually it would be incredible. How do you portray evil, vengeance, lust for revenge? What does that do physically to a human being? What do they end up looking like? How do they attain it? The embodiment of that is something that would be incredibly exciting. Even evil people are justified. If you're playing a character like that, you have to find a way of liking them.

Neither showrunner explained the absence, but director Alex Graves explained in 2014 that they were "not sure" what to "do about it" during production of the previous third season, released in 2013. Then, he revealed there were no plans for the fourth season, if ever. He also admitted that he was unsure of her purpose, while admitting he had not read the novels:

From what I know of the books, it’s like, Okay, what’s she really there for? Because I think she goes around — and it’s vague to me because I haven’t had to direct it, so I haven’t looked at this in detail — but essentially she’s a reaction to the Red Wedding.

Showrunners David Benioff and D. B. Weiss claimed they had purposely left her out to avoid spoiling The Winds of Winter and to minimize resurrections in the series, despite arguments to keep her therein from author George R. R. Martin.

==== Season 5 ====
In the episode "Hardhome", the television-adapted version of Arya does not choose the name Cat-of-the-Canals, a secret tribute to her mother, when she poses as an orphan selling oysters. Instead, "Lana" is the name chosen.

==== Season 6 ====
In the episode "No One", Beric Dondarrion (Richard Dormer) is re-introduced following his last appearance in the third season. Being evidently still alive, Beric's appearance negated much of the remaining fan speculation of a potential, delayed entrance for Lady Stoneheart. Actor Jóhannes Haukur Jóhannesson was also cast as Lem for the episode, an ode to one of Stoneheart's henchmen, Lem Lemoncloak from the novels, and was quickly killed off. Following demand from fans of the novels, the actor agreed to videotape the monologue from the epilogue of A Storm of Swords, in which he delivers the speech of Merrett Frey's execution by the command of his leader, Lady Stoneheart.

=== Reception ===
Fairley's performance has received critical acclaim. The closing scene of "Cripples, Bastards, and Broken Things" was praised by HitFix's Alan Sepinwall, highlighting her as Catelyn gathers allies to arrest Tyrion. Time wrote about "The Rains of Castamere": "Michelle Fairley’s fantastic performance captures the horror, with the edge of desperation, anguish, and madness of a woman who has lost her sons (she believes all of them), lost her grandchild, may have lost her daughters, and for all she knows, is witnessing the extinction of the house she belongs to."
