= Game of Thrones season 1 =

Game of Thrones
- Season 1
- Region 1 DVD artwork featuring Eddard Stark sitting on the Iron Throne
- Showrunners: David Benioff; D. B. Weiss
- Starring: Sean Bean; Mark Addy; Nikolaj Coster-Waldau; Michelle Fairley; Lena Headey; Emilia Clarke; Iain Glen; Harry Lloyd; Kit Harington; Sophie Turner; Maisie Williams; Richard Madden; Alfie Allen; Isaac Hempstead Wright; Jack Gleeson; Rory McCann; Peter Dinklage; Aidan Gillen; Jason Momoa
- No. of episodes: 10

Release
- Original network: HBO
- Original release: April 17 – June 19, 2011

Season chronology
- Next → Season 2

The first season of the fantasy drama television series Game of Thrones premiered on HBO on April 17, 2011, in the United States and concluded on June 19, 2011. It consists of ten episodes of approximately 55 minutes each. The series is based on A Game of Thrones, the first novel in the A Song of Ice and Fire series by George R. R. Martin, adapted for television by David Benioff and D. B. Weiss. HBO had ordered a television pilot in November 2008; filming began the following year. However, it did not receive a season order and was later reworked with some roles recast. In March 2010, HBO ordered the first season, which began filming in July 2010, primarily in Belfast, Northern Ireland, and Malta.

The story takes place in a fantasy world, primarily upon the continent Westeros, with one storyline occurring on another continent to the east, Essos. Like the novel, the season initially focuses on the family of nobleman Eddard "Ned" Stark, the Warden of the North, who is asked to become the King's Hand (chief advisor) to his longtime friend, King Robert Baratheon. Investigating who murdered his predecessor, Jon Arryn, Ned uncovers dark secrets that Arryn tried to expose about the powerful Lannister family, which includes Robert's queen, Cersei. Once Robert dies, Cersei's tyrannical teenage son, King Joffrey Baratheon, orders Ned's arrest for treason and subsequent execution, prompting Ned's eldest son, Robb, to begin a rebellion against the Lannisters. Meanwhile, in Essos, the exiled Viserys Targaryen, son of the former king, forces his sister Daenerys to marry a Dothraki warlord in exchange for an army to pursue his claim to the Iron Throne. The season ends with Viserys dead and Daenerys becoming the Mother of Dragons.

Game of Thrones features a large ensemble cast, including established actors such as Sean Bean, Mark Addy, Nikolaj Coster-Waldau, Michelle Fairley, Lena Headey, Iain Glen, and Peter Dinklage, and newcomers such as Emilia Clarke, Kit Harington, Sophie Turner, and Maisie Williams. Critics praised the show's production values and cast; Dinklage's portrayal of Tyrion Lannister received specific accolades, as did Bean and Clarke, as well as Ramin Djawadi for music. The first season won a Peabody Award and two of the thirteen Emmy Awards for which it was nominated: Outstanding Supporting Actor in a Drama Series (Dinklage) and Outstanding Main Title Design. It was also nominated for Outstanding Drama Series. U.S. viewership rose by approximately 33% over the course of the season, from 2.2 million to over 3 million by the finale.

== Episodes ==
No. overall	No. in season	Title	Directed by	Written by	Original release date	U.S. viewers (millions)
1	1	"Winter Is Coming"	Tim Van Patten	David Benioff & D. B. Weiss	April 17, 2011	2.22
North of the Seven Kingdoms of Westeros, Night's Watch soldiers are attacked by supernatural White Walkers. One soldier escapes but is captured at Castle Winterfell. Eddard "Ned" Stark, Warden of the North, executes him for desertion. Later, six orphaned dire wolf pups are found and one given to each Stark sibling, including Ned's bastard son, Jon Snow. In King's Landing, the Seven Kingdoms capital, Jon Arryn, the Hand of the King, dies suddenly. King Robert Baratheon, Ned's old friend, travels to Winterfell to recruit Ned and propose a marriage between his heir Joffrey and Ned's daughter, Sansa. Lysa Arryn, Jon Arryn's widow, sends her sister (Ned's wife), Catelyn, a letter claiming the Lannisters, Queen Cersei's family, murdered Arryn. Catelyn believes the Lannisters are now plotting against King Robert. Ned's young son, Bran, climbs a tall tower and witnesses Cersei and her twin brother, Jaime Lannister, inside having sex. To hide their incest, Jaime pushes Bran from the high window. Across the Narrow Sea in Essos, exiled Prince Viserys Targaryen forces his sister, Daenerys, to marry the Dothraki warlord, Drogo, in exchange for an army to conquer Westeros and reclaim the Iron Throne. The ancient Targaryens once commanded dragons, and Daenerys is given three fossilized dragon eggs as a wedding gift.
2	2	"The Kingsroad"	Tim Van Patten	David Benioff & D. B. Weiss	April 24, 2011	2.20
Ned, the new Hand of the King, travels to King's Landing accompanied by his daughters, Sansa and Arya. Catelyn remains at Winterfell to care for the still unconscious Bran. An assassin attacks Bran, but Catelyn fends him off and Bran's direwolf, Summer, kills him. Catelyn suspects the Lannisters were behind the attack. Ned's illegitimate son, Jon, heads north to the Wall to join his uncle, Benjen Stark, as part of the Night's Watch, and Queen Cersei's younger brother, Tyrion Lannister, accompanies him on the trip. Along the Kingsroad on their way towards King's Landing, Prince Joffrey threatens Arya's young commoner friend, later having him killed. Nymeria, Arya's direwolf, defends her, biting Joffrey. Cersei demands that Robert have the wolf killed, but Arya releases Nymeria to the wild. Sansa's direwolf, Lady, is killed instead. Meanwhile, Daenerys is befriended by Ser Jorah Mormont, a disgraced knight, while she focuses on learning how to please Drogo.
3	3	"Lord Snow"	Brian Kirk	David Benioff & D. B. Weiss	May 1, 2011	2.44
Ned attends the King's Small Council and learns Westeros has been poorly managed and is deeply in debt. Learning that Arya aspires to be a swordsman and got a sword from Jon, he sends her to swordsmanship lessons. Catelyn travels to King's Landing to covertly warn her husband about the assassination attempt, but she is intercepted by her childhood friend, Councillor Petyr "Littlefinger" Baelish. Bran learns he will never walk again and remains unable to remember the events leading to his fall. At the Wall, Jon proves himself more skilled than the low-born and convicted criminals that joined the Night's Watch, and Lord Commander Jeor Mormont asks a departing Tyrion to plead with the King to send more recruits. Daenerys, now pregnant, stands up to Viserys, threatening him if he ever abuses her again.
4	4	"Cripples, Bastards, and Broken Things"	Brian Kirk	Bryan Cogman	May 8, 2011	2.45
While returning to King's Landing, Tyrion stops at Winterfell where he presents the Starks a saddle design that will allow the paraplegic Bran to ride a horse. He unexpectedly finds Catelyn in a roadside tavern, prompting her to rally her father's Riverrun allies to arrest Tyrion for conspiring to murder her son. Ned secretly investigates Jon Arryn's death, and in the process, discovers one of King Robert's illegitimate children, Gendry. Jon takes measures to protect Samwell Tarly, an awkward and friendless Night's Watch recruit, from the other Watchmen's abuse. A frustrated Viserys clashes with his newly-empowered sister.
5	5	"The Wolf and the Lion"	Brian Kirk	David Benioff & D. B. Weiss	May 15, 2011	2.58
King Robert's eunuch spy, Varys, has uncovered that Daenerys Targaryen is pregnant. Ned rejects Robert's plan to assassinate her, considering Daenerys a non-threat, and resigns in protest as Hand of the King. Catelyn takes Tyrion prisoner at her sister Lysa Arryn's fortress home in the Eyrie. News of Tyrion's capture reaches King's Landing where Jaime Lannister, the Queen's twin brother, demands answers from Ned, prompting them to fight. One of Jaime's men stabs Ned in the leg from behind, leaving him wounded, and Jaime departs to get Tyrion.
6	6	"A Golden Crown"	Daniel Minahan	Story by : David Benioff & D. B. Weiss; Teleplay by : Jane Espenson and David Benioff & D. B. Weiss	May 22, 2011	2.44
King Robert reappoints Ned as Hand and tasks him with running affairs until Robert returns from hunting. Learning that Ser Gregor Clegane, a Lannister retainer known as "the Mountain", has committed atrocities in Riverrun, Ned sentences him to death and summons Tywin Lannister to a trial. Fearing war with the Lannisters, Ned orders Arya and Sansa return to Winterfell for their safety, and discovers that Joffrey and his two siblings are not Robert's biological children, and were fathered by Jaime Lannister. Bran, while testing his new saddle, is attacked by rogue Wildings, prompting him to be rescued by his brother Robb and Ned's captive ward Theon, who also take the woman Wilding, Osha, as a slave. In the Vale, Tyrion demands a trial by combat. Lysa chooses Ser Vardis Egen as her champion, while sellsword Bronn volunteers as Tyrion's champion. Bronn wins and obtains Tyrion's release. Meanwhile, Viserys grows impatient and angry waiting for Drogo to fulfill his promise, and he threatens to kill Daenerys' unborn child. Drogo kills Viserys by pouring molten gold on his head.
7	7	"You Win or You Die"	Daniel Minahan	David Benioff & D. B. Weiss	May 29, 2011	2.40
In King's Landing, Ned confronts Cersei, saying he knows Jaime fathered her children and will inform King Robert. Mortally wounded by a boar, Robert dictates his will and testament to Ned, naming him regent until Joffrey comes of age. Instead of "Joffrey", Ned writes "my rightful heir", and sends word to Stannis, Robert's brother, the legal heir to the throne. After Robert's death, Ned confronts Cersei and Joffrey in the throne room, where Baelish and the City Watch betray Ned and attack his men. At the Wall, Benjen Stark disappears during a foray north of the Wall. Jon and Sam are assigned as stewards, with Jon as Lord Commander Jeor Mormont's personal servant, with Sam believing Mormont intends to groom Jon for command. In Essos, King Robert's hired assassin is exposed by Ser Jorah before he can poison Daenerys. Drogo vows to conquer the Seven Kingdoms for his unborn son and starts marching towards Westeros.
8	8	"The Pointy End"	Daniel Minahan	George R. R. Martin	June 5, 2011	2.72
Arya escapes the Red Keep after Syrio Forel, her Braavosian sword master, fends off guards sent to arrest her, while Sansa is captured. Robb hears the news and prepares the Northern armies to fight the Lannisters, leaving Bran behind to rule Winterfell. Lysa refuses to fight the Lannisters, and Catelyn leaves to join Robb's camp. Tyrion and Bronn are ambushed by tribesmen, who Tyrion convinces to escort him to his father Tywin Lannister. At the camp, Tywin asks tribesman leader Shagga to help them confront the Starks in exchange for even greater payment. At the Wall, Jon and Sam bring back bodies affected by the White Walkers, one of whom awakens as a wight and attacks Commander Mormont before Jon kills it. In Essos, Drogo's soldiers begin attacking nearby settlements, enslaving locals in order to sell them to raise money to buy ships to cross the Narrow Sea. Drogo is wounded in a fight. Joffrey appoints his grandfather, Tywin, as Hand of the King. Sansa begs Joffrey to show Ned mercy, and he agrees if Ned publicly recognizes Joffrey's claim to the throne and admits to committing treason.
9	9	"Baelor"	Alan Taylor	David Benioff & D. B. Weiss	June 12, 2011	2.66
The Stark army arrives at the Twins castle; Catelyn persuades Lord Walder Frey to allow them to pass through his land and assist them in exchange for Robb and Arya marrying two of Frey's offspring in the future. At the Wall, Jeor Mormont gives his family Valyrian steel sword to Jon in gratitude. In Essos, Drogo's wound becomes septic and his death imminent. Daenerys asks a mystic slave woman, Mirri Maz Duur, to use blood magic to save him. Mirri tells everyone to remain outside the tent until after the spell is cast. Daenerys goes into labor, and Jorah brings her into the tent seeking aid. Robb sacrifices 2,000 soldiers to fight the Lannister army as a diversion so he can move his army and capture Jaime. In a public hearing, Ned confesses to treason and publicly affirms Joffrey is the rightful heir. However, rather than sparing his life as negotiated, the vengeful and increasingly insane Joffrey has him beheaded, while Sansa, Cersei, and other counselors object futilely.
10	10	"Fire and Blood"	Alan Taylor	David Benioff & D. B. Weiss	June 19, 2011	3.04
The North secedes from the Seven Kingdoms and proclaims Robb as king. With Jaime as the Starks' prisoner and Robert's two brothers, Stannis and Renly, each challenging Joffrey's claim to the throne, Tywin appoints Tyrion as acting King's Hand, while Tywin fights to defend Joffrey's reign. Jon attempts to desert the Night's Watch to avenge Ned and join Robb, but the others convince him to honor his oath. Mormont then sends Jon in an expedition to search for Benjen Stark beyond the Wall. Yoren, a Night's Watch recruiter, smuggles Arya out of King's Landing disguised as a boy, while Joffrey intends to crown Sansa his queen, despite executing her father. Daenerys's baby is born deformed and dead, and Drogo is left in a vegetative state by Mirri's treacherous magic, prompting Daenerys to end his life. She places the three dragon eggs on Drogo’s funeral pyre, has Mirri tied to it, and sets it alight, burning Mirri alive. Ignoring Jorah's pleas, she walks into the flames. When the embers die the following morning, Daenerys is found in the ashes, unharmed, flanked by three newly-hatched baby dragons. Jorah and other witnesses kneel before her.

== Cast ==
=== Main cast ===
==== Starring ====
- Sean Bean as Eddard "Ned" Stark
- Mark Addy as Robert Baratheon
- Nikolaj Coster-Waldau as Jaime Lannister
- Michelle Fairley as Catelyn Stark
- Lena Headey as Cersei Lannister
- Emilia Clarke as Daenerys Targaryen
- Iain Glen as Jorah Mormont
- Harry Lloyd as Viserys Targaryen
- Kit Harington as Jon Snow
- Sophie Turner as Sansa Stark
- Maisie Williams as Arya Stark
- Richard Madden as Robb Stark
- Alfie Allen as Theon Greyjoy
- Isaac Hempstead Wright as Bran Stark
- Jack Gleeson as Joffrey Baratheon
- Rory McCann as Sandor "The Hound" Clegane
- Peter Dinklage as Tyrion Lannister
- Aidan Gillen as Petyr "Littlefinger" Baelish

==== Also starring ====
- Jason Momoa as Khal Drogo

=== Guest cast ===
The recurring actors listed here are those who appeared in season 1. They are listed by the region in which they first appear:

==== At and beyond the Wall ====
- James Cosmo as Jeor Mormont
- Peter Vaughan as Maester Aemon
- Brian Fortune as Othell Yarwyck
- Joseph Mawle as Benjen Stark
- Owen Teale as Alliser Thorne
- Francis Magee as Yoren
- John Bradley as Samwell Tarly
- Josef Altin as Pyp
- Mark Stanley as Grenn
- Luke McEwan as Rast
- Rob Ostlere as Waymar Royce
- Bronson Webb as Will
- Dermot Keaney as Gared

==== In King's Landing ====
- Callum Wharry as Tommen Baratheon
- Aimee Richardson as Myrcella Baratheon
- Gethin Anthony as Renly Baratheon
- Julian Glover as Grand Maester Pycelle
- Conleth Hill as Varys
- Ian McElhinney as Barristan Selmy
- Ian Beattie as Meryn Trant
- David Michael Scott as Beric Dondarrion
- Finn Jones as Loras Tyrell
- Eugene Simon as Lancel Lannister
- Wilko Johnson as Ilyn Payne
- Conan Stevens as Gregor Clegane
- Dominic Carter as Janos Slynt
- Jefferson Hall as Hugh of the Vale
- Miltos Yerolemou as Syrio Forel
- Andrew Wilde as Tobho Mott
- Joe Dempsie as Gendry
- Eros Vlahos as Lommy Greenhands
- Ben Hawkey as Hot Pie

==== In the North ====
- Art Parkinson as Rickon Stark
- Clive Mantle as Greatjon Umber
- Steven Blount as Rickard Karstark
- Donald Sumpter as Maester Luwin
- Ron Donachie as Rodrik Cassel
- Jamie Sives as Jory Cassel
- Susan Brown as Septa Mordane
- Margaret John as Old Nan
- Kristian Nairn as Hodor
- Esmé Bianco as Ros
- Natalia Tena as Osha

==== In the Riverlands ====
- Charles Dance as Tywin Lannister
- David Bradley as Walder Frey
- Ian Gelder as Kevan Lannister
- Jerome Flynn as Bronn
- Emun Elliott as Marillion
- Sibel Kekilli as Shae
- Rhodri Hosking as Mycah

==== In the Vale ====
- Lino Facioli as Robin Arryn
- Kate Dickie as Lysa Arryn
- Mark Lewis Jones as Shagga

==== In Essos ====
- Roger Allam as Illyrio Mopatis
- Dar Salim as Qotho
- Elyes Gabel as Rakharo
- Amrita Acharia as Irri
- Roxanne McKee as Doreah
- Mia Soteriou as Mirri Maz Duur

== Production ==
HBO originally optioned the rights to A Song of Ice and Fire in 2007, at which time David Benioff and D. B. Weiss were identified as the project's writers and executive producers. The first and second drafts of the pilot script, written by Benioff and Weiss, were submitted in August 2007, and June 2008, respectively. While HBO found both drafts to their liking, a pilot was not ordered until November 2008, with the 2007–2008 Writers Guild of America strike possibly delaying the process.

Benioff and Weiss served as main writers and showrunners for the first season. They contributed eight out of ten episodes, including one co-written with Jane Espenson. The two remaining episodes were written by Bryan Cogman and A Song of Ice and Fire author George R. R. Martin.

Tom McCarthy directed the original pilot, but much of this was later re-shot by Tim Van Patten as the pilot was reworked into the first episode of the complete season. Van Patten also directed the second episode. McCarthy is still credited as a consulting producer for the series' first episode. Brian Kirk and Daniel Minahan directed three episodes each, and Alan Taylor directed the final two.

Before Game of Thrones both Benioff and Weiss worked in film, and were unfamiliar with working on a television show. This resulted in several first-season episodes being about 10 minutes too short for HBO, forcing them to write another 100 pages of scripts in two weeks. Due to lack of budget the new scenes were designed to be inexpensive to film, such as two actors conversing in one room. Benioff and Weiss noted that some of their favorite scenes from the first season were the results of the dilemma, including one between Robert and Cersei Baratheon discussing their marriage.

=== Casting ===
On May 5, 2009, it was announced that Peter Dinklage had been signed on to star as Tyrion Lannister in the pilot, and that Tom McCarthy was set to direct. On July 19, 2009, a number of further casting decisions were announced, including Sean Bean being given the role of Ned Stark. Other actors signed on for the pilot were Kit Harington in the role of Jon Snow, Jack Gleeson as Joffrey Baratheon, Harry Lloyd as Viserys Targaryen, and Mark Addy as Robert Baratheon.

At the beginning of August 2009, it was revealed that Catelyn Stark would be portrayed by Jennifer Ehle. On August 20, more casting announcements were made, including Nikolaj Coster-Waldau as Jaime Lannister and Tamzin Merchant as Daenerys Targaryen, as well as Richard Madden in the role of Robb Stark, Iain Glen as Ser Jorah Mormont, Alfie Allen as Theon Greyjoy, Sophie Turner as Sansa Stark and Maisie Williams as Arya Stark. On September 1 Lena Headey was announced as Cersei Lannister. On September 23, Martin confirmed that Rory McCann had been cast as Sandor Clegane. Isaac Hempstead-Wright was confirmed as Bran Stark on October 14, followed by an announcement of Jason Momoa as Khal Drogo three days later.

After the pilot was shot and the series picked up, it was announced that the role of Catelyn had been recast, with Michelle Fairley replacing Ehle. Later, it was also confirmed that Emilia Clarke would replace Tamzin Merchant as Daenerys. The rest of the cast was filled out in the second half of the year, and included Charles Dance as Tywin Lannister, Aidan Gillen as Petyr 'Littlefinger' Baelish, and Conleth Hill as Varys.

=== Filming ===
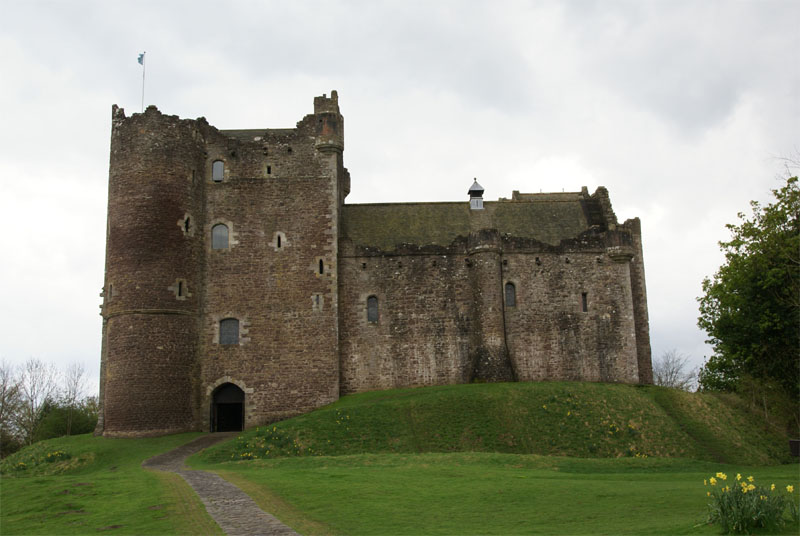
Doune Castle was used as the set for Winterfell in the pilot.

The pilot episode was initially filmed on location in Northern Ireland, Scotland, and Morocco by Tom McCarthy between October 24 and November 19, 2009. However, the pilot was deemed unsatisfactory and much of it had to be reshot together with the other episodes of the season in Northern Ireland and Malta.

Most scenes were shot in Northern Ireland and Republic of Ireland border counties. Principal photography was scheduled to begin on July 26, 2010, with the primary studio location being the Paint Hall Studio in the Titanic Quarter of Belfast, Northern Ireland. Among various locations for the initial shooting of the pilot in 2009, Doune Castle in central Scotland was used as the location for Winterfell, including scenes at its great hall (the great hall was later recreated in a soundstage in Northern Ireland). Additional filming locations included Cairncastle at Larne, Shane's Castle, and Tollymore Forest Park, all in Northern Ireland. In the 2010 shooting of the series, Castle Ward was used as Winterfell instead of Doune Castle, with Cairncastle for some exterior Winterfell scenes. The set for Castle Black was built at Magheramorne quarry. The show's presence in Northern Ireland and use of Paint Hall created hundreds of jobs for residents, and made the area "a hub for film and television production".

The "King's Landing" exterior scenes were shot at various locations in Malta, including the city of Mdina and the island of Gozo. The filming in Malta resulted in controversy when a protected ecosystem was damaged by a subcontractor.

=== Music ===
The soundtrack to Game of Thrones was originally to be composed by Stephen Warbeck. On February 2, 2011, only ten weeks prior to the show's premiere, it was reported that Warbeck had left the project and Ramin Djawadi had been commissioned to write the music instead. The music supervisor of Game of Thrones Evyen Klean first suggested Djawadi to Benioff and Weiss as the replacement for Warbeck, and although Djawadi was reluctant as he had other commitments at that time, they managed to persuade Djawadi to accept the project.

To give the series its own distinctive musical identity, according to Djawadi, the producers asked him not to use musical elements such as flutes or solo vocals that had already been successfully used by other major fantasy productions. He mentioned that a challenge in scoring the series was its reliance on dialogue and its sprawling cast: on several occasions already-scored music had to be omitted so as not to get in the way of dialogue.

Djawadi said that he was inspired to write the main title music by an early version of the series's computer-animated title sequence. The title music is reprised as a global theme in the rest of the soundtrack, initially infrequently and as part of the theme of individual characters, then in full towards the end of season 1 during particularly important scenes.

== Reception ==
=== Pre-release ===
Anticipation for the series was described by various media outlets as very high, with a dedicated fan base closely following the show's development. By April 2011, multiple entertainment news outlets had put it at the top of their lists of television events to look forward to in 2011.

=== Critical response ===
Game of Thrones season 1: Critical reception by episode
Season 1 (2011): Percentage of positive critics' reviews tracked by the website Rotten Tomatoes

On Rotten Tomatoes, the first season has a 90% approval rating from 224 critics with an average rating of 8.35 out of 10. The site's critical consensus reads, "Its intricate storytelling and dark themes may overwhelm some viewers, but Game of Thrones is a transportive, well-acted, smartly written drama even non-genre fans can appreciate." The first season of Game of Thrones has a Metacritic average of 80 out of 100 based on 28 critic reviews, categorized as "generally favorable".

The majority of reviews for the first season were very positive, with critics noting the high production values, the well-realized world, compelling characters, and giving particular note to the strength of the child actors.

Robert Bianco of USA Today gave the season a positive review and stated, "It's all very well told and well acted, but those who insist on comparing it to The Lord of the Rings are setting up expectations Game [Of Thrones] cannot possibly match." Tim Goodman of The Hollywood Reporter gave the season a positive review and stated, "Worth the wait? Absolutely. And even if you have no idea what all the fuss is about, you should get in from the start to absorb Martin's fantastical tale." Mary McNamara of the Los Angeles Times gave the season a positive review and stated that it was a "a great and thundering series of political and psychological intrigue bristling with vivid characters, cross-hatched with tantalizing plotlines and seasoned with a splash of fantasy." Ken Tucker of Entertainment Weekly gave it a score of 'A−' and stated, "Free your eyes to take in the spectacle, and your brain will magically start following the intricate storytelling. And there's a magical realism to Game of Thrones."

James Poniewozik of Time gave the season a positive review and stated, "This epic, unflinching fantasy noir takes our preconceptions of chivalry, nobility and magic and gets medieval on them." Alan Sepinwall of HitFix gave the season a positive review too and stated, "Game of Thrones deposits me in a world I never expected to visit and doesn't leave me feeling stranded and adrift, but eager to immerse myself in the local culture." Brian Lowry of Variety gave the season a positive review and stated, "In terms of visual ambition and atmosphere, this series challenges the movie world on summer-tentpole turf, while simultaneously capitalizing on an episodic approach that allows the interlocking stories to unfold in a manner no feature ever could."

Phillip Maciak of Slant Magazine gave it 2.5 out of 4 stars and stated, "If Game of Thrones can find its place in the personal (in the power, corruption, and integrity to be found in individual souls), then it can transcend the ugly social and historical dynamics that it so casually relies on and reproduces." David Hinckley of New York Daily News stated, "Fans of the acclaimed Game of Thrones books, or even fans of fantasy realms in general, will find much to admire and enjoy here."

Troy Patterson of Slate gave the season a negative review and stated, "There is the sense of intricacy having been confused with intrigue and of a story transferred all too faithfully from its source and thus not transformed to meet the demands of the screen." Hank Stuever of The Washington Post gave the season a negative review and stated, "Even for the most open minds, Game of Thrones can be a big stein of groggy slog." Ginia Bellafante of The New York Times gave the season a negative review and stated, "Game of Thrones serves up a lot of confusion in the name of no larger or really relevant idea beyond sketchily fleshed-out notions that war is ugly, families are insidious and power is hot."

=== Ratings ===
The first episode attracted 2.2 million viewers its initial airing on April 17 in the U.S., and totaled 5.4 million viewers across multiple Sunday and Monday night airings. It averaged 743,000 and reached a peak 823,000 in UK and Ireland on its April 18 premiere. HBO announced that they would be commissioning a second season on the strength of the reception of the premiere episode. By the final episode of the season, which aired June 20, the ratings had climbed to over 3 million.

=== Accolades ===
The first season of Game of Thrones was nominated for thirteen Emmy Awards, including Outstanding Drama Series, Outstanding Directing for a Drama Series (Tim Van Patten for "Winter Is Coming"), and Outstanding Writing for a Drama Series (David Benioff and D. B. Weiss for "Baelor"). It won two: Outstanding Supporting Actor in a Drama Series (Peter Dinklage) and Outstanding Main Title Design. Dinklage, who plays Tyrion, was also named best supporting actor by the Golden Globes, the Scream Awards and the Satellite Awards.

Awards and nominations
Year	Award	Category	Nominee(s)	Result	Ref.
2011	AFI Awards	AFI TV Award	Game of Thrones	Won	
2011	Artios Awards	Outstanding Achievement in Casting – Television Pilot Drama	Nina Gold	Nominated	
2011	Artios Awards	Outstanding Achievement in Casting – Television Series Drama	Nina Gold	Nominated	
2011	Portal Award	Best Actor	Sean Bean	Won	
2011	Portal Award	Best Actress	Lena Headey	Nominated	
2011	Portal Award	Best Supporting Actor	Peter Dinklage	Nominated	
2011	Portal Award	Best Episode	"Winter Is Coming"	Won	
2011	Portal Award	Best Series	Game of Thrones	Won	
2011	Portal Award	Best Young Actor	Isaac Hempstead-Wright	Nominated	
2011	Portal Award	Best Young Actor	Maisie Williams	Nominated	
2011	EWwy Award	Best Supporting Actress, Drama	Emilia Clarke	Won	
2011	EWwy Award	Best Actor, Drama	Sean Bean	Nominated	
2011	63rd Primetime Emmy Awards	Outstanding Directing for a Drama Series	Tim Van Patten for "Winter Is Coming"	Nominated	
2011	63rd Primetime Emmy Awards	Outstanding Drama Series	Vince Gerardis, Frank Doelger, Ralph Vicinanza, Mark Huffam, David Benioff, Carolyn Strauss, George R. R. Martin, Guymon Casady and D. B. Weiss	Nominated	
2011	63rd Primetime Emmy Awards	Outstanding Supporting Actor in a Drama Series	Peter Dinklage	Won	
2011	63rd Primetime Emmy Awards	Outstanding Writing for a Drama Series	David Benioff and D. B. Weiss for "Baelor"	Nominated	
2011	63rd Primetime Creative Arts Emmy Awards	Outstanding Casting for a Drama Series	Nina Gold and Robert Sterne	Nominated	
2011	63rd Primetime Creative Arts Emmy Awards	Outstanding Costumes for a Series	Michele Clapton and Rachael Webb-Crozier for "The Pointy End"	Nominated	
2011	63rd Primetime Creative Arts Emmy Awards	Outstanding Hairstyling for a Single-Camera Series	Kevin Alexander and Candice Banks for "A Golden Crown"	Nominated	
2011	63rd Primetime Creative Arts Emmy Awards	Outstanding Main Title Design	Angus Wall, Hameed Shaukat, Kirk Shintani and Robert Feng	Won	
2011	63rd Primetime Creative Arts Emmy Awards	Outstanding Makeup for a Single-Camera Series (Non-Prosthetic)	Paul Engelen and Melissa Lackersteen for "Winter Is Coming"	Nominated	
2011	63rd Primetime Creative Arts Emmy Awards	Outstanding Prosthetic Makeup for a Series, Miniseries, Movie or a Special	Paul Engelen and Conor O'Sullivan for "A Golden Crown"	Nominated	
2011	63rd Primetime Creative Arts Emmy Awards	Outstanding Sound Editing for a Series	Robin Quinn, Steve Fanagan, Eoghan McDonnell, Jon Stevenson, Tim Hands, Stefan Henrix, Caoimhe Doyle, Michelle McCormack and Andy Kennedy for "A Golden Crown"	Nominated	
2011	63rd Primetime Creative Arts Emmy Awards	Outstanding Special Visual Effects	Rafael Morant, Adam McInnes, Graham Hills, Lucy Ainsworth-Taylor, Stuart Brisdon, Damien Macé, Henry Badgett and Angela Barson for "Fire and Blood"	Nominated	
2011	63rd Primetime Creative Arts Emmy Awards	Outstanding Stunt Coordination	Paul Jennings for "The Wolf and the Lion"	Nominated	
2011	Women's Image Network Awards	Actress Drama Series	Lena Headey	Nominated	
2011	International Film Music Critics Association	Best Original Score for a Television Series	Ramin Djawadi	Nominated	
2011	1st Critics' Choice Television Awards	Best Drama Series	Game of Thrones	Nominated	
2011	69th Golden Globe Awards	Best Supporting Actor – Series, Miniseries or Television Film	Peter Dinklage	Won	
2011	69th Golden Globe Awards	Best Television Series – Drama	Game of Thrones	Nominated	
2011	Peabody Award		Game of Thrones	Won	
2011	16th Satellite Awards	Best Supporting Actor – Series, Miniseries or Television Film	Peter Dinklage	Won	
2011	16th Satellite Awards	Best Television Series – Genre	Game of Thrones	Nominated	
2011	Scream Awards	Best Ensemble	Game of Thrones	Nominated	
2011	Scream Awards	Best Fantasy Actor	Sean Bean	Nominated	
2011	Scream Awards	Best Fantasy Actress	Lena Headey	Nominated	
2011	Scream Awards	Best Supporting Actor	Peter Dinklage	Won	
2011	Scream Awards	Best TV Show	Game of Thrones	Won	
2011	Scream Awards	Breakout Performance – Female	Emilia Clarke	Won	
2011	Scream Awards	Most Memorable Mutilation	"Head covered in molten gold" from "A Golden Crown"	Nominated	
2011	Scream Awards	The Ultimate Scream	Game of Thrones	Nominated	
2011	27th TCA Awards	Individual Achievement in Drama	Peter Dinklage	Nominated	
2011	27th TCA Awards	Outstanding Achievement in Drama	Game of Thrones	Nominated	
2011	27th TCA Awards	Outstanding New Program	Game of Thrones	Won	
2011	27th TCA Awards	Program of the Year	Game of Thrones	Nominated	
2011	IGN Awards	Best TV Hero	Sean Bean as Ned Stark	Won	
2011	IGN Awards	Best TV Twist	Off with his head!	Won	
2011	IGN Awards	Best TV Episode	"Baelor"	Won	
2011	IGN Awards	Best TV Series	Game of Thrones	Nominated	
2011	IGN Awards	Best TV Drama Series	Game of Thrones	Nominated	
2011	IGN Awards	Best TV Actor	Peter Dinklage	Nominated	
2011	IGN Awards	Best TV Actress	Emilia Clarke	Nominated	
2011	IGN Awards	Best TV Hero	Kit Harington as Jon Snow	Nominated	
2011	IGN Awards	Best TV Villain	Jack Gleeson as Joffrey Baratheon	Nominated	
2011	IGN People's Choice Award	Best TV Series	Game of Thrones	Won	
2011	IGN People's Choice Award	Best TV Drama Series	Game of Thrones	Won	
2011	IGN People's Choice Award	Best TV Hero	Sean Bean as Ned Stark	Won	
2011	IGN People's Choice Award	Best TV Twist	Off with his head!	Won	
2011	IGN People's Choice Award	Best TV Episode	"Baelor"	Nominated	
2011	IGN People's Choice Award	Best TV Hero	Kit Harington as Jon Snow	Nominated	
2011	IGN People's Choice Award	Best TV Actor	Peter Dinklage	Nominated	
2011	IGN People's Choice Award	Best TV Actress	Emilia Clarke	Nominated	
2011	IGN People's Choice Award	Best TV Villain	Jack Gleeson as Joffrey Baratheon	Nominated	
2011	Writers Guild of America Awards	New Series	David Benioff, Bryan Cogman, Jane Espenson, George R. R. Martin, D. B. Weiss	Nominated	
2011	Writers Guild of America Awards	Television Drama Series	David Benioff, Bryan Cogman, Jane Espenson, George R. R. Martin, D. B. Weiss	Nominated	
2012	People's Choice Awards	Favorite Cable TV Drama	Game of Thrones	Nominated	
2012	ADG Excellence in Production Design Award	One-Hour Single Camera Television Series	Gemma Jackson for "A Golden Crown"	Nominated	
2012	Gracie Allen Awards	Outstanding Female Rising Star in a Drama Series or Special	Emilia Clarke	Won	
2012	SFX Awards	Best New TV Show	David Benioff and D. B. Weiss	Won	
2012	SFX Awards	Best TV Show	David Benioff and D. B. Weiss	Nominated	
2012	SFX Awards	Best Actress	Maisie Williams	Nominated	
2012	SFX Awards	Best Actor	Peter Dinklage	Nominated	
2012	NewNowNext Awards	TV You Betta Watch	Game of Thrones	Nominated	
2012	Golden Reel Awards	Best Sound Editing – Short Form Dialogue and ADR in Television	Game of Thrones for "Cripples, Bastards, and Broken Things"	Won	
2012	Golden Reel Awards	Best Sound Editing – Short Form Sound Effects and Foley in Television	Game of Thrones for "Winter Is Coming"	Won	
2012	Costume Designers Guild Awards	Outstanding Period/Fantasy Television Series	Game of Thrones	Nominated	
2012	64th Directors Guild of America Awards	Dramatic Series	Tim Van Patten for "Winter Is Coming"	Nominated	
2012	American Cinema Editors	Best Edited One-Hour Series For Non-Commercial Television	Frances Parker for "Baelor"	Nominated	
2012	Cinema Audio Society Awards	Outstanding Achievement in Sound Mixing – Television Series – One Hour	Ronan Hill, Mark Taylor for "Baelor"	Nominated	
2012	9th Irish Film & Television Awards	Best Television Drama	Mark Huffam	Nominated	
2012	9th Irish Film & Television Awards	Best Director Television Drama	Brian Kirk	Nominated	
2012	9th Irish Film & Television Awards	Best Actress – Television	Michelle Fairley	Nominated	
2012	9th Irish Film & Television Awards	Best Supporting Actor – Television	Aidan Gillen	Nominated	
2012	9th Irish Film & Television Awards	Best Sound (Film/TV Drama)	Ronan Hill	Nominated	
2012	9th Irish Film & Television Awards	Best Sound	Ronan Hill	Nominated	
2012	Astra Awards	Favourite Program – International Drama	Game of Thrones	Won	
2012	Hugo Awards	Best Dramatic Presentation, Long Form	David Benioff, D. B. Weiss, Bryan Cogman, Jane Espenson, George R. R. Martin (writers), Tim Van Patten, Brian Kirk, Daniel Minahan, Alan Taylor (directors)	Won	
2012	Kerrang! Awards	Best TV Show	Game of Thrones	Won	
2012	Producers Guild Awards	"The Norman Felton Award for Outstanding Producer of Episodic Television, Drama"	David Benioff, Frank Doelger, Mark Huffam, Carolyn Strauss, D. B. Weiss	Nominated	
2012	Saturn Award	Best Television Presentation	Game of Thrones	Nominated	
2012	Saturn Award	Best Actor on Television	Sean Bean	Nominated	
2012	Saturn Award	Best Actress on Television	Lena Headey	Nominated	
2012	Saturn Award	Best Supporting Actor on Television	Kit Harington	Nominated	
2012	18th Screen Actors Guild Awards	Outstanding Performance by An Ensemble in a Drama Series	Amrita Acharia, Mark Addy, Alfie Allen, Josef Altin, Sean Bean, Susan Brown, Emilia Clarke, Nikolaj Coster-Waldau, Peter Dinklage, Ron Donachie, Michelle Fairley, Jerome Flynn, Elyes Gabel, Aidan Gillen, Jack Gleeson, Iain Glen, Julian Glover, Kit Harington, Lena Headey, Isaac Hempstead Wright, Conleth Hill, Richard Madden, Jason Momoa, Rory McCann, Ian McElhinney, Luke McEwan, Roxanne McKee, Dar Salim, Mark Stanley, Donald Sumpter, Sophie Turner and Maisie Williams	Nominated	
2012	18th Screen Actors Guild Awards	Outstanding Performance by a Stunt Ensemble in a Television Series	Game of Thrones	Won	
2012	IGN People's Choice Award	Best TV DVD or Blu-ray	For the complete first season on Blu-ray	Won	
2012	Visual Effects Society	Outstanding Animated Character in a Commercial or Broadcast Program	Henry Badgett, Mark Brown, Rafael Morant, James Sutton for "Fire and Blood"	Nominated	
2012	Visual Effects Society	Outstanding Created Environment in a Commercial or Broadcast Program	Markus Kuha, Damien Macé, Dante Harbridge Robinson, Fani Vassiadi for "The Icewall"	Won	
2012	Visual Effects Society	Outstanding Supporting Visual Effects in a Broadcast Program	Lucy Ainsworth-Taylor, Angela Barson, Ed Bruce, Adam McInnes for "Winter Is Coming"	Won	

== Release ==
=== Broadcast ===
Game of Thrones premiered on HBO in the United States and Canada on April 17, 2011, and on Sky Atlantic in the United Kingdom and Ireland on April 18, 2011, with a same-day release on HBO Central Europe. The series premiered in Australia on Showcase on July 17, 2011.

=== Home media ===
The first season of Game of Thrones was released on DVD and Blu-ray Disc on March 6, 2012. The set includes extra background and behind-the-scenes material, but no deleted scenes, because almost all footage shot for the first season was used in the show.

HBO released a Collector's Edition DVD/Blu-ray combo pack of the first season, which includes a resin-carved Dragon Egg Paperweight. The set was released in the United States and Canada on November 20, 2012. The first season was released on 4K UHD Blu-ray on June 5, 2018.

Game of Thrones: The Complete First Season
Set details	Special features	
Format: AC-3, Blu-ray, DTS Surround Sound, Dubbed, NTSC, Subtitled, Widescreen; Language: English, French, Spanish; Subtitles: English, French, Spanish, Castilian, Portuguese, Polish, Dutch, Danish, Finnish, Norwegian, Swedish; 16:9 aspect ratio; 5-disc set, 10 episodes	"Making Game of Thrones": A 30-minute feature including new footage from the set and interviews.; "Creating the Show Open": Portrays the creation of the opening title sequence.; "From the Book to the Screen": Interviews with Benioff, Weiss, and Martin about the adaptation process.; "Character Profiles": Fifteen principal characters described by their actors.; "The Night’s Watch": An examination of the warrior order that Jon Snow joins.; "Creating the Dothraki Language": Covers the creation of the Dothraki language.; Seven audio commentaries by, among others, Benioff, Weiss, Martin, Clarke, Dinklage and Harington.; Blu-ray exclusive: "Complete Guide to Westeros", an interactive compendium of the noble houses and lands featured in Season One, and 24 histories of the Seven Kingdoms as told by the series's characters.; "Anatomy of an Episode": A detailed feature about the production of episode six, A Golden Crown.; "In-Episode Guide": Provides background information about characters, locations, and histories while each episode plays.; "Hidden Dragon Eggs", easter eggs.	
DVD release dates
Region 1	Region 2	Region 4
March 6, 2012	March 5, 2012	August 10, 2012
