= Baelor =

- Game of Thrones episode
- Episode no.: Season 1 Episode 9
- Directed by: Alan Taylor
- Written by: David Benioff; D. B. Weiss
- Cinematography by: Alik Sakharov
- Editing by: Frances Parker
- Original air date: June 12, 2011
- Running time: 56 minutes

Guest appearances
- Conleth Hill as Varys; Jerome Flynn as Bronn; James Cosmo as Ser Jeor Mormont; Ron Donachie as Ser Rodrik Cassel; Charles Dance as Lord Tywin Lannister; Francis Magee as Yoren; John Bradley as Samwell Tarly; Julian Glover as Grand Maester Pycelle; Peter Vaughan as Maester Aemon; Sibel Kekilli as Shae; David Bradley as Lord Walder Frey; Clive Mantle as Lord Jon "Greatjon" Umber; Wilko Johnson as Ser Ilyn Payne; Mark Stanley as Grenn; Josef Altin as Pypar; Luke McEwan as Rast; Mark Lewis Jones as Shagga; Mia Soteriou as Mirri Maz Duur; Amrita Acharia as Irri; Roxanne McKee as Doreah; Elyes Gabel as Rakharo; Dar Salim as Qotho; Ian Gelder as Ser Kevan Lannister; Jason Momoa as Khal Drogo

Episode chronology
← Previous "The Pointy End"	Next → "Fire and Blood"
- Game of Thrones season 1

"Baelor" is the ninth episode of the first season of the HBO medieval fantasy television series Game of Thrones. First aired on June 12, 2011, it was written by series creators and executive producers David Benioff and D. B. Weiss, and directed by Alan Taylor, his directorial debut for the series.

The plot depicts Ned Stark, imprisoned and accused of high treason, struggling with the decision whether to falsely confess to save his daughters, and he is ultimately beheaded at the order of King Joffrey Baratheon. Ned's wife Catelyn negotiates with Lord Walder Frey for the use of a strategic river crossing as their son Robb fights his first battle in the war against the Lannisters. Meanwhile, Jon Snow discovers a secret about Maester Aemon, and Daenerys Targaryen stands up to Dothraki soldier Qotho and challenges Dothraki traditions to care for Khal Drogo. The title refers to the statue under which Arya Stark watches her father Ned meet his fate.

The episode received great acclaim among critics, who praised the performances and cited the climactic scene with Ned's beheading as a highlight for the series, calling it a "daring, tragic finish". In the United States, the episode achieved a viewership of 2.66 million in its initial broadcast. The episode was nominated for an Emmy Award for Outstanding Writing for a Drama Series, and Peter Dinklage won the award for Outstanding Supporting Actor in a Drama Series for his performance as Tyrion Lannister.

This episode marks the final appearance of Sean Bean (Ned Stark).

== Plot ==
=== In Lhazar ===
Khal Drogo is weakened by his infected wound, and Jorah Mormont warns that if Drogo dies, his bloodriders will fight to be his successor and kill Daenerys Targaryen and her unborn child. Daenerys refuses to abandon her husband and encourages Mirri Maz Duur to use blood magic. She prepares a spell, warning that no one may enter the tent, and Jorah kills Qotho when he tries to intervene. Daenerys goes into premature labor, but the Dothraki midwives refuse to help. Desperate, Jorah carries Daenerys into Drogo's tent to seek Mirri's help.

=== At the Wall ===
Jeor Mormont gives Jon his ancestral Valyrian steel sword Longclaw. Jon is upset he cannot join Robb Stark against the Lannisters.

Maester Aemon reveals to Jon that he is Aemon Targaryen, the Mad King Aerys Targaryen's uncle and Daenerys's great-uncle, and advises Jon that the choice he must make between the Night's Watch and his family will haunt him for the rest of his life.

=== In the Riverlands ===
The Stark army reaches the Twins, a bridge stronghold controlled by Walder Frey, who agrees to allow the army to cross the river and to commit his troops in return for Robb and Arya marrying two of his children.

Tyrion suspects Tywin, who decides Tyrion and his barbarians will fight in the vanguard, wants him killed. As Tyrion, Bronn, and the prostitute Shae swap stories, Tyrion reveals he was married to a woman his father revealed was a prostitute, and made Tyrion watch as his guardsmen raped her.

As a Stark force approaches, Tyrion is trampled in the rush and regains consciousness to find the battle over. Tywin discovers the Stark host was only 2,000 men, not the 20,000 he expected.

Robb, having divided his forces, defeats Jaime Lannister's army with his remaining 18,000 men and captures Jaime.

=== In King's Landing ===
After Varys tells him that Sansa's life is also at stake, Ned agrees to make a false confession and swear loyalty to King Joffrey Baratheon.

Arya finds a crowd gathering to watch her father be judged, and climbs onto the statue of Baelor the Blessed. Ned notices Arya and alerts Night's Watch recruiter Yoren. Before Sansa, Cersei Lannister, Joffrey, and the Small Council, Ned confesses to treason and swears fealty to Joffrey. Instead of sparing Ned as promised, Joffrey orders him to be executed, much to everyone's, and especially Sansa's, horror. Seeing that Arya has been rescued by Yoren, Ned accepts his fate and is beheaded with his own sword, as a powerless Arya is taken to safety by Yoren.

== Production ==
=== Writing ===
The episode was written by the showrunners David Benioff and D. B. Weiss, based on the original book by George R. R. Martin.

The title of the episode refers to the Great Sept of Baelor, the main religious building in King's Landing, where the episode's pivotal scene takes place. In the world created by George R. R. Martin, Baelor I Targaryen was a king during a previous century, revered as a patron and supporter of the Faith of the Seven. "Baelor" includes the content of the book's chapters Eddard XV, Catelyn IX, Jon VIII, Tyrion VIII, Catelyn X, Daenerys VIII and Arya V (59–61 and 63–66).

The scene with the drinking game between Tyrion, Bronn and Shae was written specifically for the episode, but the story of Tyrion's ill-fated marriage to Tysha was taken from a previous chapter of the books. Shae's background was changed from Westerosi to foreign to accommodate Kekilli's accent. Other notable divergence from the books include the modification of the whole strategy of Robb Stark when dividing his forces, and a change to the Targaryen genealogy as explained by Maester Aemon: in the TV adaptation the Mad King is described as the son, rather than the grandson, of Aegon V (thus eliminating Jaehaerys II from the succession of kings).

=== Casting ===
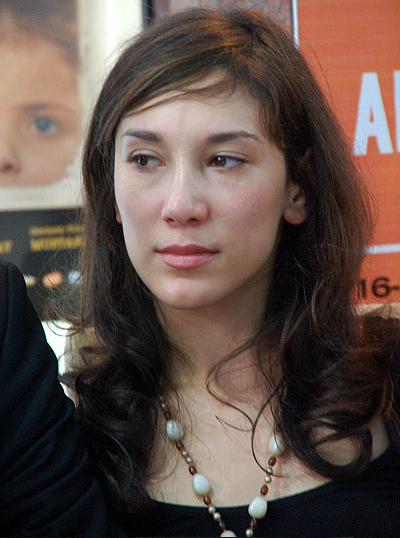
Sibel Kekilli plays the role of the prostitute Shae.

"Baelor" marks the first appearance of the German actress Sibel Kekilli, in the role of the prostitute Shae. Executive producer George R. R. Martin commented that she was extraordinary in her audition, in which she read the scene where Shae meets Tyrion in a tent the night before the battle of the Green Fork. According to Martin, "a lot of beautiful young women read for Shae. [...] But there's another dimension to Shae as well. She's not as practiced and hardened at this as a more seasoned pro. There's still a girl next door quality to her, a sense of vulnerability, playfulness, and, yes, innocence. [...] All of our Shaes were hot as hell. But only a handful of them captured that other quality, maybe three out of twenty, and Sibel was the standout. [...] Watching those auditions, any red-blooded male would want to take every one of our Shae candidates to bed. But Sibel made you fall in love with her as well."

Also introduced in this episode was the English actor David Bradley, playing the role of Walder Frey.

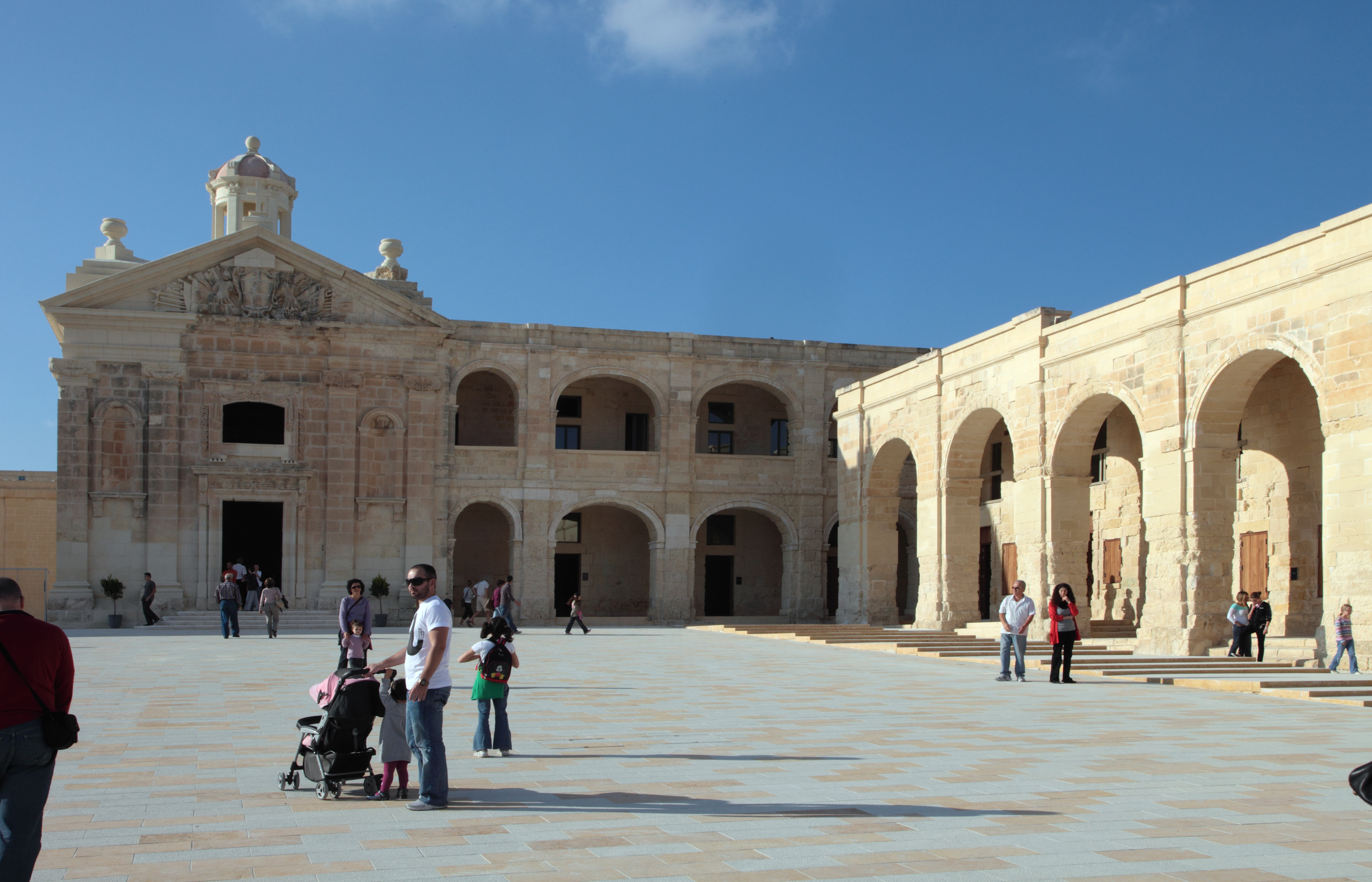
The scenes at the Great Sept of Baelor were filmed at Fort Manoel, in Malta.

=== Filming locations ===
Benioff and Weiss hired Alan Taylor to direct this episode because of his work in their favorite episodes from some great television shows, noting that Taylor was known for directing television episodes depicting the deaths of main characters like Julius Caesar in Rome, Wild Bill Hickok in Deadwood and Christopher Moltisanti in The Sopranos. They also admired Taylor's directing style, describing his shots as "cinematic and precise".

The interiors of the episode were filmed at the Paint Hall studios, close to Belfast. The area of the Castle Ward estate, also in Northern Ireland, was used to film on location the Stark and Lannister camps, the Crossing, and the battlefields of the Green Fork and the Whispering Woods.

The climactic scene before the Great Sept of Baelor was shot at Fort Manoel, in the Maltese town of Gżira. The filming took place in the last week of October 2010.

=== Execution ===
Years later, showrunner D. B. Weiss commented that the explicit style of the execution scene was selected in part to make it clear to the viewers that Eddard Stark, despite being the arguable protagonist of season one, actually was dead: "It’s that rule: 'If you don't see the body then they’re not really dead.' Like when we cut Ned’s head off, we didn’t want a gory Monty Python geyser of blood, but we needed to see the blade enter his neck and cut out on the frame where the blade was mid-neck. [...] we needed Ned's death to be totally unambiguous". Martin was satisfied with how Taylor pulled off Stark's execution, feeling that "the death of Ned Stark could not have been done better".

== Reception ==
=== Ratings ===
"Baelor" gathered 2.7 million viewers in its premiere telecast in the United States, equaling the season high reached with the previous week's episode. The total for the night, including the repeat, was slightly lower, with 3.4 million viewers. In the United Kingdom, the episode was viewed by 1.043 million viewers, making it the highest-rated broadcast that week.

=== Critical response ===
The episode received great acclaim among the critics. Review aggregator Rotten Tomatoes surveyed 19 reviews of the episode and judged 100% of them to be positive with an average score of 9.52 out of 10. The website's critical consensus reads, "Veering slightly from the source material, "Baelor" sports excellent performances and a bold, unprecedented climax." From the reviewers of The A.V. Club, where it was rated with an A, Emily VanDerWerff called it "unquestionably the finest episode of Game of Thrones yet," and David Sims found it "terrific" and with a conclusion that would be "sure to blow the minds (and break the hearts)" of the watchers. Matt Fowler of IGN gave the episode a perfect "10" saying that it was a "clean and epic entry with a daring, tragic finish" that had "an admirable undercurrent of audience contempt."

I didn't mention how masterfully directed—by Alan Taylor—that last scene was. The slow dolly in on Arya's face when Ned spots her. The careful establishment of the geography of the area. The way he lays out just who's where, so when shit hits the fan, you know what to expect. It's the biggest setpiece of book one, and he nails it, taking a scene that felt slightly distant and clinical on the page and making it visceral and real.

— Emily VanDerWerff, The A.V. Club

The focus of most reviews was in the climactic final scene, whose directing and acting is universally acclaimed by critics. Writing for Cultural Learnings, Myles McNutt stated: "the final shot, with Arya looking to the sky as everything goes to silence and all she sees is the birds flying was just wonderfully haunting. Alan Taylor's direction sold both the chaos and the resignation of that moment." HitFix's Alan Sepinwall felt that "that final scene was so gorgeously shot, and the weariness of Bean's performance and the horror of Maisie Williams' so perfectly conveyed the emotions of it, even as things seemed so chaotic."

The emotional charge of the scene hit home for many reviewers: Scott Meslow of The Atlantic called it "an absolutely nightmarish scene" and labelled Eddard's death "horrific in its indignity." Jace Lacob from Televisionary and Maureen Ryan from AOL TV admitted having shed tears at the episode's dramatic conclusion. The latter found the scene "masterful" and felt that the visual medium and Alan Taylor's excellent work had made it more powerful than the book's original version.

Besides the final scene, other aspects were discussed: Garcia noted the acting of Richard Madden and how the Freys had been introduced. Ryan praised the wide range of emotions used by Emilia Clarke while playing Daenerys, and how Peter Dinklage played Tyrion's frustration and confusion during the episode. Both she and McNutt were glad that Tyrion's exposition scene in the tent with Bronn and Shae did not use sex to keep viewers, as was done in past episodes.

There was debate about the merits of the producer's decision to avoid depicting the two battles between the Starks and Lannisters. Ryan criticized it and confessed being "a little disappointed that many of the major characters are caught up in a war and we're not seeing it." Sims regretted not seeing the fight, and although he said he understood the budget constrictions, he felt that "all this off-screen fighting is just getting my blood rushing for some on-screen fighting." Sepinwall concludes: "Ideally, we'd get a few epic, Braveheart-level battle scenes at some point, but I also respect the demands of time and budget here. Those kinds of sequences cost a fortune, and they eat up a lot of screen time, and I think ultimately I'd have rather had the time, say, that we spent in Tyrion's tent the night before the battle, with the mortifying story of his ex-wife, and then whatever it cost to make the execution sequence look as good as it did, than for the episode to have given us one or two long fight scenes."

In 2013, TV Guide ranked the final scene as the second greatest twist of all time.

==== Awards and nominations ====
Year	Award	Category	Nominee(s)	Result
2011	Primetime Emmy Awards	Outstanding Supporting Actor in a Drama Series	Peter Dinklage as Tyrion Lannister	Won
2011	Primetime Emmy Awards	Outstanding Writing for a Drama Series	David Benioff and D. B. Weiss	Nominated
2011	IGN Awards	Best TV Episode		Won
2011	IGN Awards	Best TV Twist		Won
2011	IGN People's Choice Awards	Best TV Episode		Nominated
2011	IGN People's Choice Awards	Best TV Twist		Won
2012	American Cinema Editors	Best Edited One-Hour Series for Non-Commercial Television	Frances Parker	Nominated
2012	Cinema Audio Society Awards	Outstanding Achievement in Sound Mixing – Television Series – One Hour	Ronan Hill, Mark Taylor	Nominated
