= A Golden Crown =

- Game of Thrones episode
- Episode no.: Season 1 Episode 6
- Directed by: Daniel Minahan
- Story by: David Benioff; D. B. Weiss
- Teleplay by: Jane Espenson; David Benioff; D. B. Weiss
- Cinematography by: Matthew Jensen
- Editing by: Martin Nicholson
- Original air date: May 22, 2011
- Running time: 52 minutes

Guest appearances
- Jerome Flynn as Bronn; Ron Donachie as Ser Rodrik Cassel; Ian McElhinney as Ser Barristan Selmy; Finn Jones as Ser Loras Tyrell; Kate Dickie as Lady Lysa Arryn; Julian Glover as Grand Maester Pycelle; Gethin Anthony as Renly Baratheon; Emun Elliott as Marillion; Miltos Yerolemou as Syrio Forel; Ciaran Bermingham as Mord; Susan Brown as Septa Mordane; Natalia Tena as Osha; Lino Facioli as Lord Robin Arryn; Esmé Bianco as Ros; Amrita Acharia as Irri; Roxanne McKee as Doreah; Kristian Nairn as Hodor; Brendan McCormack as Ser Vardis Egen; Elyes Gabel as Rakharo; Dar Salim as Qotho; Eugene Simon as Lancel Lannister; David Michael Scott as Ser Beric Dondarrion; Jason Momoa as Khal Drogo

Episode chronology
← Previous "The Wolf and the Lion"	Next → "You Win or You Die"
- Game of Thrones season 1

"A Golden Crown" is the sixth episode of the first season of the HBO medieval fantasy television series Game of Thrones. The teleplay was written by Jane Espenson and series creators David Benioff and D.B. Weiss from a story by Benioff and Weiss, and directed by Daniel Minahan, his directorial debut for the series. It first aired on May 22, 2011.

The episode's plot depicts the deterioration of the political balance of the Seven Kingdoms, with Ned Stark having to deal with the Lannister aggressions while King Robert Baratheon is away on a hunt. At the Eyrie, Tyrion Lannister is put on trial, and across the Narrow Sea, Viserys Targaryen is determined to force Khal Drogo to make him king.

The episode was well received by critics, who praised aspects of the King's Landing storyline and the culmination of Viserys's storyline. In the United States, the episode achieved a viewership of 2.4 million in its initial broadcast.

This episode marks the final appearance of Harry Lloyd (Viserys Targaryen).

== Plot ==
=== In King's Landing ===
Cersei Lannister accuses Ned Stark of kidnapping Tyrion, and Robert Baratheon tells Ned he cannot rule if the Lannisters and Starks are at war, appointing Ned regent while Robert leaves on a hunting trip.

Arya Stark continues her sword lessons with Syrio Forel, while her sister, Sansa, accepts an apology and a necklace from Crown Prince Joffrey Baratheon, unaware his mother has forced him.

In Robert's absence, Ned learns that Gregor "the Mountain" Clegane was seen attacking villages in the Riverlands. Realizing this is revenge for Tyrion's arrest, Ned orders Lord Beric Dondarrion to arrest the Mountain and summons his overlord Tywin Lannister to answer for Gregor's actions. Fearing war with the Lannisters, Ned orders Arya and Sansa to return to Winterfell for their safety. Sansa declares her desire to have golden-haired babies with Joffrey, which leads Ned to revisit Arryn's research: Joffrey does not share the dark hair of Robert and his ancestors and bastards; Ned realizes that Joffrey is not truly Robert's son.

=== In the Vale ===
Tyrion convinces Lysa to convene a court, where he mockingly confesses to various misdeeds but not the attempt on Bran Stark's life or Arryn's murder. Tyrion demands a trial by combat, and the sellsword Bronn volunteers to fight for him. Bronn "dishonorably" defeats Lysa's champion, and Tyrion goes free with Bronn as his escort, to Lysa Arryn and Catelyn Stark's dismay.

=== At Winterfell ===
Bran awakens from a recurring dream of a three-eyed raven and tests his new saddle in the forest. He is rescued from wildlings by Robb Stark and Theon Greyjoy, who take the only survivor, Osha, captive.

=== In Vaes Dothrak ===
Daenerys Targaryen is left unscathed after taking one of her dragon eggs from the fire. She undergoes a ritual with the Dosh Khaleen, eating a stallion's raw heart and proclaiming her unborn son will be the prophesied khal who unites the world as one khalasar. She names him Rhaego for Khal Drogo and her deceased brother, Rhaegar Targaryen, killed by Robert. Viserys, angry at his sister's growing popularity among the Dothraki, tries to steal Daenerys's dragon eggs to fund a new army; he is confronted and stopped by Jorah Mormont.

A drunken Viserys threatens his sister at swordpoint, and Drogo agrees to give him the "golden crown" he desires. The bloodriders restrain Viserys, as he desperately begs Dany not to let them kill him. Drogo tosses a pile of jewelry into a pot and melts it down before gifting Vicerys a “crown fit for a king” pouring the molten gold over the head of Vicerys, killing him instantly. Daenerys coldly remarks, "He was no dragon. Fire cannot kill a dragon."

== Production ==
=== Writing ===
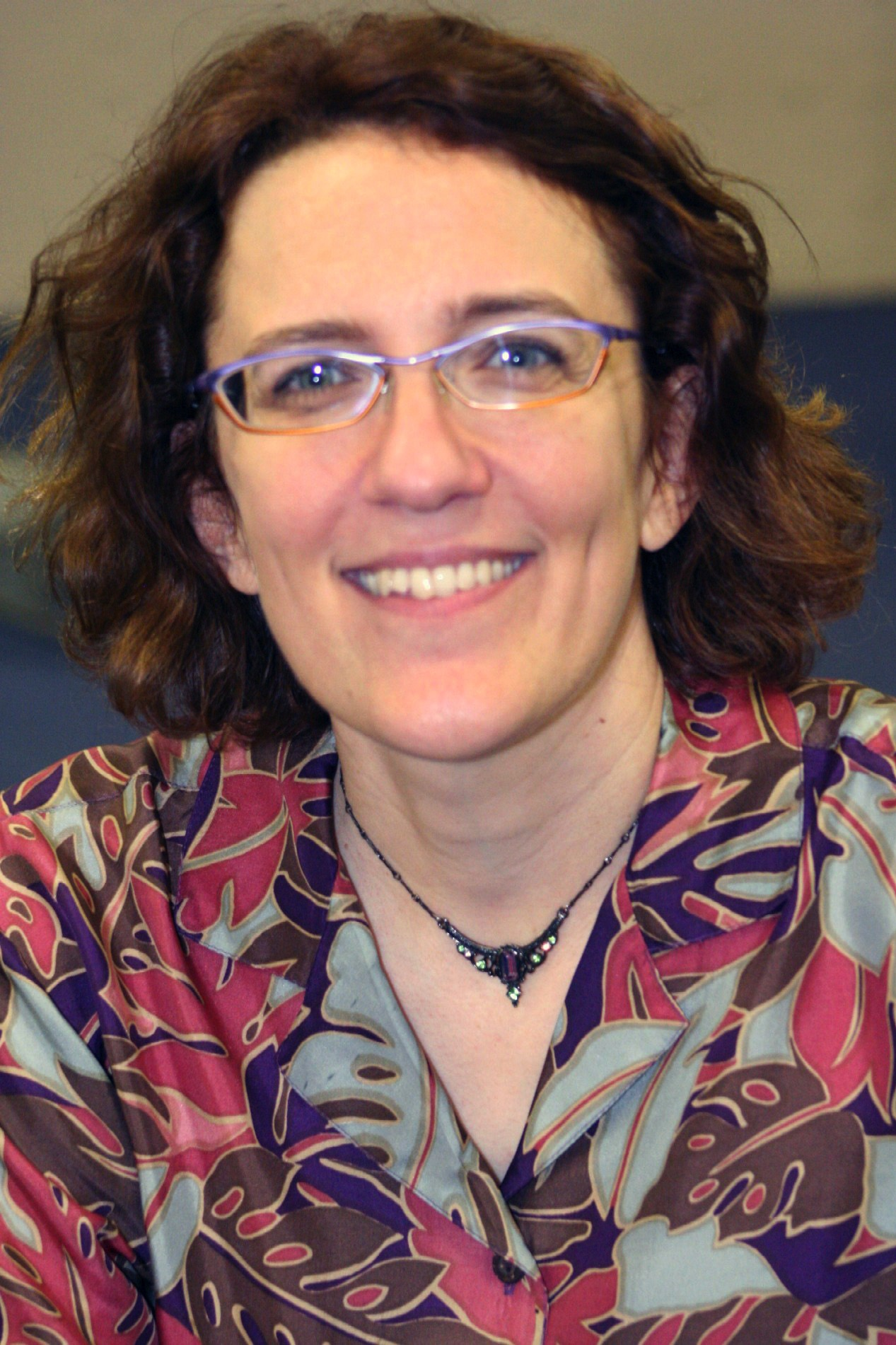
Jane Espenson received a co-credit on the teleplay of the episode.

The teleplay for "A Golden Crown" was written by Jane Espenson, David Benioff and D. B. Weiss from a story by Benioff and Weiss, based on A Game of Thrones by George R. R. Martin. The finished teleplay would be Espenson's only credited writing contribution to the series.

The episode includes the book's chapters 38–41, 44-45 and 47 (Bran V, Tyrion V, Eddard X, Catelyn VII, Eddard XI, Sansa III, and Daenerys V). Chapter 42 (Jon V), dealing with Jon convincing Maester Aemon to allow Samwell to join the Watch as a steward, was removed from the series (although some of Ser Alliser's dialogue from the chapter was used), and chapter 43 (Tyrion VI) was moved to episode 8.

=== Casting ===
The episode introduces the recurring character of the wildling Osha. The writer of the original books, George R. R. Martin, admitted that this casting was different from his vision of the character. As he explains, he was surprised to see that actress Natalia Tena was being considered for the role since Osha had been conceived as a hard-bitten older woman and the actress was "too young and too hot". However, when he saw the audition tapes he was convinced with the new approach: "she was sensational, and I said, 'It's gotta be her.'"

=== Staging and props ===
The scene in which Daenerys has to eat a horse's heart was filmed in The Paint Hall studio in Belfast. There, the production built the Dothraki temple in which the scene is set – a large semicircular structure of wood and woven reeds, inspired by Marsh Arab constructions. The heart actress Emilia Clarke ate was, according to Weiss, "basically a giant, three-pound gummi bear covered in fake sugar blood – which has the added attraction of drawing real flies". Through repeated takes, Clarke had to eat much of the fake heart, which she said tasted like bleach and was made tough and gristly by the addition of valves made from "something like dried pasta". Clarke did not have to act in the shots at the end of the scene in which Daenerys almost throws up the last bit of heart, as she was already close to vomiting at that point.

The book of lineages that helps Ned realize the truth about Joffrey's father was prepared by Bryan Cogman, who in addition to writing episode four ("Cripples, Bastards, and Broken Things") also served as the show's "lore master" and authored the background content concerning the history of Westeros that is to be included in the first season's DVD and Blu-ray release. Cogman wrote two pages' worth of text detailing the lineage of four noble houses. The text concerning House Umber was shown in episode four, and the Baratheon text appears in episode six. Cogman also wrote text for the houses of Targaryen and Royce, but the corresponding scenes were removed from the final script for "Cripples, Bastards, and Broken Things" but the Targaryen page was shown in "A Golden Crown". Cogman said that he drew on the novels and the fan-created website Wiki of Ice and Fire for reference, and invented what could not be sourced, including even some Internet fan message board names as in-jokes.

== Reception ==
=== Ratings ===
For the first time since the premiere of the show the ratings decreased in relation to the previous weeks. The first airing brought 2.4 million viewers, compared to the 2.6 million gathered by the previous episode. With the second airing the differences shrank, bringing the total of the night to 3.2 million, one hundred thousand viewers below the previous week's 3.3.

=== Critical response ===
"A Golden Crown" received positive reviews from critics. Review aggregator Rotten Tomatoes surveyed 18 reviews of the episode and judged 100% of them to be positive with an average score of 8.92 out of 10. The website's critical consensus reads, "The character-focused "A Golden Crown" highlights Game of Throne's cast to exhilarating effect, with particularly entertaining comic relief courtesy of Peter Dinklage's Tyrion." Emily VanDerWerff from the A.V. Club gave it an A−, and Maureen Ryan from AOL TV rated it with a 70 out of 100. HitFix's Alan Sepinwall titled his review "The rules get upended in a terrific episode." Both Elio Garcia from Westeros.org and Jace Lacob from Televisionary considered it the best episode of the series so far. In the words of reviewer Jace Lacob, the episode "revolves around changes both great and small, about the way the scales can fall from our eyes and we can see the truth that has been standing in front of us for so long. For Eddard, it's a realization of just why Jon Arryn died, of the terrible secret he had gleaned from the book of royal lineages, and just what this could mean for the throne...and for the Seven Kingdoms of Westeros. For Dany, it's the brutal truth of her brother's real nature, of his insatiable thirst for power and the twisted quality of his rampant heart."

The Dothraki scenes that culminate with the "crowning" of Viserys Targaryen was acclaimed by critics. Writing for Time, James Poniewozik highlighted an acting of "touching self-recognition by Harry Lloyd, who did an outstanding job humanizing a villain," and Maureen Ryan congratulated the actor for his "excellent job of showing the human side of this impetuous, cruel aristocrat" and "keeping Viserys just this side of sane in all his scenes." The acting of Emilia Clarke, closing her arc initiated in the first episode from a frightened girl to an empowered woman was also praised. VanDerWerff commented on the difficulty to adapt such an evolution from page to screen, but concluded that "Clarke and Lloyd more than seal the deal here." IGN's Matt Fowler also praised Clarke and noted that Daenerys's choice to watch Viserys die was "powerful" and an important shift in her character.

Another aspect of the show that was widely discussed among commentators was the moral dilemma presented in the episode between a pragmatic approach to ruling or remaining true to the ideals of justice and honor, exemplified in the scene where Eddard summons Tywin Lannister to the court to answer for the crimes of his bannerman Gregor Clegane. Poniewozik states that Eddard "doesn't seem to consider that he has options: he is left to rule in the king's place, an injustice has been committed, the law requires one path to justice and he chooses it. This makes his decision easy, but it may make his life, and others', difficult." According to The Atlantic's Scott Meslow, "Ned's principles are, as always, admirable, and he's clearly interested in justice. But the sad truth is that the lack of guile that makes him honorable also makes him a pretty poor king. It's a terrible idea to order the arrest of the man who is single-handedly financing your kingdom." Myles McNutt, writing for Cultural Learnings, agreed with Meslow and concluded that "the only thing more dangerous than a reckless man asserting their power in Westeros is an honorable man doing the same, as it threatens the delicate framework which has propped up King Robert for so long."

=== Accolades ===
Year	Award	Category	Nominee(s)	Result	Ref.
2011	Primetime Creative Arts Emmy Awards	Outstanding Hairstyling for a Single-Camera Series	Kevin Alexander and Candice Banks	Nominated	
2011	Primetime Creative Arts Emmy Awards	Outstanding Prosthetic Makeup for a Series, Miniseries, Movie or a Special	Paul Engelen, Conor O'Sullivan, and Rob Trenton	Nominated	
2011	Primetime Creative Arts Emmy Awards	Outstanding Sound Editing for a Comedy or Drama Series (One-Hour)	Robin Quinn, Steve Fanagan, Eoghan McDonnell, Jon Stevenson, Tim Hands, Stefan Henrix, Caoimhe Doyle, Michelle McCormack and Andy Kennedy	Nominated	
2012	ADG Excellence in Production Design Award	One-Hour Single Camera Television Series	Gemma Jackson	Nominated	
