= The Wolf and the Lion =

- Game of Thrones episode
- Episode no.: Season 1 Episode 5
- Directed by: Brian Kirk
- Written by: David Benioff; D. B. Weiss
- Cinematography by: Marco Pontecorvo
- Editing by: Frances Parker
- Original air date: May 15, 2011
- Running time: 54 minutes

Guest appearances
- Donald Sumpter as Maester Luwin; Conleth Hill as Lord Varys; Jamie Sives as Jory Cassel; Ron Donachie as Rodrik Cassel; Jerome Flynn as Bronn; Francis Magee as Yoren; Ian McElhinney as Ser Barristan Selmy; Kate Dickie as Lysa Arryn; Julian Glover as Grand Maester Pycelle; Gethin Anthony as Renly Baratheon; Roger Allam as Magister Illyrio; Emun Elliott as Marillion; Finn Jones as Loras Tyrell; Conan Stevens as Gregor Clegane; Ciaran Birmingham as Mord; Susan Brown as Septa Mordane; Esmé Bianco as Ros; Jefferson Hall as Hugh of the Vale; Lino Facioli as Robin Arryn; Brendan McCormack as Vardis Egen; Eugene Simon as Lancel Lannister; Callum Wharry as Tommen Baratheon; Aimee Richardson as Myrcella Baratheon

Episode chronology
← Previous "Cripples, Bastards, and Broken Things"	Next → "A Golden Crown"
- Game of Thrones season 1

"The Wolf and the Lion" is the fifth episode of the first season of the HBO medieval fantasy television series Game of Thrones, first aired on May 15, 2011. It was written by series creators and executive producers David Benioff and D. B. Weiss, and directed by Brian Kirk.

The events of the episode primarily deal with Ned Stark's investigations into the death of the previous Hand. In the city of King's Landing, the Tourney of the Hand comes to an end while the various factions that plot for power are revealed to the viewer. This delicate balance is undone when news arrives that Tyrion Lannister has been arrested by Catelyn Stark. The title of the episode refers to the fact that the Starks, whose sigil is a wolf, may soon be at war with the Lannisters, whose sigil is the lion.

With this episode, the season hits its halfway mark and the action picks up considerably. Despite being a topic of discussion at King's Landing, Daenerys and Jorah Mormont do not themselves appear in this episode. Jon Snow and all characters on the Wall are also absent, and Robb Stark does not appear in Winterfell scenes. The Eyrie appears as a new location between King's Landing and Winterfell on the opening's map.

The episode was also particularly well-received critically, with multiple critics declaring it to be the best episode of the show so far and giving large praise to the episode's pacing and the omission of the Wall and Dothraki plotlines, giving this episode a relatively more focused feel. In the United States, the episode achieved a viewership of 2.58 million in its initial broadcast.

== Plot ==
=== At Winterfell ===
Theon Greyjoy grows jealous of Tyrion Lannister after his favorite prostitute, Ros, taunts him. To take Bran Stark's mind off his paralysis and his mother's departure, Maester Luwin suggests that Bran learn the art of Dothraki horseback archery.

=== In the Vale ===
Catelyn Stark leads her entourage east through the Mountains of the Moon to the Vale, with her prisoner, Tyrion. Barbarians attack them, and Tyrion saves Catelyn. Arriving at the Eyrie, ruled by Jon Arryn's widow, Lysa, Catelyn's psychologically unstable sister, Catelyn meets her eight-year-old nephew Robin, whom Lysa still breastfeeds. Tyrion is consigned to the Eyrie's "sky cells" while Lysa prepares to pass judgment on him as an accomplice in her husband's murder.

=== In King's Landing ===
After Ned Stark convinces Robert Baratheon not to join the tourney, the crowd watches Gregor "the Mountain" Clegane joust with Ser Loras Tyrell, the "Knight of Flowers", who wins by riding a mare in heat, distracting the Mountain's stallion. The Mountain beheads his horse and attempts to kill Loras, but Sandor "the Hound" Clegane, the Mountain's brother, intervenes.

Varys reveals to Ned that Jon Arryn was killed by a poison called the "Tears of Lys" and suggests that Arryn's slain squire, Ser Hugh of the Vale, was the poisoner. In training, Arya Stark chases a cat through the Red Keep and overhears a conversation between Varys and Illyrio, who appear to be plotting against the throne. Arya tries to warn her father but is unable to identify the plotters. Yoren, a Night's Watch recruiter, informs Ned of Catelyn's arrest of Tyrion.

News of Daenerys Targaryen's pregnancy reaches the Small Council. Fearing an invasion by the Targaryen–Dothraki alliance, Robert orders that Daenerys and her unborn child, along with Viserys III Targaryen, be assassinated. Ned refuses and resigns as Hand of the King. As Robert drinks in sorrow, Cersei Lannister visits him and they talk about the serious threat the Dothraki pose and their failed marriage. Renly Baratheon is convinced by Loras, his lover, that he should be king instead.

Petyr "Littlefinger" Baelish reveals to Ned that Arryn was searching for Robert's bastards. Ned is ambushed by Jaime Lannister, who claims responsibility for Tyrion's arrest, leading to a brutal fight; Ned's guards are killed, including Captain Jory Cassel. Ned duels Jaime, but one of Jaime's men spears Ned through the leg from behind. Jaime lets Ned live, demanding his brother's return.

== Production ==
=== Writing ===
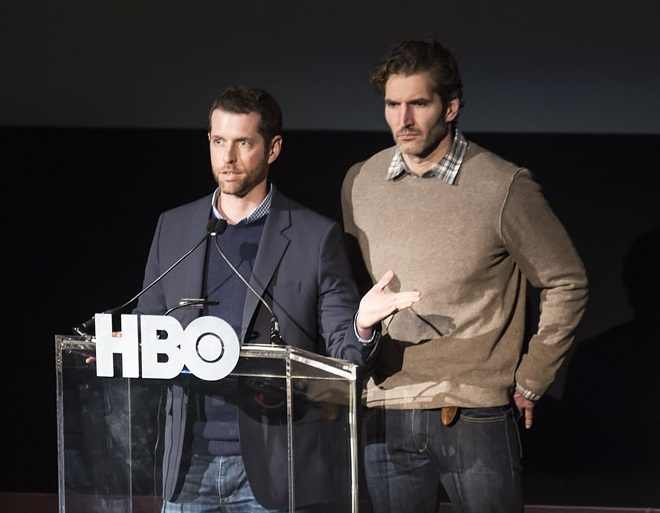
The episode was written by series co-creators David Benioff and D. B. Weiss.

"The Wolf and the Lion" was written by the show creators and executive producers David Benioff and D. B. Weiss, based on the book by George R. R. Martin. The episode includes chapters 31 to 36 of the book (Eddard VII, Tyrion IV, Arya III, Eddard VIII, Catelyn VI, and Eddard IX).

The adaptation to the screen has continued with the trend of including new scenes to flesh out characters that in the book are only superficially seen through the point of view characters. These include the dialectical confrontation between Littlefinger and Varys, and the conversation between King Robert and Queen Cersei, and the young lovers Renly and Loras. The show's writers used this opportunity to make explicit Loras and Renly's ongoing assignations, which were only hinted at in the books.

=== Casting ===
Finn Jones makes his first appearance as Ser Loras Tyrell, the young jouster known as "The Knight of Flowers". The casting was one of the first to be announced, being confirmed by author George R. R. Martin in June 2010 after it had been leaked before the contract was to be signed. The actor had initially been considered for the role of Jon Snow when the pilot was being filmed.

The new location of the court is also introduced: Scottish actress Kate Dickie was cast as the Lady of the Eyrie, Lysa Arryn, also making her first appearance in this episode. Although Dickie does not resemble the physical description of Lysa given in the books, Martin stated that her acting in the auditions was excellent. The role of her son (renamed Robin in the series to avoid confusion with King Robert) went to Lino Facioli, and the knight of the Vale Ser Vardis Egen was played by Brendan McCormack.

Lingerie model Emily Diamond has a role as a prostitute who teases Jory Cassel during the visit to the brothel. Diamond was initially hired as a body double to one of the main stars, but the producers liked her so much that they decided to give her a role. Also appearing in this episode is the casting team's Robert Sterne, who reprises his cameo role as a page in King's Landing.

=== Filming locations ===
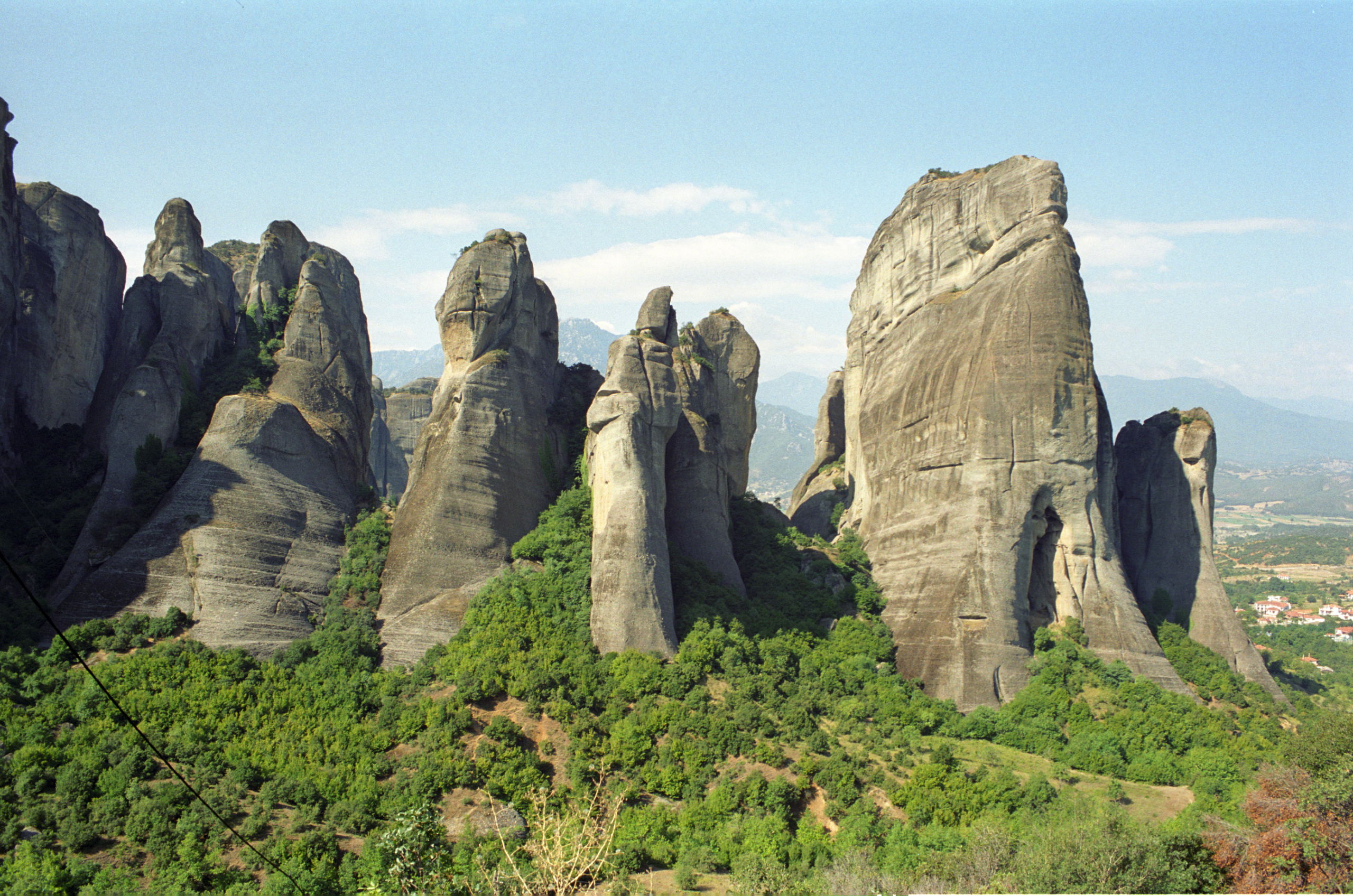
Images of Meteora were used for the composite views of the Vale.

The interiors for the episode were filmed at The Paint Hall studio. The conclusion of the Tourney of the Hand that had begun in the previous episode continued to be filmed in Shane's Castle. Production moved to Malta to film many King's Landing exteriors: the dungeons of the Red Keep where Arya is lost while chasing cats were the dungeons of Fort St Angelo, in the Maltese town of Vittoriosa.

For the CGI compositions of the Vale of Arryn, as seen in the establishing shot of the Eyrie and from the sky cells, the visual effects team used images and textures from the Greek rock formations of Meteora. Initially they had been considering the Zhangjiajie Mountains in China, but because the landscape base plates were being shot in Ireland, using Meteora was a better option.

=== Choreography ===
In keeping with the transition of the series from exposition to action, each episode shows more fight scenes, and "The Wolf and the Lion" has a large number that had to be choreographed. Fight co-ordinator Buster Reeves designed all the moves and then taught the cast how to make them and give a sense of real aggression. Reeves commented on the ambush by the Hill men as one of the most difficult as he had to show many people fighting on screen at the same time making every one look original and exciting, and also noting how intimidating it could be for the actors to have 20 stuntmen running through their midst with axes and swords.

=== Dedication ===
The episode is dedicated "to the memory of Caroline Lois Benoist," a 26-year-old animal trainer who had been working on the production for six months, mainly training the dogs that doubled as the series' direwolves. She fell ill at her home on 18 December 2010, a few days after filming had finished, and died on 29 December from swine flu.

== Reception ==
=== Ratings ===
The episode's viewership increased to 2.58 million for its first airing, continuing the increasing trend of the last weeks. Combined with its encore, the show was up to 3.3 million viewers for the night.

=== Critical response ===
"The Wolf and the Lion" was met with highly positive reception by the critics of the show, and many regarded it as the best episode yet. Review aggregator Rotten Tomatoes surveyed 21 reviews of the episode and judged 95% of them to be positive with an average score of 9.35 out of 10. The website's critical consensus reads, "With "The Wolf and the Lion," Game of Thrones tightens its grip while ratcheting up the tension through powerful writing, terrific acting, and an evocative, immersive setting." Maureen Ryan of AOL TV gave it a 90 out of 100, noting the exceptional work by the cast and excellent writing. Both Emily VanDerWerff and David Sims, from The A.V. Club, rated the episode an "A."

Reviewers agreed that after four episodes presenting the setting and introducing the main characters, the story started to move forward faster and raise the stakes. David Sims considered it "the point at which all of the scheming and conversing and table-setting began to lumber forward and gain some real momentum." James Poniewozik wrote for Time that the episode "began to let the swords do the talking," and "while there were some very significant scenes of talk, the dialogue went beyond Westeros History 101 to take the story in some very interesting directions." IGN's Matt Fowler wrote that this was "the best episode of the series so far" even though fan-favorite characters like Jon Snow and Daenerys Targaryen did not appear.

Maureen Ryan believed that one of the reasons the episode worked so well was because it left out the storylines with the Night's Watch and the Dothraki and focused in a single location. VanDerWerff agreed, and added that with each episode the writers got bolder in the sense that they added new scenes not included in the book to round out the source material.

Other aspects of the show that were highlighted by the critics were the effectiveness of the action scenes and the visuals, especially the views of the Eyrie and its sky cells, and the dragon skulls.

=== Accolades ===
Year	Award	Category	Nominee(s)	Result	Ref.
2011	Primetime Creative Arts Emmy Awards	Outstanding Stunt Coordination	Paul Jennings	Nominated	
