= The Pointy End =

- Game of Thrones episode
- Khal Drogo fighting Mago, a Dothraki warrior. This scene was not in the original script.
- Episode no.: Season 1 Episode 8
- Directed by: Daniel Minahan
- Written by: George R. R. Martin
- Cinematography by: Matthew Jensen
- Editing by: Martin Nicholson
- Original air date: June 5, 2011
- Running time: 58 minutes

Guest appearances
- Donald Sumpter as Maester Luwin; Conleth Hill as Varys; Jerome Flynn as Bronn; James Cosmo as Ser Jeor Mormont; Owen Teale as Ser Alliser Thorne; Ron Donachie as Ser Rodrik Cassel; Charles Dance as Tywin Lannister; Ian McElhinney as Ser Barristan Selmy; John Bradley as Samwell Tarly; Julian Glover as Grand Maester Pycelle; Miltos Yerolemou as Syrio Forel; Kate Dickie as Lady Lysa Arryn; Dominic Carter as Janos Slynt; Natalia Tena as Osha; Susan Brown as Septa Mordane; Clive Mantle as Lord Jon "Greatjon" Umber; Mark Stanley as Grenn; Josef Altin as Pypar; Luke McEwan as Rast; Mark Lewis Jones as Shagga; Mia Soteriou as Mirri Maz Duur; Amrita Acharia as Irri; Roxanne McKee as Doreah; Kristian Nairn as Hodor; Elyes Gabel as Rakharo; Dar Salim as Qotho; Ian Gelder as Ser Kevan Lannister; Lino Facioli as Lord Robin Arryn; Art Parkinson as Rickon Stark; Brian Fortune as Othell Yarwyck; Jason Momoa as Khal Drogo

Episode chronology
← Previous "You Win or You Die"	Next → "Baelor"
- Game of Thrones season 1

"The Pointy End" is the eighth episode of the first season of the HBO medieval fantasy television series Game of Thrones. First aired on June 5, 2011, the episode was directed by Daniel Minahan and written by George R. R. Martin, the author of the A Song of Ice and Fire novels on which the show is based.

The plot covers the aftermath of Ned Stark's capture. While the Lannisters seek to capture his daughters, his son and heir, Robb, raises an army in the North. Meanwhile, Daenerys Targaryen witnesses a Dothraki raid on a peaceful village, and Jon Snow faces a new threat at the Wall. The episode's title refers to the sword fighting lesson that Jon gave to Arya Stark before their farewell: "Stick them with the pointy end".

The episode was well received by critics, who praised Martin's adaptation of his own work as well as the actors' performances, with Sophie Turner as Sansa Stark singled out for praise. It was dedicated to Ralph Vicinanza, an executive producer who died of natural causes. In the United States, the episode achieved a viewership of 2.72 million in its initial broadcast. The episode garnered an Emmy Award nomination for Outstanding Costumes for a Series, but lost to The Borgias.

== Plot ==
=== In the North ===
Upon receiving a letter from Sansa Stark, Maester Luwin deduces she is being manipulated by Cersei Lannister. Robb Stark gains the respect of Lord Greatjon Umber and calls the Stark bannermen to war, leaving his brother Bran in charge of Winterfell. Rickon Stark, the youngest, declares that Robb will not return.

=== In the Vale ===
Catelyn Stark learns from a message that Robb has called the banners of the North to war against the Lannisters and that Ned, her husband, is imprisoned in the dungeons in King's Landing. Catelyn becomes furious with Lysa Arryn, her sister, for not telling her, but nonetheless implores Lysa to help by sending the Knights of the Vale to join Robb, but Lysa, doubting that Robb can beat Tywin Lannister, refuses.

=== In the Riverlands ===
Ambushed by tribe members, Tyrion Lannister bribes them to escort him and Bronn to his father Tywin's camp. Tywin agrees to honor Tyrion's promises to the tribe members if they join the Lannister forces, and they demand Tyrion accompany them as insurance.

Catelyn reaches the Stark army. Pondering whether to attack Tywin's or Jaime Lannister's forces, Robb sends a captured Lannister scout with a message to Tywin, deceiving the scout into believing that Robb is sending all 20,000 men against Tywin.

=== At the Wall ===
Jon and Samwell Tarly return to the Wall with the corpses of Benjen's fellow rangers; although dead for weeks, they show no decay. Jeor Mormont informs Jon of events in the south but reminds him of his commitment to the Night's Watch. Jon tries to attack Thorne for mocking Ned and is confined to his quarters. That night, Ghost prompts Jon to investigate Mormont's quarters. A dead ranger attacks him, is returned to life as a wight, and he destroys it with fire. In the morning, the Night's Watch burns all the remains.

=== In Lhazar ===
Khal Drogo's khalasar sacks a Lhazareen village to gather funds for ships. As khaleesi, Daenerys Targaryen demands the raiders marry their captured women rather than enslave them, infuriating raider Mago. Drogo kills him in a duel but is wounded, and he reluctantly accepts village healer Mirri Maz Duur's treatment.

=== In King's Landing ===
The Lannisters detain Ned and Sansa. Cersei convinces Sansa to write to Robb, imploring him to come to King's Landing and swear fealty to Joffrey Baratheon. Joffrey and Cersei reward the City Watch captain with a lordship, naming Tywin the new Hand of the King and Jaime the new Lord Commander of the Kingsguard; the previous incumbent, Ser Barristan Selmy, is dismissed and leaves dismayed. Sansa pleads for her father's life, and Joffrey agrees to show mercy if Ned will confess to treason and accept him as the rightful king.

== Production ==
=== Writing ===
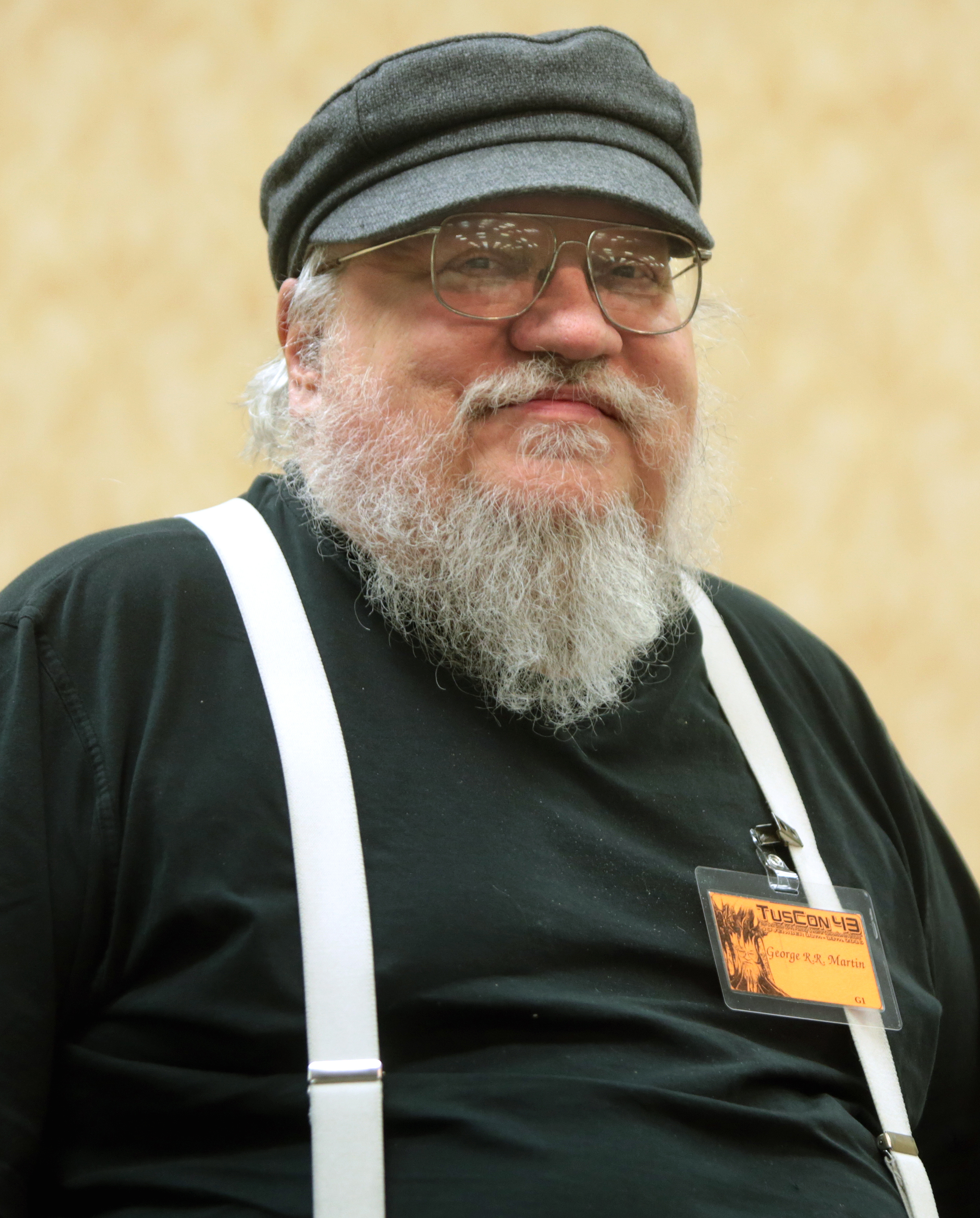
The episode was written by A Song of Ice and Fire author George R. R. Martin.

The episode was written by George R. R. Martin, the author of the book A Game of Thrones on which the series is based. Content from this episode is derived from chapters 43, 51–54, 55–58, and 61 (Tyrion VI, Arya IV, Sansa IV, Jon VII, Bran VI, Catelyn VIII, Tyrion VII, Sansa V, the early part of Eddard XV, and Daenerys VII). Martin has extensive experience in television writing, but it had been a decade since he had produced a teleplay. He said that he found writing this episode very easy because of his familiarity with the characters and the story, and that the hardest part was "getting used to the new screenwriting software that [he] had to use."

Martin delivered the first draft of the script to the show's executive producers David Benioff and D. B. Weiss on May 1, 2010, admitting that it was probably "too long and too expensive." In fact, one scene that Martin wrote – Robb Stark calling his father's Northern bannermen, with a montage of eight different castles receiving the summons and riding out – was deemed impossible to film.

The first scenes depicting Tyrion descending with Bronn from the Mountains of the Moon and encountering the clansmen were not written by Martin. Since they were originally intended to be part of episode seven, they were written by that episode's authors, David Benioff and D. B. Weiss. As often happens in TV production, the scene was moved from one episode to another during editing.

The scene where Drogo fights Mago was not in the original script, but Momoa suggested it after realizing that Drogo, supposedly a great warrior, had never had his fighting prowess shown onscreen.

=== Casting ===
"The Pointy End" includes the first appearance of two significant recurring characters in the book series: Clive Mantle as the Northern bannerman Lord Jon Umber, known as the Greatjon due to his size, and Ian Gelder as Lord Tywin's brother and right-hand man Ser Kevan Lannister.

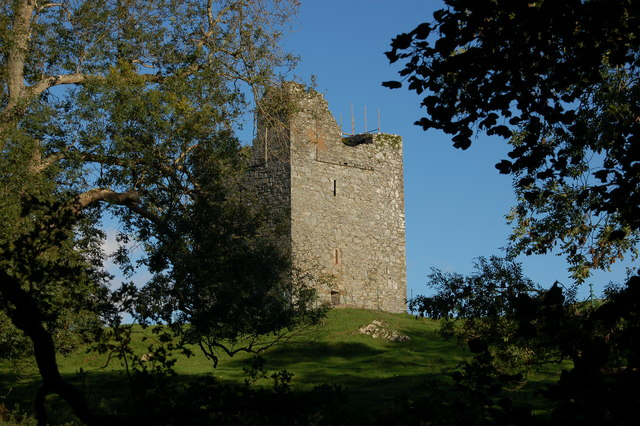
Audley's Castle was used as one of the ruined towers of Moat Cailin that defend the Neck.

=== Filming locations ===
Interior scenes were filmed at The Paint Hall studio, in Belfast, including all the scenes set in the Red Keep and Winterfell. The exterior of the Stark and Lannister war camps were shot on location in the Castle Ward estate, near the village of Strangford. Audley's Castle in the estate doubled as the ruined remains of one of Moat Cailin's towers, seen when Catelyn and Rodrik join Robb's army.

The scenes at the village of the Lamb Men that is sacked by the Dothraki were filmed towards the end of October 2010 in Malta, at the farming town of Manikata. For the exterior of the Red Keep where Arya recovers her sword Needle, San Anton Palace was used.

=== Dedication ===
The episode was dedicated to the memory of Ralph Vicinanza. He had been one of the co-executive producers attached to Game of Thrones, and died in his sleep from a cerebral aneurysm on September 25, 2010. Vicinanza was the literary agent who handled George R. R. Martin's foreign language rights, and (with Vince Gerardis) one of the co-founders of the management company Created By, which aimed at developing feature films and television shows based on the works of Vicinanza's clients. He was instrumental in bringing Martin's work to the screen, recommending the books to David Benioff and D. B. Weiss, and leading the negotiations with HBO. He died a few days after HBO greenlighted the series.

== Reception ==
=== Ratings ===
The episode was seen by 2.7 million viewers for the first airing, a season high, and by another additional 900,000 for the repeat. It therefore obtained a total audience of 3.6 million for the night.

=== Critical response ===
"The Pointy End" was well received by critics. Among the most enthusiastic was Maureen Ryan from AOL TV, who called it "the best episode yet," and wrote that she was "extremely impressed with how many moving parts were deployed smoothly and how the hour just flowed." Review aggregator Rotten Tomatoes surveyed 18 reviews of the episode and judged 100% of them to be positive with an average score of 9.25 out of 10. The website's critical consensus reads, ""The Pointy End" is a fast-paced transitional episode which, though written by source novelist George R.R. Martin, proves the show is now finding its own way as a separate entity from the books." IGN's Matt Fowler remarked that this mostly Ned-less episode was very busy; he enjoyed that Robb got to share the spotlight as viewers witnessed part of his "maturation."

The episode's multiple perspectives were commented on: James Hibberd wrote for Entertainment Weekly that "for a show that can often seem disjointed due by having so many storylines unfolding in different locations, this was the most cohesive episode we've seen yet, as the entire realm was impacted by Ned Stark being arrested for treason." At HitFix, Alan Sepinwall called it "by far the busiest episode of the series to date," remarking that it not only moved "pieces around the chess board to set things up for the season's final two episodes," but also included "some crackling dialogue, a few good character moments and some of the best action the show has featured to date." David Sims from the A.V. Club wrote that the episode "masterfully kept us abreast of everything going on, while sticking to the point-of-view style the show has held from the start." On his blog Cultural Learnings, reviewer Myles McNutt found the episode "filled with moments where much is done with very little. We don't really spend a sustained period in any one location, with only brief scenes possible to establish some pretty substantial story developments."

"There was a level of sureness and confidence on display in this script, and that makes a whole lot of sense, given that Martin invented this world and created these people. There was no tentativeness when it came to shaping and adapting the material for the small screen. There have been standout scenes in other episodes, and the show has certainly gained confidence and momentum as the season has progressed, but 'The Pointy End' was just on a different level. I loved it."

— Maureen Ryan, AOL TV

Many critics considered that a great part of the episode's merits were due to George R. R. Martin's script. Sepinwall felt that "Martin didn't get the easiest draw when he wound up having to dramatize the events depicted in 'The Pointy End,'" but still loved the results. Mo Ryan concluded that anyone who was doubting whether Martin had forgotten about writing television scripts should now put their doubts to rest. The "expert" review from the A.V. Club by Emily VanDerWerff noted "a definite sense of Martin's hand at work here. Characters that have never quite worked onscreen—like Sansa—suddenly feel much more alive. Characters that have been working—like Tyrion and Arya—get lots of fun stuff to play that never once feels labored."

The scenes with Sansa Stark were also noted. According to Elio Garcia from westeros.org, "Sophie Turner really shines in her scenes. There are a lot of people out there who judge Sansa very harshly, but you would have to have a heart of stone not to sympathize with her plight in this episode." Many reviewers agreed with this sentiment, commenting on the transition from a "spoiled brat" to a young, confused, but courageous teenager were noted by several reviewers positively. Time's reviewer James Poniewozik emphasized the growth of Robb Stark's character, praising both Martin's writing and Richard Madden's acting. Maureen Ryan highlighted the scene where Syrio Forel confronts the Lannister men to allow Arya's escape, which she considered masterfully staged.

==== Awards and nominations ====
Year	Award	Category	Nominee(s)	Result	Ref.
2011	Primetime Creative Arts Emmy Awards	Outstanding Costumes for a Series	Michele Clapton and Rachael Webb-Crozier	Nominated	
