= Audley's Castle =

Irish Norman ruined tower castle

Coordinates: 54°22′46.50″N 5°34′19″W

- Strangford, County Down, Northern Ireland
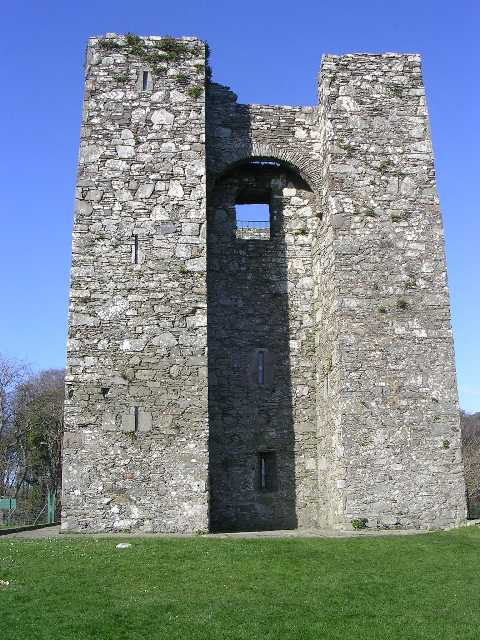
- Audley's Castle

Site information
- Type: Castle

Site history
- Built: 15th century
- Materials: Stone

Audley's Castle is a 15th-century castle located 1 mile (1.6 km) north-east of Strangford, County Down, Northern Ireland, on a rocky height overlooking Strangford Lough. It is a three-storey Tower house named after its 16th century owner, John Audley. Audley's Castle tower house and bawn is a State Care Historic Monument in the townland of Castleward, in Down District Council area, at grid ref: J5781 5058.

There are thousands of small stone towers similar to Audley's Castle in the Irish countryside. They are one of the commonest of archaeological sites, which indicates these were not buildings put up for the higher aristocracy, but for lesser lords and gentry. Most were built in the late Middle Ages (roughly 1350–1550). Audley's was built towards the end of this period.

== Features ==
Audley's Castle consists of a tower set within a yard (technically known as a bawn) which is enclosed by a thin wall, with a simple gate.

The tower has one main room on each floor, with one or two subsidiary rooms off each of the big ones. The ground floor has small windows and no fireplace or latrine and was for storage of provisions. The first floor has better windows, a large fireplace and access to a latrine; this was a room for the owner to live in and entertain his friends. It also has a chute for throwing dirty water away, so the large fireplace was also probably used for cooking on. The second floor was probably the lord's private room for sleeping and his family life: servants and others could be accommodated in the attic.

There is very little historical information about the buildings in the small courtyard around Audley's. Only a minority of towers had courtyard walls at all, and their buildings were clearly less important than the tower. The towers in different parts of the country vary, with distinct regional patterns. Audley's with its two turrets linked by an arch is one of a type found in County Down only.

== History ==
Audley castle is a ruin which once stood as a tower constructed in the 15th century which now lies on the ground of Castle Ward, owned by Viscount Bangor. The area was established by the Irish Normans, and given to a knight named John de Courcy in 1177. In 1646 the castle was bought by the Ward family and a 3-story tower castle was built and named after John Audley. Nearby was a town named Audleystown, until the locals were sent to America by the Ward family in the 1850s. The castle is now a public park

=== Filming location ===
During the filming of the TV series Game of Thrones, the castle ruins were twice used as a set, once for an encampment at the scenes for the 'battle of camps'. And another as a backdrop to the Twins', Frey residence in the 'Red wedding' in season 3, episode 9.

== Gallery ==
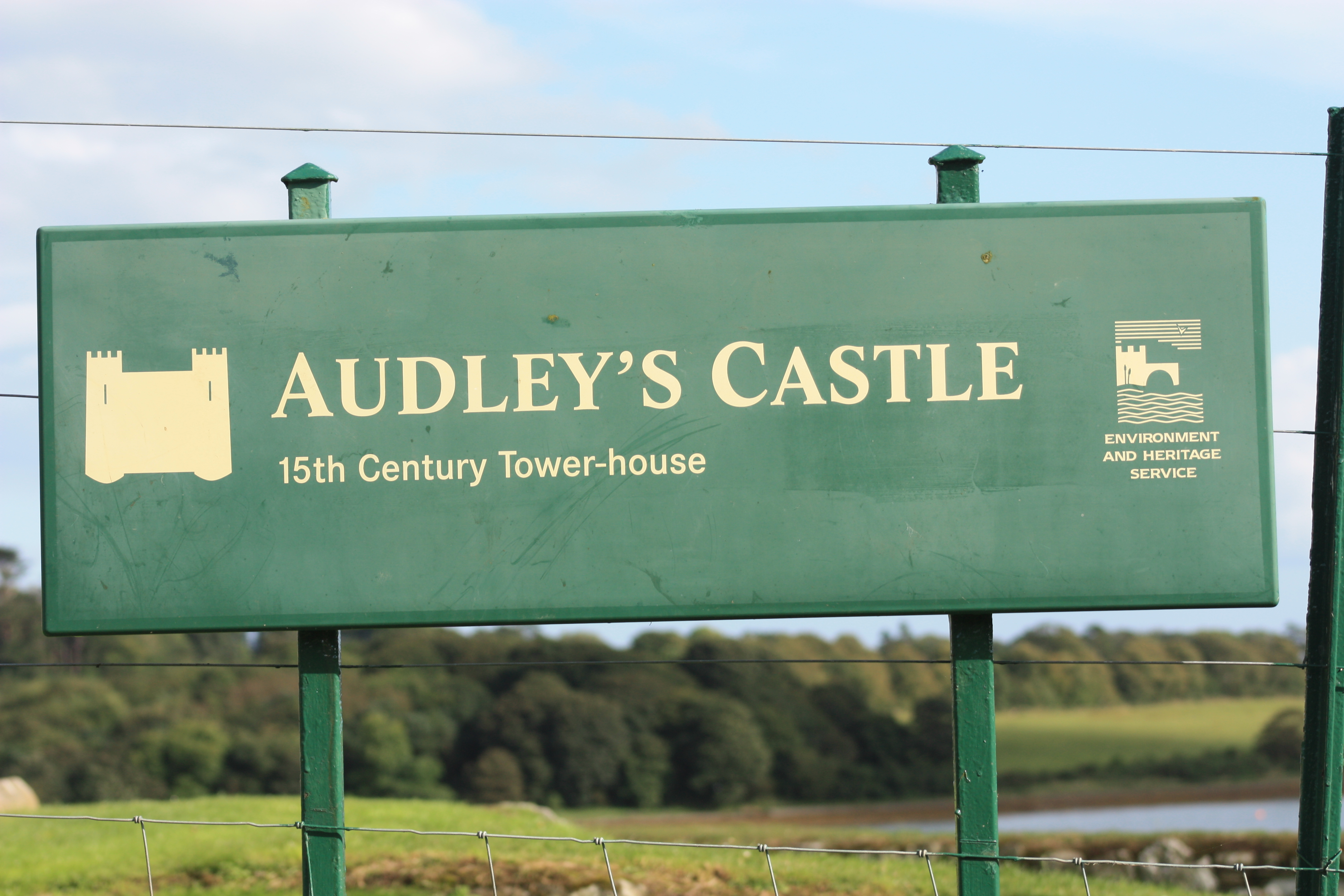
Audley's Castle, August 2009

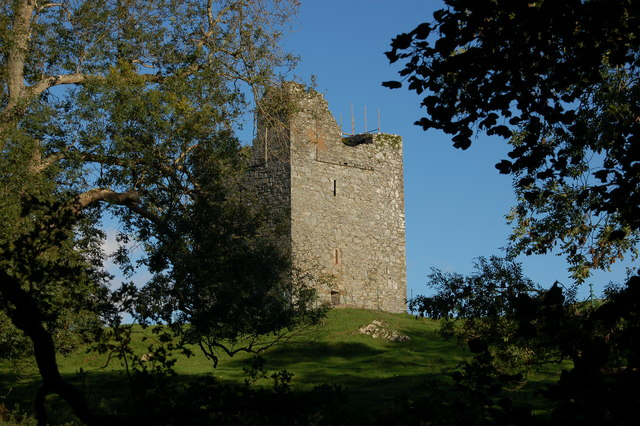
Audley's Castle

== See also ==
- List of castles in Ireland
