= Jorah Mormont =

Character in A Song of Ice and Fire

- A Song of Ice and Fire character Game of Thrones character
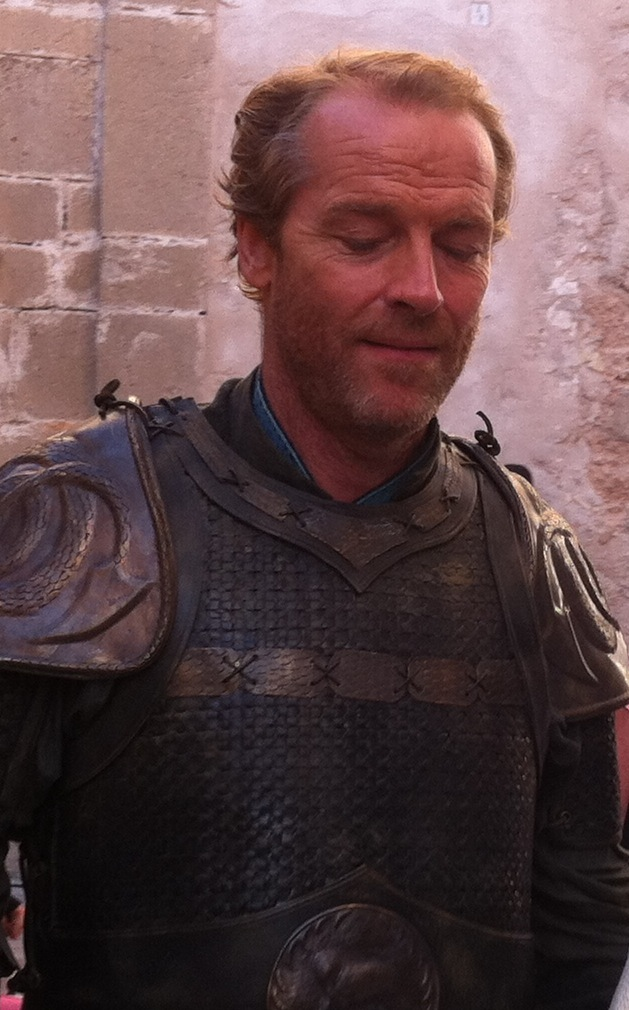
- Iain Glen as Jorah Mormont
- First appearance: Novel: A Game of Thrones (1996); Television: "Winter Is Coming" (2011)
- Last appearance: Television: "The Last of the Starks" (2019)
- Created by: George R. R. Martin
- Portrayed by: Iain Glen

In-universe information
- Alias: Jorah the Andal
- Gender: Male
- Titles: Ser; Lord of Bear Island (stripped)
- Family: House Mormont
- Spouses: Lady Glover; Lynesse Hightower (estranged)
- Relatives: Jeor Mormont (father); Maege Mormont (aunt); Dacey Mormont (paternal cousin); Alysane Mormont (paternal cousin); Lyra Mormont (paternal cousin); Jorelle Mormont (paternal cousin); Lyanna Mormont (paternal cousin); Alerie Tyrell (sister-in-law); Willas Tyrell (nephew by marriage); Garlan Tyrell (nephew by marriage); Loras Tyrell (nephew by marriage); Margaery Tyrell (niece by marriage)

Jorah Mormont is a fictional character in the A Song of Ice and Fire series of fantasy novels by American author George R. R. Martin and its television adaptation, Game of Thrones.

Introduced in A Game of Thrones (1996), Jorah is a knight in exile, the disgraced former lord of Bear Island, and the only son of Jeor Mormont, the honorable lord commander of the Night's Watch. Jorah subsequently appeared in Martin's A Clash of Kings (1998), A Storm of Swords (2000), and A Dance with Dragons (2011). After fleeing Westeros, Jorah pledges fealty to Daenerys Targaryen and, over the course of both the novels and the television show, becomes her closest and most loyal companion; Jorah's passionate yet unrequited love of Daenerys is central to the character's arc in both the novels and television show. He is portrayed as a skilled warrior whose knowledge of the peoples and customs of Essos proves invaluable to Daenerys' journeys.

Jorah is portrayed by the Scottish actor Iain Glen in the HBO television adaptation.

== Character ==
=== Background ===
Ser Jorah Mormont is the only child of the Night's Watch's Lord Commander Jeor Mormont, who abdicated his lordship over Bear Island shortly before Robert's Rebellion to join the Night's Watch, allowing Jorah to assume control of Bear Island. At some point, Jorah married a lady of House Glover, who died from a miscarriage after ten years of marriage. Jorah fought in House Greyjoy's rebellion, distinguishing himself by being one of the first to enter the fray during the siege of Pyke, for which he was knighted by King Robert Baratheon. At a tourney at Lannisport celebrating the Baratheon victory, Jorah fell in love with the beautiful Lynesse Hightower, an aunt of Margaery Tyrell. After winning the tourney, he named her "Queen of Love and Beauty" and asked her father for her hand in marriage, which he accepted. However, Lynesse found herself ill-suited to the rough life on Bear Island, having grown up as a member of the wealthy House Hightower. Jorah bankrupted himself trying to provide her with luxuries and eventually sold poachers found on his lands to a Tyroshi slaver to fund her lifestyle. His liege lord, Eddard Stark, sentenced Jorah to death; however, he and Lynesse fled to Lys. Jorah then pursued a career as a sellsword, yet his earnings were insufficient to satisfy Lynesse. Subsequently, he returned from a campaign to discover that Lynesse had become a concubine of a wealthy Lysene merchant. The merchant warned Jorah that he would be enslaved to settle his debts if he remained in Lys, compelling Jorah to flee once more. Afterward, he drifted among the Free Cities and the Dothraki, before becoming a spy for Varys.

Jorah Mormont is not a point-of-view character in the novels, so his actions are witnessed and interpreted through the eyes of Daenerys Targaryen and Tyrion Lannister. Jorah mostly provides Daenerys with background information, such as Westerosi history and the various cultures of Essos.

== Storylines ==
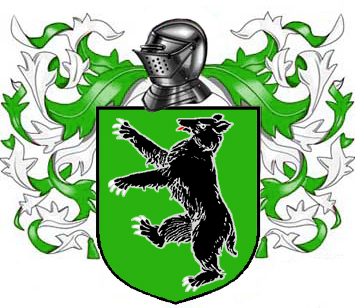
Coat of arms of House Mormont

=== A Game of Thrones ===
In Pentos, Jorah enters the service of House Targaryen during Daenerys Targaryen's wedding to Khal Drogo. However, he is actually spying on behalf of Robert Baratheon's Master of Whisperers, Varys, in hopes of earning a royal pardon. Although Jorah holds Daenerys's surviving brother, Viserys III, in contempt, he comes to admire Daenerys for her bravery and strength of character and eventually falls in love with her. In Vaes Dothrak, Jorah is warned by Illyrio Mopatis that Robert has ordered Daenerys's assassination and saves her from being poisoned. After Khal Drogo's death, Jorah is the first to pledge fealty to Daenerys and is astounded when she emerges from Drogo's funeral pyre with three dragon hatchlings.

=== A Clash of Kings ===
Jorah accompanies Daenerys and the remnants of her khalasar to Qarth. There, Jorah stops sending reports to Varys, having truly fallen in love with Daenerys. Daenerys discovers his love after Jorah notes her physical similarity to Lynesse, but she does not tell Jorah that she knows. At Qarth's docks, Jorah and Daenerys encounter the former pit fighter Strong Belwas and his squire, Arstan Whitebeard. Arstan claims to know Jorah; Jorah finds him familiar but does not recognise him. Despite Jorah's mistrust, Daenerys accepts the duo into her service.

=== A Storm of Swords ===
Jorah confesses his love to Daenerys, who rejects his advances. Jorah recommends that they sail to Astapor to buy an army of "Unsullied" and commands the army when they overthrow the masters of Yunkai'i. As they arrive at Meereen, Arstan is revealed to be Ser Barristan Selmy, former Kingsguard to Aerys II Targaryen and Robert, and he announces Jorah's former status as a spy. Daenerys orders Jorah and Selmy to infiltrate Meereen and release slaves. Upon their return, Jorah refuses to beg forgiveness, insisting that Daenerys owes him forgiveness as reward for his service. Daenerys agrees but notes that she cannot grant it without undermining her authority, and she banishes Jorah.

=== A Dance With Dragons ===
Jorah encounters the exiled Tyrion Lannister in a brothel in Selhorys and abducts him, hoping to return to Daenerys's graces by presenting a Lannister captive as a gift. In Volantis, they encounter the dwarf Penny, whom Tyrion takes pity on and is allowed by Jorah to accompany them. During their voyage to Meereen, their ship is disabled by a storm and later seized by slavers, and Jorah is badly beaten and branded trying to fend them off. In Meereen, the trio is sold to the Yunkish master Yezzan zo Qaggaz. Jorah becomes despondent after learning that Daenerys has married the Meereenese nobleman Hizdhar zo Loraq. When Yezzan dies from dysentery, Jorah and Tyrion escape to the camp of the sellsword company Second Sons, formerly in service to Daenerys before defecting to the slavers, and Jorah rejoins the company along with Tyrion. Jorah realises that the Yunkai'i will lose the coming battle with Meereen and tells Tyrion that they need to convince the company to defect again.

=== Family tree of House Mormont ===
Jeor	Maege
Lady; Glover	Jorah	Lynesse; Hightower	Dacey	Alysane	Lyra	Jorelle	Lyanna
Daughter	Son

== TV adaptation ==
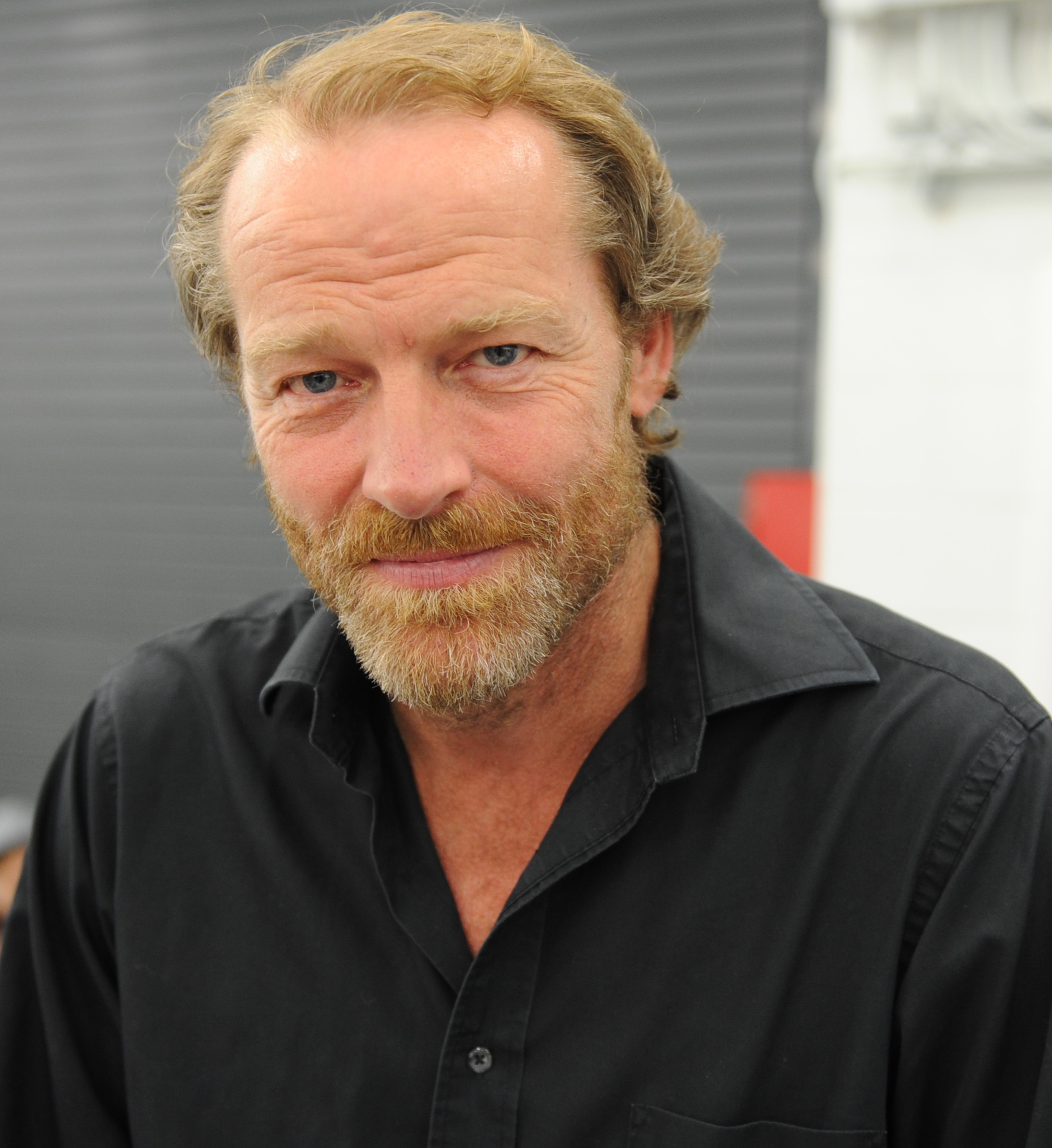
Iain Glen plays the role of Jorah Mormont in the television series.

Scottish actor Iain Glen portrays Jorah Mormont in the television adaptation of the book series.

=== Season 1 ===
Ser Jorah Mormont is an exiled knight in the service of Daenerys Targaryen and the son of Jeor Mormont of the Night's Watch. To fund his former wife's extravagant lifestyle, he sold poachers on his land to slave traders, which is illegal in the Seven Kingdoms. Rather than face punishment from Lord Ned Stark, he fled to Essos and learned the lifestyle of the Dothraki, who embraced him as one of their own and knew him as "Jorah the Andal". Jorah serves as an adviser to House Targaryen on both political and cultural matters regarding the Seven Kingdoms and Essos. Jorah is actually spying on the Targaryens for Lord Varys in exchange for a pardon from Robert Baratheon, but after learning more about Daenerys, it appears that Jorah is falling for her; he even prevents her poisoning when Robert and Varys order it.

=== Season 2 ===
When Daenerys is widowed after Khal Drogo's death, Jorah travels with her to Qarth and becomes the first knight of her Queensguard, serving as her advisor and protector. When a mysterious, masked female soothsayer (privately) questions his fealty, he affirms that he will no longer help Varys, or anybody else, betray Daenerys. He explains to Daenerys that he respects her birthright claim to the Seven Kingdoms as she "has a kind heart", which he believes to be the key to being a just ruler. When Daenerys's dragons are stolen by the warlock Pyat Pree (a member of the Thirteen, the leaders of Qarth) and taken to the House of the Undying, Jorah accompanies her as she defeats the dragons' captor and departs Qarth for Astapor.

=== Season 3 ===
After Daenerys sacks Astapor and defeats the slavers who own the city, Jorah plays an important part in the capture of Yunkai, together with "Unsullied" commander Grey Worm and Daario Naharis, a lieutenant and leader of the Second Sons. Led by Daario, the trio infiltrates the city and kills a number of Yunkish guards to open a gate, ensuring the city's capture. Jorah subsequently aids Daenerys and her forces in the conquest of Meereen and informs her of the demise of Joffrey Baratheon. He further advises her against invading King's Landing, as she currently lacks sufficient strength to conquer all of Westeros. When Daenerys appears to begin a romantic relationship with Daario, Jorah voices his disapproval.

=== Season 4 ===
Following Daenerys's capture of Meereen, Jorah joins her council and aids her in ruling the city and its nearby territories. However, another member of Daenerys's advisory council, Ser Selmy Barristan, uncovers the truth about Jorah's original mission in Essos, and presents the information to Daenerys. When it is revealed to her that Jorah spied on her for the "usurper" Robert Baratheon, which almost led to her poisoning by the wine merchant in Vaes Dothrak, she exiles Jorah from Meereen on the threat of death. Jorah subsequently departs alone, with his destination unclear.

=== Season 5 ===
Jorah encounters Tyrion Lannister in Volantis and kidnaps him with the intention of delivering him to Daenerys. Sailing through the ruins of Valyria, the duo is assaulted by "stone men"—humans turned insane by the disease "greyscale"—and Jorah is infected in the struggle. He decides to hide this information from Tyrion. Jorah then learns from Tyrion that his father, Jeor, was killed in a Night's Watch mutiny beyond the Wall. The pair is captured by slavers and sold into the fighting pits in Meereen. At a demonstration of pit fighters, Jorah encounters Daenerys, who orders him freed but refuses to let him return to her service. With nowhere else left to go, Jorah returns to the fighting pits. At the reopening of the fighting pits, Jorah foils an assassination attempt on Daenerys and protects her from the insurgent Sons of the Harpy in the resulting confrontation. After Daenerys flies away on Drogon, Jorah and Daario Naharis leave Meereen to look for her.

=== Season 6 ===
Jorah and Daario discover Daenerys's intentionally discarded ring in a grass plain, and Jorah deduces that she has been captured by a Dothraki horde and taken to Vaes Dothrak. Upon arriving there, they are reunited with Daenerys, who rejects their offer to flee the city and instead asks them to help her with her own plan, to which they reluctantly agree. The next evening, Jorah and Daario watch as Daenerys, after trapping and burning all the khals alive in the temple, emerges from it completely unharmed, and they join the rest of the Dothraki in kneeling before her in awe. As Daenerys and her entourage prepare to leave Vaes Dothrak, Jorah reveals his greyscale to Daenerys and his intention to end his life before his illness overtakes him. Daenerys instead orders him to find a cure for his condition and return to her, declaring that she will need his counsel after conquering Westeros. Jorah then departs alone.

=== Season 7 ===
Jorah returns to Westeros, seeking aid at the Citadel in Oldtown. By this time, his greyscale has progressed drastically, consuming his entire arm and part of his torso. Archmaester Ebrose diagnoses Jorah's greyscale as untreatably advanced, tells him he has six months of sanity left, and exiles him from the Citadel the next day. Samwell Tarly, who formerly served under Jeor in the Night's Watch, rediscovers a cure for greyscale. Despite being forbidden to administer it, because whoever treats the patient could become infected, he treats Jorah in secret and successfully heals Jorah's greyscale. Ebrose, though unimpressed by Jorah's attempts to conceal Sam's treatment, discharges Jorah. Jorah then returns to Daenerys, who is happy to see him and accepts him into her service once again. He then joins the expedition led by Jon Snow beyond the Wall to capture a wight and prove its existence to Cersei Lannister. He and Jon talk about their respective fathers, and Jon expresses his relief that Jorah was not executed. Jon attempts to return Longclaw, the Mormont sword given to him by Jeor, to Jorah, on the basis that it is still the family sword of House Mormont, but Jorah refuses, claiming that he forfeited his right to claim the sword and that Jeor gave the weapon to Jon, making it his. Jorah survives the expedition and returns to Dragonstone.

=== Season 8 ===
Jorah travels with Jon, Daenerys, and her forces to Winterfell to make a stand against the White Walkers. Daenerys is displeased with Tyrion when she learns that his sister Cersei Lannister is not sending her army, but she is mollified after Jorah speaks up in support of him. Samwell grants Jorah House Tarly's ancestral sword Heartsbane out of gratitude for Jeor's formative influence on him. During the Battle of Winterfell, Jorah is mortally wounded defending Daenerys from certain death at the hands of the undead, though he does survive long enough to see the army felled when Arya Stark kills the Night King. Jorah dies in the arms of a sobbing Daenerys, encircled by the wings of her dragon, Drogon. He is cremated the following morning by Daenerys.

== Reception and analysis ==
The character of Ser Jorah Mormont has been summarized as a "brave warrior" and "wise military adviser". BuzzFeed reviewer Jamie Jirak saw Jorah Mormont as "the best man in Westeros" and, in the later part of his development, a selfless and honorable character, and a soft man based on showing emotions. She praised the portrayal by Ian Glen in the TV series as "sexy" and "way hotter than he is in the books." She also rated the scene where Mormont asked Daenerys for forgiveness as "the most heartbreaking moment in the series."

Estelle Paranque saw parallels between Jorah Mormont and Francis Walsingham in their roles of advisors. She also pointed out that the "striking major difference that cannot be overlooked is the fact that Mormont is madly in love with Daenerys whereas there is no record of such romantic feelings regarding Walsingham and the Tudor queen [Elizabeth I]. However, both men are deeply committed to the queen's welfare and security."

Cyrille Sardais and Marine Agogué saw Mormont's development from spy for her enemies to "showing unparalleled devotion to Daenerys" as the best example of her charismatic influence on her supporters.

Jorah Mormont has been titled by fans as "Ser Friendzone" due to his unrequited love for Daenerys. In comparison to Daario, who is successful in winning her affection through "clumsy" seduction, it is regarded as unfair that Mormont is relegated to the role of friend despite his dedicated engagement on her behalf. Together with the troubled relationships to his two wives in his past, this makes Mormont a tragic hero with regard to romance, while the conflict between loyality to his previous employer, Varys, and to Daenerys does so on a moral level. Looking at mythological archetypes according to Joseph Campbell, Mark Hübner-Weinhold and Manfred Klapproth defined Jorah as "the dishonored knight, because he strives for salvation – similar to Lancelot from Arthurian legend or Ivanhoe in the novel by Walter Scott." The series of bad decisions which lead to Mormont's downfall are understandable to the viewer, being based on covering up facts to avoid negative consequences. In combination with his inner conflict, Jorah appears "deeply human and thus an important identification figure" and a fan favorite.

When applying Campbell's template of the Hero's Journey to Daenerys Targaryen, Kenzo John Carlo A. Calahong et al. found that Jorah Mormont conforms to the archetypal categories of the Mentor, by teaching and protecting her, and the Ally, by steadfastly supporting her up to fighting to his death for her. Mormont also represents one of the obstacles on the heroine's Road of Trials, as she has to show "her ability to be merciful while a kind and just queen" when discovering his initial allegiance to her enemies.
