= Varys =

Character in A Song of Ice and Fire and Game of Thrones

- A Song of Ice and Fire character Game of Thrones character
- Conleth Hill as Varys
- First appearance: Novel: A Game of Thrones (1996); Television: "Lord Snow" (2011)
- First game: Game of Thrones (2012)
- Last appearance: Television: "The Bells" (2019)
- Created by: George R. R. Martin
- Adapted by: David Benioff; D. B. Weiss (Game of Thrones)
- Portrayed by: Conleth Hill

In-universe information
- Aliases: The Spider; The Eunuch; Lord Varys; Rugen; Varys of Lys; Jamie Orton
- Gender: Male (castrated)
- Title: Master of Whisperers
- Occupation: Ex prostitute, ex thief, ex actor, King's functionary
- Nationality: Lysene

Lord Varys is a fictional character in the A Song of Ice and Fire series of fantasy novels by American author George R. R. Martin, and its television adaptation Game of Thrones.

Introduced in 1996's A Game of Thrones, Varys is a former slave eunuch from the city of Lys and the master of whisperers in King's Landing. He subsequently appeared in Martin's books A Clash of Kings (1998), A Storm of Swords (2000), and A Dance with Dragons (2011). He proves to be a key ally to Ned Stark and Tyrion Lannister at court, but his true motives remain shrouded in mystery to those who employ his services.

Varys is portrayed by Conleth Hill in the HBO television adaptation.

== Character overview ==
Varys is not a point of view character in the novels, so his actions are witnessed and interpreted through the eyes of other people, such as Ned Stark, Tyrion and Cersei Lannister.

=== Background ===
Varys was born as a slave in the Free City of Lys and joined a travelling acting troupe. While the troupe was performing in Myr, a sorcerer bought the young Varys from the troupe's leader, drugged Varys before removing his genitals and burning them in a brazier in a blood magic ritual, and afterwards cast him into the streets. Varys turned to begging, prostitution, and ultimately theft to survive, but soon became known in Myr and fled to Pentos. There he befriended a poor sellsword, Illyrio Mopatis, with whom he teamed up to steal valuables from other thieves and return them to their owners for a fee. Varys eventually realized that there was more to gain from stealing secrets instead of valuables and trained his spies to copy information from the wealthy and powerful. Varys and Illyrio became rich, and Varys' reputation reached the ears of the King of Westeros, Aerys II Targaryen, who appointed Varys as his Master of Whisperers. Jaime claims that Aerys saw traitors everywhere, and Varys was quick to point out any he missed. Apparently, when Rhaegar Targaryen intended to use a Tourney at Harrenhal to call a Great Council to deal with his father's instability, and possibly dethrone him, Varys warned Aerys, and they attended the tourney. Sometime prior to the Sack of King's Landing, Varys allegedly had Rhaegar's infant son Aegon swapped with a lowborn baby and smuggled to Essos to be raised in hiding by Rhaegar's friend Jon Connington, who was exiled by the Mad King for failing to defeat Robert. Varys remains Master of Whisperers after Robert Baratheon seizes the Iron Throne but his true loyalties are implied to lie with Aegon, with his motivations and reasons for supporting Aegon largely remaining a mystery.

=== Description ===
Varys, also called the Spider, is a eunuch and courtier who serves as Master of Whisperers, the spymaster for the king of the Seven Kingdoms at the royal court in King's Landing. As Master of Whisperers he is on the small council. He is feared by nobles and common people alike. He knows all of the secret passages in the royal castle, and his spies are found everywhere. He is a skilled manipulator and commands a network of informants across two continents. He often puts on the public persona of being nothing more than a bald, pudgy man well suited to the pleasantries of court life; humble, obsequious, fawning, and a little effeminate. This is simply a facade that Varys has developed, which often leads those who do not know him well to underestimate him as a cheerful and vapid flatterer. In reality he is a cunning and ruthless manipulator of court politics, on par with Master of Coin, Petyr Baelish ("Littlefinger"). Unlike Littlefinger, Varys insists that his goals are to achieve what he honestly feels is best for the realm.

== Storylines ==
=== In the books ===
==== A Game of Thrones ====
Soon after Eddard Stark's arrival in King's Landing, Varys warns him that Robert's wife Cersei Lannister intends to kill Robert and offers his help to Eddard in investigating the Lannisters. He later meets in secret with Illyrio to discuss stalling a war between Houses Stark and Lannister until the right moment; this is overheard by Arya Stark, but she is unable to identify the men. When Robert is ultimately killed, Varys remains spymaster for his heir Joffrey and suggests that Ser Barristan Selmy be blamed for Robert's death. Selmy is removed from the Kingsguard and ultimately defects to Daenerys Targaryen. Varys visits Eddard in captivity and convinces him to plead guilty to treason and join the Night's Watch in order to save the life of his daughters Sansa and Arya, which would also avert war between the Starks and Lannisters, and Ned eventually agrees. Varys is horrified, however, when Joffrey has Ned executed anyway and tries in vain to dissuade the King whilst Littlefinger smugly looks on. In the aftermath, Varys arranges for Robert's bastard Gendry to join the Night's Watch, to avoid being killed by Cersei.

==== A Clash of Kings ====
Varys is the first to learn that Tyrion Lannister has brought his mistress Shae with him to King's Landing, and tells Tyrion of a route that he can use to visit her. He forms an uneasy alliance with Tyrion to share the information gathered by his spy network.

==== A Storm of Swords ====
Varys continues to facilitate Tyrion and Shae's trysts, but testifies against Tyrion when Tyrion is tried for Joffrey's murder. After Tyrion is sentenced to death, Jaime Lannister forces Varys to aid in Tyrion's escape. As Varys and Tyrion escape through the secret passages of the Red Keep, Tyrion decides to seek out his father Tywin's chambers. Varys protests but gives Tyrion the exact directions to Tywin's room.

==== A Feast for Crows ====
After helping Tyrion escape, Varys disappears. A Red Keep turnkey, Rugen, disappears at the same time, and a Tyrell coin is found in his chambers. This cements Cersei's distrust of House Tyrell, although she is unaware Rugen is merely a disguise of Varys'.

==== A Dance with Dragons ====
Varys sneaks into the Red Keep to kill Grand Maester Pycelle. He also lures Lord Regent Kevan Lannister into Pycelle's chambers and mortally wounds him. As Kevan dies, Varys explains that his death was necessary to destabilise the Seven Kingdoms in preparation for Aegon Targaryen's invasion, before ordering his little birds to finish Kevan off.

=== In the show ===
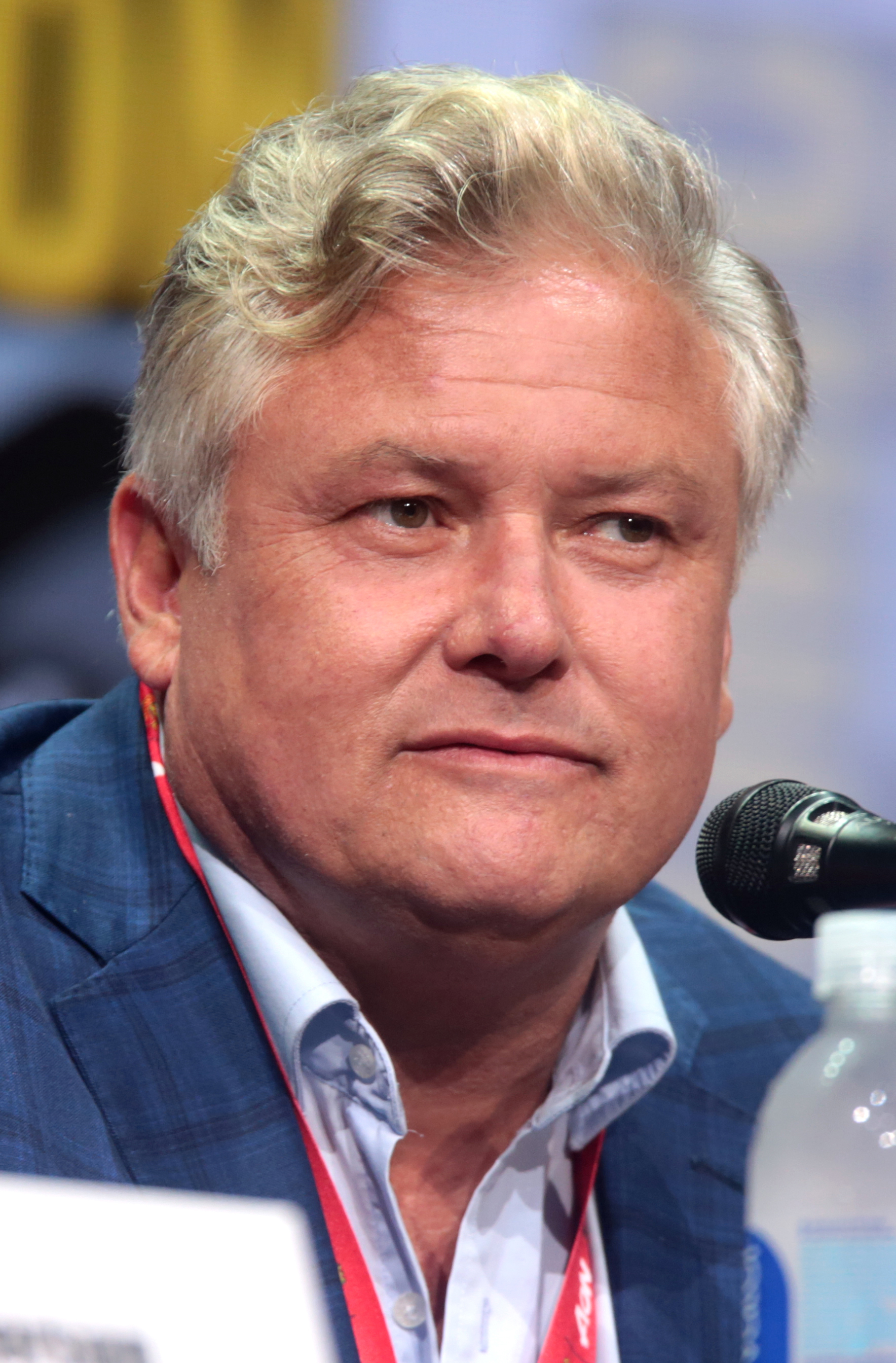
Conleth Hill plays the role of Varys in the television series

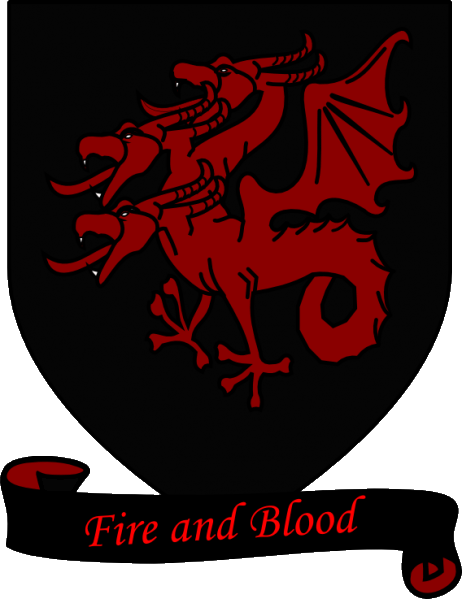
Coat of arms of House Targaryen

==== Season 1 and 2 ====
Varys' storyline remains, for the most part, identical between the first two seasons of the show and the books.

==== Season 3 ====
After Littlefinger's confidante Ros is severely beaten by Joffrey's guards and Littlefinger fails to intervene, Varys takes Ros into his service as a spy. Littlefinger finds out and sells her to the sadist Joffrey, taunting the eunuch that Varys could not protect her. Varys affirms his course as a means to prevent chaos befalling the realm, claiming that Littlefinger "would see the Seven Kingdoms burn, if he could be king over the ashes."

==== Season 4 ====
Varys informs Tyrion that Cersei has discovered his relationship with Shae. Although Varys claims he will not lie for him, he implores Tyrion to send Shae away for her own safety. Varys later testifies against Tyrion at his trial for murdering Joffrey, but when Tyrion is convicted, Jaime enlists Varys' help in smuggling Tyrion out of King's Landing to Essos. As Varys prepares to return to the Red Keep, he hears the tolling bells, making him realise that Tyrion's escape has been discovered (along with his murder of Tywin), and he joins Tyrion on the voyage to Essos.

==== Season 5 ====
Varys and Tyrion arrive in Pentos, where Varys reveals his allegiance to House Targaryen and convinces Tyrion to travel with him to Meereen and aid Daenerys Targaryen in retaking the Iron Throne. While in Volantis, Tyrion is kidnapped by Daenerys' former advisor Jorah Mormont. Varys journeys on to Meereen, where he arrives to discover Tyrion in control of the city in Daenerys' absence. He offers Tyrion the use of his spy network to maintain order in the city.

==== Season 6 ====
Varys discovers that the Meereenese insurgency, the Sons of the Harpy, are funded by the masters of Yunkai and Astapor and the slavers of Volantis, and brokers a meeting between Tyrion and representatives of those cities. The slavers agree to a truce with Tyrion, and Meereen begins to prosper. Varys departs for the Seven Kingdoms, telling Tyrion that he will seek out allies for Daenerys. His ultimate destination is Dorne, where Ellaria Sand has killed Doran Martell in anger at his inaction against the Lannisters and seized power. There he meets and forms alliances with Ellaria and Olenna Tyrell, who also seeks vengeance against Cersei, as Cersei's machinations have caused the death of all the other Tyrells. Varys returns to Meereen with ships from Dorne and the Reach, and sets sail for Westeros with Daenerys and her army.

==== Season 7 ====
Varys, along with Daenerys and her entire army, reaches Dragonstone. While in Dragonstone, Varys helps in planning the attack against Cersei. Daenerys thanks him for getting the support of The Reach and Dorne, but confronts Varys for his past allegiances. Varys defends himself by saying that he doesn't serve any King/Queen but serves the people. Daenerys forgives him but warns Varys not to betray her, or else she would burn him alive. Varys then tells Daenerys of Euron Greyjoy's attack as well as defeat of Highgarden against the Lannister army. While talking with Tyrion, Varys criticizes Daenerys for burning Randyll and Dickon Tarly alive. He also reads the raven sent from Winterfell before informing Jon Snow. Varys accompanies Daenerys, Jon, and others to King's Landing to discuss a truce with Cersei.

==== Season 8 ====
During the White Walkers' attack on Winterfell, Varys shelters in the crypts with the other non-combatants, and survives the Night King's reanimation of those buried in the crypts. In the aftermath of the battle, Varys observes Daenerys' dismay at not being lauded by the Northerners. He accompanies her court back to Dragonstone to prepare to attack King's Landing, and is told by Tyrion that Jon Snow is secretly Rhaegar's son and thus the rightful heir to the Iron Throne. The fleet is ambushed by Euron Greyjoy's Iron Fleet and Missandei is captured and executed. After failing to convince Tyrion to help him install Jon as king, or (it is implied) to poison Daenerys, Varys openly approaches Jon and suggests that he become king. Jon rebuffs him, and Tyrion reveals Varys' betrayal to Daenerys. Daenerys has Varys brought before her and has Drogon burn him alive.

== TV adaptation ==
Varys is played by the Northern Irish actor Conleth Hill in the television adaption of the series of books. Author George R. R. Martin wrote about the casting of Hill as Varys, "Hill, like Varys, is quite a chameleon, an actor who truly disappears inside the characters he portrays, more than capable of bringing the slimy, simpering eunuch to life."

=== Recognition and awards ===
Year	Award	Category	Result	Ref.
2011	Scream Awards	Best Ensemble	Nominated	
2012	Screen Actors Guild Award	Outstanding Performance by an Ensemble in a Drama Series	Nominated	
2015	Screen Actors Guild Award	Outstanding Performance by an Ensemble in a Drama Series	Nominated	
2015	Empire Award	Empire Hero Award (Ensemble)	Won	
2017	Screen Actors Guild Award	Outstanding Performance by an Ensemble in a Drama Series	Nominated	
