= John Bradley (English actor) =

English actor (born 1988)

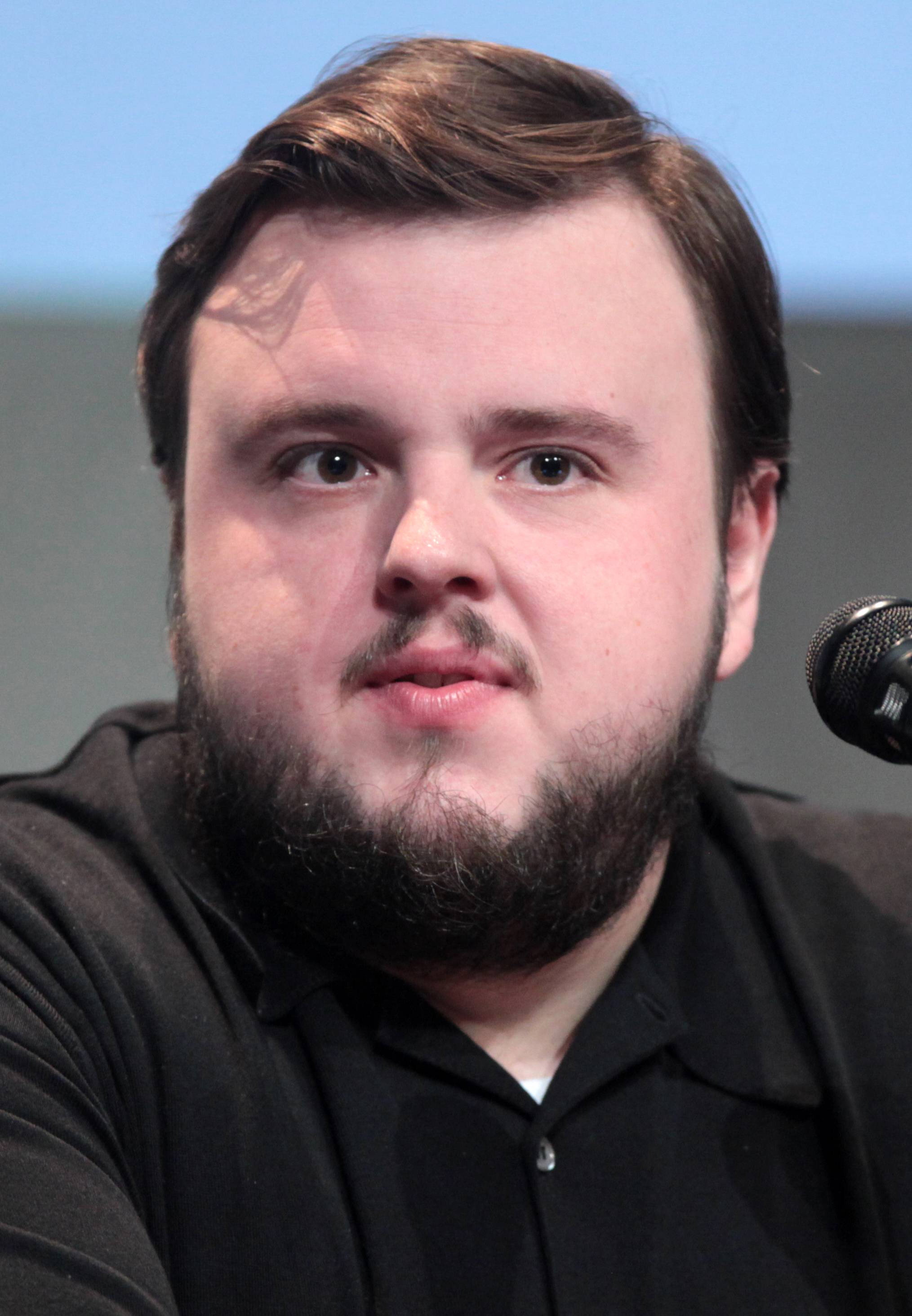
- Bradley at the 2015 San Diego Comic-Con
- Born: John Bradley West; 15 September 1988 (age 38); Wythenshawe, Greater Manchester, England
- Education: Manchester Metropolitan University (BA)
- Occupation: Actor
- Years active: 2011-present

John Bradley West (born 15 September 1988) is an English actor, best known for his role as Samwell Tarly in the HBO fantasy TV series Game of Thrones.

== Early life ==
Bradley was born on 15 September 1988. He grew up as a Catholic in the Wythenshawe district of south Manchester and attended St Paul's Roman Catholic High School. He has a sister who is 13 years older than he is.

From 2005 to 2007, he studied law, psychology, English language, and drama and theatre studies at Loreto College in the Hulme area of Manchester. He earned a BA in acting at the Manchester School of Theatre, part of Manchester Metropolitan University, graduating in 2010.

== Career ==
Three months after he graduated from drama school, in his first audition Bradley won the part of Samwell Tarly in the 2011 HBO fantasy TV series Game of Thrones, whom he would play for all 8 seasons of the show. His character is a friend of Kit Harington's Jon Snow and provides occasional comic relief, especially in season 1. As the series progressed, Bradley's Tarly developed significantly. One reviewer called him "a wonderful comedic and cowardly yin to Jon's dour yang". George R. R. Martin said that the character that Bradley portrays is the character he would be, if he were on the show.

In 2011, Bradley appeared in the Canal+ drama, Borgia, in the role of Giovanni di Lorenzo de' Medici, the future Pope Leo X. In 2012, he played the character Tyr Seward in the BBC production of Merlin in series 5, in the episode "A Lesson in Vengeance". The same year, he appeared on the Channel 4 TV series Shameless in the role of Wesley, Frank Gallagher's boss, in two episodes of series 10. In 2015, Bradley played the role of Miloš Hrma in the BBC Radio 4 radio play production of Closely Observed Trains.

In 2018, Bradley appeared as Scooter in the film Patient Zero, with fellow Game of Thrones performer Natalie Dormer. In 2022, he was one of the leads in the Roland Emmerich disaster film Moonfall and played a supporting role in the romantic comedy Marry Me, starring Jennifer Lopez and Owen Wilson.

== Personal life ==
Bradley is a supporter of Manchester United. He plays the drums.

== Filmography ==
=== Film ===
Key
†	Denotes films that have not yet been released

Year	Title	Role	Notes
2012	Anna Karenina	Austrian Prince	Uncredited
2015	Traders	Vernon Stynes	
2015	Man Up	Andrew	Uncredited
2016	Grimsby	Derrick Fellner/Fan in Pub	
2016	Roger	Roy	Short film
2017	American Satan	Ricky Rollins	
2018	Patient Zero	Scooter	
2022	Moonfall	Dr. KC Houseman	
2022	Marry Me	Collin Calloway	
2022	The Railway Children Return	Richard Perks	
2026	Merry Christmas Aubrey Flint	Aubrey Flint	
TBA	Ibelin †	TBA	Filming

=== Television ===
Year	Title	Role	Notes
2011–19	Game of Thrones	Samwell Tarly	Main role; 48 episodes Nominated – Screen Actors Guild Award for Outstanding Performance by an Ensemble in a Drama Series (2011, 2013–15)
2011	Borgia	Giovanni di Lorenzo de' Medici	5 episodes
2012	Merlin	Tyr Seward	Episode: "A Lesson in Vengeance"
2012	Shameless	Wesley	2 episodes
2016	The Last Dragonslayer	Gordon (adult)	Television film
2019	Saturday Night Live	Himself	Episode: "Kit Harington/Sara Bareilles"
2019	Robot Chicken	Gordon Ramsay, Quint, Eric (voice)	Episode: "Boogie Bardstown in: No Need, I Have Coupons"
2020	Urban Myths	Young Les Dawson	6 episodes
2023	North Shore	Max Drummond	Main role
2024	3 Body Problem	Jack Rooney	3 episodes

=== Audio ===
Year	Title	Role	Notes
2024	The Mysterious Affair at Styles	Lawrence Cavendish	Audible original

=== Video games ===
Year	Title	Voice role	Notes
2018	World of Warcraft: Battle for Azeroth	Apprentice Marten Webb	
