= A Storm of Swords =

2000 novel by George R. R. Martin

- US hardcover (first edition)
- Author: George R. R. Martin
- Audio read by: Roy Dotrice
- Cover artist: Stephen Youll
- Language: English
- Series: A Song of Ice and Fire
- Release number: 3
- Genre: Fantasy
- Published: August 8, 2000 (Voyager Books/UK) & November 2000 (Bantam Spectra/US)
- Publication place: United States
- Pages: 973
- Award: Locus Award for Best Fantasy Novel (2001)
- ISBN: 0-553-10663-5 (US Hardback); ISBN 0-00-224586-8 (UK Hardback)
- OCLC: 44676135
- Dewey Decimal: 813/.54 21
- LC Class: PS3563.A7239 S7 2000
- Preceded by: A Clash of Kings
- Followed by: A Feast for Crows

A Storm of Swords is the third of seven planned novels in the high fantasy series A Song of Ice and Fire by American author George R. R. Martin. It was first published in the United Kingdom on August 8, 2000, with a United States edition following in November 2000. Its publication was preceded by a novella called Path of the Dragon, which collects some of the Daenerys Targaryen chapters from the novel into a single book.

At its publication, A Storm of Swords was the longest novel in the series. It was so long that in the UK, Ireland, Australia, Serbia, and Israel, its paperback edition was split in half, Part 1 being published as Steel and Snow in June 2001 (with the one-volume cover) and Part 2 as Blood and Gold in August 2001 (with a specially commissioned new cover). The same division was used in the Polish and Greek editions. In France, the decision was made to cut the novel into four separate volumes.

A Storm of Swords won the 2001 Locus Award, the 2002 Geffen Award for Best Novel, and was nominated for the 2001 Nebula Award for Best Novel. It was the first novel in the series to be nominated for the Hugo Award, among the two most prestigious science fiction and fantasy publishing awards. However, it lost to J. K. Rowling's Harry Potter and the Goblet of Fire novel.

Meisha Merlin Publishing, which had previously issued limited, illustrated editions of both A Game of Thrones and A Clash of Kings, was planning to release a similar version for A Storm of Swords in two volumes; however, lengthy delays in the release of A Clash of Kings caused it to lose its publishing rights, which Subterranean Press picked up. This edition, illustrated by Charles Vess, was released in the summer of 2006.

A Storm of Swords is also the name of the second expansion to the board game A Game of Thrones, released in July 2006. Approximately the first half of the novel was adapted for television as the third season of the HBO show Game of Thrones. The second half became the basis for the series' fourth season and some elements for the series' fifth season.

== Plot ==
A Storm of Swords picks up the story slightly before the end of its predecessor, A Clash of Kings. The Seven Kingdoms of Westeros are still in the grip of the War of the Five Kings, wherein Joffrey Baratheon and his uncle Stannis Baratheon compete for the Iron Throne, while Robb Stark of the North and Balon Greyjoy of the Iron Islands declare their independence. (Stannis's brother Renly Baratheon, the fifth king, has already been killed.) Meanwhile, a large host of wildlings, the tribes from beyond the Seven Kingdoms' northern border, approach the Wall that marks the border, under the leadership of Mance Rayder, the self-proclaimed "King Beyond the Wall", with only the undermanned Night's Watch in opposition. Finally, Daenerys Targaryen, the daughter of a deposed former king of Westeros and "mother" of the world's only living dragons, sails west, planning to retake her late father's throne.

=== In the Seven Kingdoms ===
==== The Riverlands ====
At her father's castle of Riverrun, Robb's mother, Catelyn Stark, releases the captive Jaime Lannister, Joffrey's 'uncle'—in actuality, his biological father—in order to secure the release of Catelyn's daughters, Sansa and Arya, who Catelyn believes are both being held hostage by the Lannisters in the capital city, King's Landing. Jaime is sent south, escorted by Brienne of Tarth. Robb's army returns to Riverrun, having vanquished the Lannister armies in the west, and Robb reveals that he has married Jeyne Westerling, violating his promise to be wed to a daughter of House Frey. These actions alienate and infuriate some of Robb's allies, weakening his military position.

Jaime and Brienne are captured by mercenaries working for Roose Bolton, who is nominally an ally of Robb but secretly planning to undermine him and become Warden of the North. The mercenary captain Vargo Hoat has Jaime's sword hand cut off. Brienne is thrown into a bear pit by Hoat, and Jaime risks his own life to save her. Bolton releases Jaime and Brienne, and they head to King's Landing.

Arya Stark, traveling in the Riverlands, is taken in by the "Brotherhood Without Banners": a band that defends the smallfolk of the Riverlands, led by Lord Beric Dondarrion and the red priest Thoros of Myr. The group captures Sandor "the Hound" Clegane, Joffrey's former bodyguard, and offers him trial by combat for his crimes. The Hound kills Beric, but Thoros resurrects him with the power of the fire god R'hllor. The Hound kidnaps Arya and flees with her, planning to ransom her.

In order to return north to defend the region against Greyjoy attacks, Robb needs the support of the Freys. The Freys propose a wedding between one of Lord Walder Frey's daughters and Catelyn's brother Edmure Tully, now lord of the Riverlands, to compensate for Robb breaking his marriage agreement. At the wedding celebration, the Boltons and Freys turn on the Starks, massacring Robb's bannermen. Robb is murdered by Roose Bolton, while Catelyn's throat is cut and her body is thrown into the river; Edmure is kept alive as a hostage. These events become known as the Red Wedding.

Arya and the Hound witness the massacre and escape. Later, the Hound is wounded in a skirmish, and Arya abandons him. She takes a ship to the Free City of Braavos, where the assassin Jaqen H'ghar had told her she could find him.

In the epilogue, a reanimated but decayed and mutilated Catelyn is leading the Brotherhood Without Banners, and she oversees the lynching of two of the Freys who were present at the Red Wedding.

==== King's Landing, Dragonstone, and the Eyrie ====
The smuggler-turned-knight Davos Seaworth attempts to assassinate Stannis's advisor Melisandre, a sorceress and priestess of R'hllor, blaming her for Stannis's defeat in his prior assault on King's Landing. Davos is imprisoned for treason, but at Melisandre's behest, Stannis releases Davos and appoints him Hand of the King. Melisandre uses the blood of Edric Storm, a bastard son of Stannis's late brother, King Robert, to curse the three rival kings. Balon Greyjoy's death is reported shortly thereafter.

King's Landing welcomes the Lannisters' new ally, House Tyrell, as liberators, and King Joffrey sets aside his betrothal to Sansa Stark in favor of Margaery Tyrell. Joffrey's grandfather, Tywin Lannister, the Hand of the King, compels Sansa to marry his dwarf son, Tyrion, to enable Lannister control of the North; Tyrion refuses to consummate the marriage against her will.

Margaery and Joffrey's wedding is held as planned, but during the wedding feast, Joffrey is poisoned and dies. Tyrion is accused of the murder by his sister Cersei, Joffrey's mother, and is arrested. Sansa escapes the castle with the help of Lord Petyr "Littlefinger" Baelish, who admits to her his culpability in Joffrey's death, incriminating Margaery's grandmother Olenna as well. Littlefinger and Sansa depart King's Landing for the Eyrie, home of Catelyn's sister, Lysa Arryn.

After Balon, Robb, and Joffrey die, as Melisandre predicted, Davos has Edric smuggled to safety to prevent Melisandre and Stannis from sacrificing him for the power in his blood. Davos discovers a request by the Night's Watch for aid against Mance Rayder; Stannis prepares to execute Davos for treason but changes his mind after Davos shows Stannis the Night's Watch's plea.

The spymaster Varys and Tyrion's lover Shae testify falsely against Tyrion at his trial. Prince Oberyn Martell, of the southern region of Dorne, offers to represent Tyrion in a trial by combat against Cersei's champion, Gregor Clegane, who was responsible for the death of Oberyn's sister, Elia. Oberyn nearly wins, but is ultimately killed by Gregor, although the poison on Oberyn's spear leaves Gregor dying in agony. Tyrion is sentenced to death.

Upon returning to King's Landing, Jaime gives Brienne a sword reforged from the hereditary sword of the Stark family, and sends her to find Arya and Sansa and return them home. Jaime refuses to believe that Tyrion killed Joffrey, and helps Varys free Tyrion from prison. Jaime reveals that Tyrion's first wife, Tysha, whom Tywin had gang-raped by his garrison, was not a prostitute as Tywin told him, and genuinely loved Tyrion. Outraged, Tyrion swears revenge on Jaime, Cersei, and Tywin; during his escape, he murders both Shae and Tywin before fleeing Westeros.

At the Eyrie, Sansa is disguised as an illegitimate daughter of Littlefinger, and Littlefinger and Lysa are married. Lysa reveals that Littlefinger had convinced her to poison her late husband Jon, and to pin the blame on the Lannisters, which was the catalyst for the events of A Game of Thrones. Lysa threatens to kill Sansa, thinking she is trying to seduce Littlefinger, but Littlefinger intervenes and, after revealing that he has only ever loved Catelyn, pushes Lysa to her death.

=== The North ===
The detachment of the Night's Watch under Lord Commander Jeor Mormont is attacked by undead wights and the Others, hostile inhuman creatures from the far North. The Watch suffers heavy casualties, although the steward Samwell Tarly kills one of the Others with a blade of obsidian. Soon some of the Watch mutiny and kill Mormont, but Sam escapes with the help of a wildling girl, Gilly. Sam, Gilly, and Gilly's newborn child approach the Wall, assisted by a strange figure riding an elk, whom Sam calls Coldhands. Among the dead are most of the Watch's senior leadership.

Robb's brother Bran and his friends, having escaped the Boltons' attack on the Stark castle Winterfell, are guided north by Bran's dreams of a three-eyed crow. At the Wall, Sam guides them to Coldhands and returns to the Night's Watch's headquarters at Castle Black, having sworn to keep Bran's survival secret even from Jon Snow, Bran's bastard brother and Sam's fellow Watchman.

Jon, on a mission to infiltrate the wildlings, convinces Mance that he is a deserter from the Night's Watch, and learns that the Others are driving the wildlings south towards the Wall. Jon and his captor, Ygritte, also begin a sexual relationship. After crossing the Wall, Jon escapes the wildlings and returns to Castle Black. The approaching wildling army attacks Castle Black, but Jon takes command of the defenses and repels several assaults, during which Ygritte is slain. After that, the Watch's surviving leaders, Janos Slynt and Alliser Thorne, falsely accuse Jon of treachery and send him north of the Wall to kill Mance under the pretense of a parley. As Jon is talking with Mance in the wildling camp, Stannis's army arrives, routing the Wildlings, and Mance is imprisoned. Stannis offers to legitimize Jon and make him Lord of Winterfell in exchange for his support, but Jon decides to decline Stannis's offer. Sam successfully campaigns for the Night's Watch to elect Jon its new Lord Commander.

=== Slaver's Bay ===
Daenerys Targaryen learns that large slave armies can be bought in Astapor, one of the cities of Slaver's Bay, and buys the entire host of the warrior-eunuch Unsullied by offering one of her infant dragons in exchange. Upon payment, Daenerys orders the Unsullied and the dragon to turn on the slave traders and sack the city. With the help of her maturing dragons, she frees all the slaves of Astapor, including the Unsullied. Daenerys's army then conquers the slave city of Yunkai, but the lords of the neighboring city of Meereen antagonize Daenerys by killing child slaves and burning the land to deny her resources. Consequently, Daenerys besieges the city to no avail.

Daenerys discovers two traitors in her camp: Ser Jorah Mormont, who had spied on her for the late King Robert, and Ser Barristan Selmy, the humiliated former Lord Commander of King Robert's Kingsguard. Daenerys offers both men the chance to make amends by sneaking into Meereen to free the slaves and start an uprising. Meereen soon falls and, in retaliation for the murdered child slaves, Daenerys has the city's rulers put to death. Selmy asks for Daenerys's forgiveness and becomes Lord Commander of her Queensguard, while Jorah, who refuses to admit any wrongdoing, is banished. When Daenerys learns that the council she left to govern Astapor has been overthrown, she decides to remain in Meereen to rule it herself.

== Characters ==
The tale is told through the eyes of ten main characters, plus a one-off prologue POV and a one-off epilogue POV character, for a total of 12 narrators.

- Prologue: Chett, a brother and hound-keeper of the Night's Watch
- Jaime Lannister, the Kingslayer, and the Lord Commander of the Kingsguard. Imprisoned by the Starks.
- Jon Snow, bastard son of Eddard Stark, a sworn brother of the Night's Watch
- Catelyn Stark, of House Tully, widow of Lord Eddard Stark, mother of Robb Stark
- Tyrion Lannister, youngest son of Tywin Lannister, a dwarf, brother of Jaime and Cersei Lannister
- Sansa Stark, eldest daughter of Eddard and Catelyn Stark
- Arya Stark, youngest daughter of Eddard and Catelyn Stark
- Bran Stark, son of Eddard and Catelyn Stark, heir to Winterfell and the North
- Samwell Tarly, cowardly son of Lord Randyll Tarly, a sworn brother of the Night's Watch
- Davos Seaworth, a smuggler turned knight in the service of King Stannis Baratheon
- Daenerys Targaryen, exiled Queen of Westeros, of the Targaryen dynasty
- Epilogue: Merrett Frey, a member of the numerous Frey family.

== Development ==
On October 6, 2009, Martin noted on his blog that his manuscript for A Storm of Swords had been 1521 pages in length; the initial printed hardcover came in at 992 pages. Martin did not write the Red Wedding chapters until he had completed every other chapter of the book, as he felt it was "the hardest thing I ever wrote" and that he would rather delay writing until absolutely necessary. In contrast, he referred to the chapter of Joffrey's fatal wedding as "easy and fun to write" but that he nevertheless tried to instill empathy for the painful demise of this very unpopular character and "bring home the point that this, too, was a human being who was scared and terrified and then dead".

== Reception ==
Publishers Weekly said the third volume was "one of the more rewarding examples of gigantism in contemporary fantasy. [...] The complexity of characters such as Daenerys, Arya and the Kingslayer will keep readers turning even the vast number of pages contained in this volume, for the author, like Tolkien or Jordan, makes us care about their fates. Those two fantasy greats are also evoked by Martin's ability to convey such sensual experiences as the heat of wildfire, the chill of ice, the smell of the sea and the sheer gargantuan indigestibility of the medieval banquet at its most excessive. Perhaps this saga doesn't go as far beyond the previous bounds of high fantasy as some claim, but for most readers it certainly goes far enough to command their attention."

Martin was nominated for the 2001 Hugo Award for Best Novel, but lost to J. K. Rowling for Harry Potter and the Goblet of Fire. Afterwards he made this comment about his fans: "Eat your heart out, Rowling. Maybe you have billions of dollars and my Hugo, but you don't have readers like these."

== Awards and nominations ==
- Hugo Award – Best Novel (Nominated) – (2001)
- Locus Award – Best Novel (Fantasy) (Won) – (2001)
- Nebula Award – Best Novel (Nominated) – (2001)
- Geffen Award – Best Fantasy Book (Won) – (2002)
- Ignotus Award – Best Novel (Foreign) (Won) – (2006)
