= Samwell Tarly =

- A Song of Ice and Fire character Game of Thrones character
- John Bradley as Samwell Tarly
- First appearance: Novel: A Game of Thrones (1996); Television: "Cripples, Bastards, and Broken Things" (2011)
- Last appearance: Television: "The Iron Throne" (2019)
- Created by: George R. R. Martin
- Portrayed by: John Bradley

In-universe information
- Aliases: Sam; Ser Piggy; Lady Piggy; Lord of Ham; Sam the Slayer; Black Sam
- Gender: Male
- Titles: Television: Grand Maester
- Family: House Tarly
- Significant other: Gilly (lover)
- Relatives: Randyll Tarly (father); Melessa Florent (mother); Dickon Tarly (brother); Talla Tarly (sister)

Samwell Tarly, or simply Sam, is a fictional character in the A Song of Ice and Fire series of fantasy novels by American author George R. R. Martin, and its television adaptation Game of Thrones, where the character is portrayed by English actor John Bradley.

Introduced in A Game of Thrones (1996), Samwell is the elder son of Lord Randyll Tarly of Horn Hill and his wife Lady Melessa Florent. A self-professed coward with a love for books and songs, Samwell was forced by his father to abandon his birthright and join the Night's Watch so that his younger brother could become heir to Horn Hill. While at the Wall, he meets Jon Snow and quickly becomes his closest friend and ally. Samwell subsequently appeared in the second book A Clash of Kings (1998) before becoming a point-of-view character in the third book A Storm of Swords (2000) and the fourth book A Feast for Crows (2005).

== Character ==
=== Description ===
Samwell Tarly is the elder son and firstborn child of Lord Randyll Tarly of Horn Hill and his wife Lady Melessa Florent, and has four siblings — younger sister Talla, two other unnamed sisters, and a younger brother Dickon. Through his mother, Samwell is also second cousin to Shireen Baratheon and Edric Storm, who were born to Melessa's first cousins Selyse and Delena, respectively. He has dark hair, pale eyes and a large moon-shaped face, and is very obese. Jon Snow originally comments that Sam is the fattest boy he has ever seen, and estimates him to weigh twenty stone (130 kg; 280 lb).

A gentle young man, Samwell is fond of music and songs, and prefers books over weapons, and is afraid of blood and violence, which earned intense contempt from his father Randyll, who is among the most accomplished military commanders in the Seven Kingdoms. After failing for years at instilling masculinity into Samwell, the frustrated Randyll's attentions eventually turned to grooming his more promising younger son Dickon, who showed all of the physical vigor that Samwell lacked, and decided to disown Samwell and instead have Dickon inherit the Tarly title. On Samwell's fifteenth birthday, Randyll forced him to join the Night's Watch and renounce his birthright as heir to Horn Hill, threatening death if he was to refuse.

After arriving at Castle Black, Samwell was bullied by both the trainer and other recruits for being overweight and unskilled in combat, and was often called "Ser Piggy" and "Lord of Ham". However, his new-found friendship with a sympathetic Jon Snow earns him the acceptance and protection from his peers, and Jon recommended Samwell into a comfortable position as the personal steward of Maester Aemon. While lacking his friends' fighting abilities and having self-professed cowardice, Samwell is highly intelligent, observant, resourceful and loyal, and eventually becomes Jon's most trusted sidekick. In the fourth book, Sam is sent by Jon to the Citadel at Oldtown and becomes accepted as a novice trainee supervised by Archmaester Marvyn and acolyte Alleras.

According to George R. R. Martin, the character Samwell Tarly is the most relatable to him. When asked why, Martin said in a 2014 interview: because Sam's "the fat kid who likes to read books and doesn't like to go up a lot of stairs." Just like Tarly, George R. R. Martin both “had troubled relationships with their fathers and neither is a fighter at heart” (Barnes). George R. R. Martin refused to go to the Vietnam War, because he “believed it was stupid — a sentiment that is reflected throughout the entire Song of Ice and Fire oeuvre.” (Cian) If given the option, Samwell Tarly would choose not to fight, just like Martin.

== Storylines ==
Coat of arms of the Night's Watch

=== In the books ===
Samwell Tarly is a background character in the first two novels of the series, and his actions and thoughts are interpreted through the eyes of Jon Snow. He then becomes a point of view character in the third novel A Storm of Swords and the fourth novel A Feast for Crows, with total of ten chapters told from his point of view.

==== A Game of Thrones ====
Upon arriving at the Wall, Sam is soon bullied by Ser Alliser Thorne and the fellow recruits for his weight, shyness and clumsiness in training. Jon Snow takes pity on Sam and defends him in arms training. Later on, Sam confesses his life story to Jon, who sympathizes with Sam and secretly uses his influence among the recruits (making violent threats when necessary) to protect Sam from harm. When Sam fails to progress in fight training and is not deemed worthy to join the Night's Watch, Jon persuades Maester Aemon take in Sam as a personal steward to help in the rookery and library.

Sam is the first person to notice something strange about the recovered corpses of rangers Othor and Jafer Flowers, who are actually wights sent by the Others to assassinate Lord Commander Jeor Mormont. When Jon tries to abandon the Night's Watch to join Robb Stark's army and avenge the death of his father Eddard Stark, Sam alerts their fellow recruits, who intercept Jon and convince him to not break his vows to the Night's Watch.

==== A Clash of Kings ====
Sam takes part in the Great Ranging beyond the Wall, to take care of the ravens as Lord Commander Jeor Mormont's aide. While stopping at Craster's Keep, Sam befriends one of Craster's daughter-wives, Gilly, who is pregnant and fears that Craster will sacrifice him to the Others if her child is a boy. Sam is horrified, but unable to help. Later, at camp at the Fist of the First Men, Sam and Jon's direwolf Ghost discover a cache of dragonglass weapons buried under the snow.

==== A Storm of Swords ====
The Night's Watch's camp at the Fist of the First Men comes under attack and is overrun by an army of wights sent by the Others, with Sam among the few survivors who manage to break out and flee to Craster's Keep. Sam and two fellow Watchmen, Small Paul and Grenn, become separated from the main group, and they are attacked by an Other who kills Paul. In desperation, Sam stabs it with a dragonglass dagger, killing it instantly and earning him the nickname "Sam the Slayer". Sam and Grenn then regroup with the other survivors at Craster's Keep, where Gilly gives birth to a son. Soon after, a violent mutiny breaks out, and Mormont and Craster are among those killed in the fight. Sam flees with Gilly and her infant son, and are accosted by wights before being rescued by a mysterious man, Coldhands, who looks like a wight but is friendly and supposedly a former fellow Night's Watchman. Coldhands takes them to the Nightfort and asks Sam to go find and escort Bran Stark and his party through the Wall.

Having crossed the Wall safely, Sam and Gilly then encounter a group of Night's Watchmen led by Denys Mallister and Bowen Marsh and join them on the march to Castle Black. They arrive to find that Stannis Baratheon has arrived to the Night's Watch's aid and defeated Mance Rayder's Wildling army besieging Castle Black. Due to Lord Commander Mormont's death, the Night's Watch undergoes an election for a new Lord Commander. Mallister and Cotter Pyke are the leading candidates, but Janos Slynt, who Sam believes will be a corrupt and disastrous leader, is gaining popularity. When Stannis, frustrated by the Night's Watch's messy politics, threatens to dictate a Lord Commander himself if the Watch cannot decide on a leader within the next few days, Sam decides to approach Mallister and Pyke (who despise each other) independently, claiming that Stannis plans to name the other as Lord Commander and suggesting that they both support Jon as a compromise candidate instead. Thanks to Sam's machinations, both Mallister and Pyke agree to offer their endorsements and Jon is elected the 998th Lord Commander with an overwhelming majority vote.

==== A Feast for Crows ====
Jon sends Sam to Oldtown to be trained as a Maester, accompanied by another brother Dareon (who is appointed as a recruiter), Maester Aemon (whom Jon fears will be sacrificed by Melisandre for his royal blood) and Gilly and her baby. During the voyage to Braavos, Gilly grows despondent, and Sam realises that Jon had swapped Gilly's baby with Mance Rayder's newborn son lest he be sacrificed as well. Aemon falls ill during the voyage and they are forced to spend their money on a healer and lodging in Braavos. In Braavos, Sam also encounters a disguised Arya Stark, though he does not realise her identity. Aemon hears of his great-grandniece Daenerys Targaryen and her dragons, and comes to believe that she fulfills the prophecy of a "prince that was promised", asking them to inform the Citadel. Dareon decides to desert, and Sam fights him before being thrown into a canal. He is rescued by a Summer Islander, Xhondo, who offers Sam and Gilly passage to Oldtown aboard his merchant ship. Aemon ultimately passes away in the journey, and Sam and Gilly briefly become lovers in their grief.

Sam plans to send Gilly to Horn Hill under his mother's care, with the baby passed off as Sam's bastard. Meanwhile, Sam arrives at Oldtown to meet with Archmaester Marwyn, telling him of the late Aemon's request regarding Daenerys. Marwyn resolves to travel to Slaver's Bay to meet with Daenerys, ordering Sam to keep his story secret from the other maesters and entrusting Sam's care in the hand of acolyte Alleras. Sam also meets two fellow novices Leo Tyrell (whom Sam knows from childhood, though unpleasantly) and a pale boy called Pate (towards whom Sam intuitively feels uncomfortable).

=== In the show ===
==== Season 1 ====
Sam is quickly identified as being soft and weak by Castle Black's master-at-arms Ser Alliser Thorne, and suffers in sword-training until Jon Snow convinces the other new recruits to go easy on him. Sam is assigned to the order of stewards, to serve Maester Aemon. When Jon tries to abandon the Night's Watch after hearing of his father's execution, Sam follows with Pyp and Grenn. They convince Jon to remain loyal to the Night's Watch.

==== Season 2 ====
Sam joins the Night's Watch in the Great Ranging. Along the journey, the party rests at Craster's Keep, where Sam encounters and falls in love with Craster's pregnant daughter-wife Gilly. While camping at the Fist of the First Men, Sam discovers a cache of weapons made from dragonglass. While Sam is out collecting dung for fires, the White Walkers march on the Fist of the First Men. Sam is unable to outrun the army of the dead, but for unknown reasons their leader spares Sam.

==== Season 3 ====
Sam and the survivors of the resulting massacre flee back to Craster's Keep. Sam witnesses Gilly give birth to a baby boy, whose gender Sam and Gilly realize they must keep secret to prevent Craster from giving the baby to the White Walkers. A brawl later breaks out among Craster and the Night's Watch, and Sam flees with Gilly and the baby. They are followed by a White Walker who tries to take the baby, but Sam kills it by stabbing it with a dragonglass dagger. Sam and Gilly pass through the Wall at the Nightfort, where they discover Jon's half-brother Bran Stark and his party, headed beyond the Wall. Sam is unable to persuade them to come to Castle Black instead but promises not to tell Jon their destination.

Arriving back at Castle Black, Sam warns Aemon of the advancing White Walkers, and Aemon has Sam send the warning throughout the Seven Kingdoms. Later, Jon returns to Castle Black, gravely wounded and disguised as a Wildling. Sam recognises Jon and orders him to be attended to.

==== Season 4 ====
Sam reveals to Jon that Bran is alive and headed beyond the Wall. Sam decides to send Gilly to Mole's Town to work as a maid in the brothel, as he fears for her safety at Castle Black. Mole's Town is attacked by the Wildlings, who slaughter the entire populace of the town. Sam is distraught, unaware that Gilly and her baby had been spared by Ygritte. Gilly later makes it to Castle Black moments before the Wildlings attack. Sam participates in the battle and manages to kill the Thenn warg.

==== Season 5 ====
When the Night's Watch convenes to choose their new Lord Commander, Sam speaks up to nominate Jon, who is ultimately elected. Sam spends his time researching the White Walkers' weaknesses and tending to the dying Maester Aemon, and he comforts Aemon in his final moments as he dies of old age. Later, Sam is beaten while defending Gilly from two Night's Watchmen who attempt to rape her, but he and Gilly are saved by Jon's direwolf Ghost. Gilly tends to Sam's wounds, and the couple finally consummates their relationship. After Jon returns from Hardhome, Sam entreats him to send him to the Citadel in Oldtown in order to train as a Maester, while also taking Gilly and her baby to safety.

==== Season 6 ====
As women are banned from the Citadel, Sam intends to leave Gilly and Little Sam at the Tarly seat, Horn Hill, although he warns Gilly to hide her Wildling heritage due to his father's bigotry towards the Wildlings. At dinner with Sam's family, Randyll insults Sam's lack of fighting prowess. Gilly defends Sam by revealing that he killed a White Walker while traveling south toward the Wall, in doing so accidentally revealing that she is a Wildling. Although disgusted, Randyll acquiesces to Sam and Lady Tarly's request to let Gilly and Little Sam stay at Horn Hill, but he says Gilly will be a servant, and he forbids Sam from ever returning to Horn Hill. Sam decides to take Gilly and Little Sam with him to the Citadel, and he steals House Tarly's Valyrian steel sword Heartsbane. They travel on to Oldtown, where Sam is scheduled to explain events at Castle Black to the Archmaester. While Sam waits, he is permitted to peruse the Citadel's library and is awestruck by the library's expanse.

==== Season 7 ====
During Sam's early days at the Citadel, he is assigned to menial tasks. The only person who believes his account of the White Walkers' return is Archmaester Ebrose. However, Ebrose refuses to let Sam access forbidden textbooks to learn more about the White Walkers, as Ebrose does not consider them a threat serious enough to break with protocol. However, Sam steals a key to take the books back to his and Gilly's quarters. In reading the books, he discovers the location of a large deposit of dragonglass in a map of Dragonstone and sends word to Jon, now King in the North, of its existence.

Sam encounters Jeor Mormont's son Jorah, who is infected by the terminal disease greyscale. Sam discovers a cure for greyscale in an old medical text. Although Ebrose forbids him from attempting it, Sam treats Jorah anyway, out of gratitude for Jeor's saving his life. Sam is successful in curing Jorah, who is discharged from the Citadel. Ebrose is grudgingly impressed, but as punishment for Sam's disobedience tasks him to transcribe papers in danger of decomposing.

Sam overhears Ebrose and several other maesters discussing a warning sent by Bran about the White Walkers' march on the Wall, and is dismayed by the maesters' skepticism. While reading the papers in Sam's quarters, Gilly discovers from a recently deceased High Septon's journal that Rhaegar Targaryen had his marriage to Elia Martell annulled and married Lyanna Stark in secret, but Sam does not realize the significance of this information due to Gilly's having mispronounced Rhaegar. Annoyed at being unable to help in the battle against the White Walkers from the Citadel, Sam steals scrolls pertaining to the White Walkers and leaves Oldtown with Gilly and Little Sam.

Sam and his family arrive at Winterfell in the season finale, where Sam is reunited with Bran. When Bran tells Sam that Jon is the bastard son of his aunt Lyanna Stark with Rhaegar Targaryen, Sam recalls the record detailing the annulment Rhaegar received in order to marry another woman and tells Bran of his discovery. Bran uses his greenseeing abilities to witness the wedding, and discovers that Jon is the trueborn son of Rhaegar Targaryen and Lyanna Stark, heir to the Iron Throne.

==== Season 8 ====
Sam is approached by Daenerys Targaryen, who thanks him for saving Jorah's life. However, Sam is grief-stricken when Daenerys reveals that she executed Randyll and Dickon for refusing to pledge fealty to her. Bran tells Sam to reveal to Jon his true parentage. As the preparations are being made for battle against the approaching army of White Walkers, Sam presents the Valyrian Steel sword of House Tarly, Heartsbane, to Jorah. Sam participates in the battle against the undead and is saved by Edd. After witnessing Edd being killed by a wight, Sam flees back into Winterfell. He ultimately survives the Long Night and participates in the funeral ceremony afterwards. When Jon travels south with Daenerys' army, Sam bids him farewell; it is revealed that Gilly is pregnant with Sam's son.

Westeros is left without a ruler when, after Daenerys wrests control of King's Landing from Cersei Lannister, she burns the surrendered populace of the city, during which Cersei is also killed. Jon fails to dissuade Daenerys from further destruction and ultimately assassinates her. Following Tyrion Lannister's arrest and Jon's imprisonment, Sam journeys south to participate in the council to determine the future of the Seven Kingdoms. Sam suggests holding an election where all the people of Westeros are permitted to vote for the next ruler, but the idea is mocked and dismissed. Tyrion suggests Bran as King and Sam is the first to agree to Bran's crowning. Sam is appointed as Grand Maester in Bran's Small Council.

=== Family tree of House Tarly ===
		Randyll		Melessa Florent
Samwell	Talla		Daughter		Daughter	Dickon	Eleanor; Mooton

== TV adaptation ==
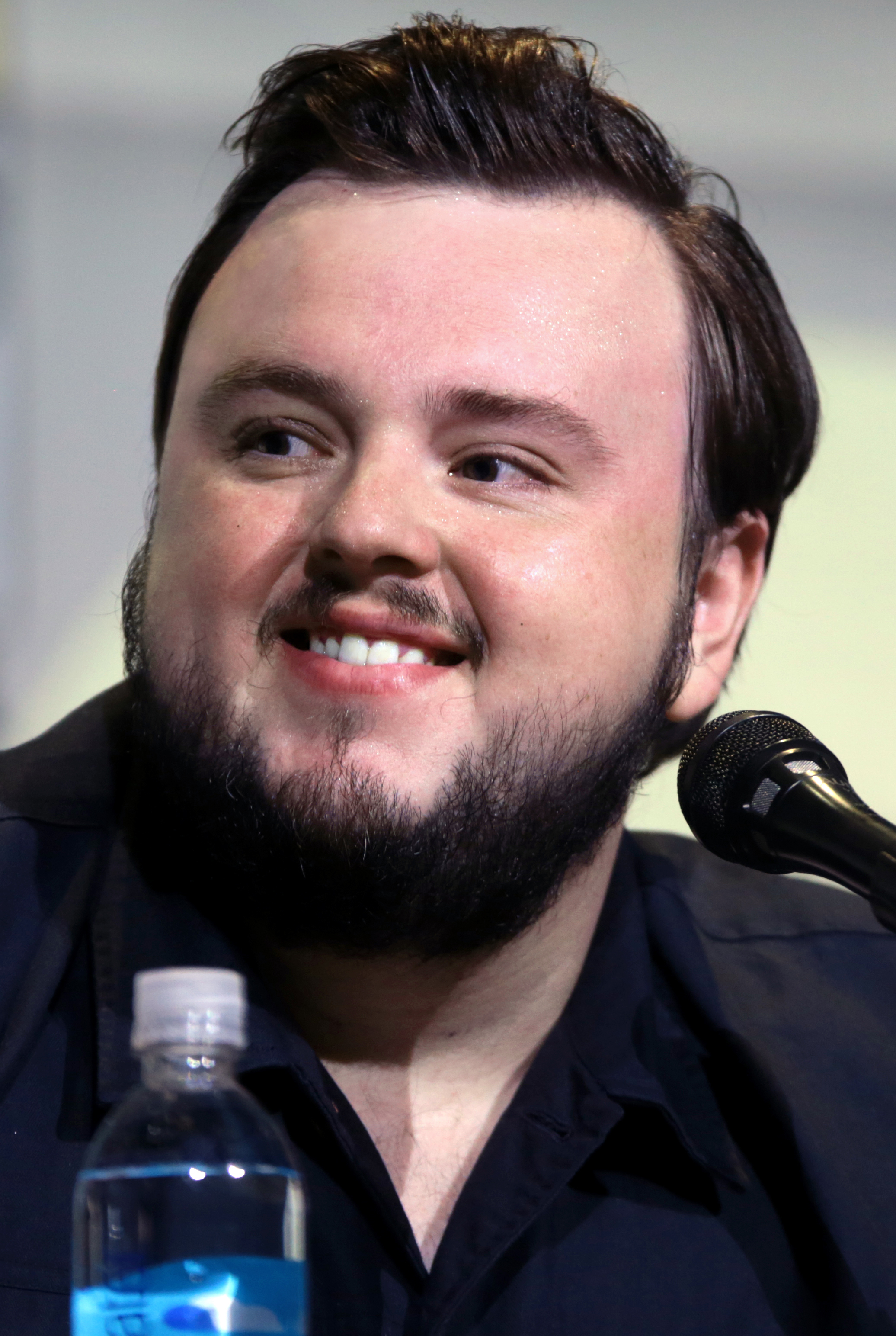
John Bradley plays the role of Samwell Tarly in the television series.

Samwell Tarly is played by John Bradley in the television adaption of the book series. Samwell Tarly appeared for the first time in season 1 episode 4, as a new recruit of the Night's Watch and a self-described coward. It was Bradley's first professional appearance after graduating from The Manchester Metropolitan School of Theatre. The scene used in the auditions belonged to "Cripples, Bastards, and Broken Things," with Sam explaining to Jon how Sam's father forced him to "take the black" (meaning join the Night's Watch). According to author and executive producer George R. R. Martin, Bradley delivered "a heartbreaking performance." When asked which character he personally would be on the show, Martin said of Samwell Tarly, "I love Sam, too. He's a great character - Tyrion might be who I want to be, but Sam is probably closer to who I actually am. The fat kid who likes to read books and doesn't like to go up a lot of stairs."

Remarking on the character's sex life with Gilly, Bradley said:

I think Sam would just happily accept more of the same. He's not one of the people that tries to inject exotica into his sex life; Sam thinks about sex the way that most people think about space. It goes on. He has nothing to do with it. He's fascinated by it in a childlike way.
