= Jon Snow (character) =

Character in A Song of Ice and Fire and Game of Thrones

- A Song of Ice and Fire character Game of Thrones character
- Kit Harington as Jon Snow
- First appearance: Literature: A Game of Thrones (1996); Television: "Winter Is Coming" (2011)
- First game: Game of Thrones (Telltale Games)
- Last appearance: Television: "The Iron Throne" (2019)
- Created by: George R. R. Martin
- Adapted by: David Benioff & D.B. Weiss (Game of Thrones)
- Portrayed by: Kit Harington (Game of Thrones)
- Voiced by: Kit Harington (video game); Tobias Weatherburn (Game of Thrones: Kingsroad)
- Motion capture: Kit Harington (video game)

In-universe information
- Full name: Television: Aegon Targaryen
- Aliases: Lord Snow; The Bastard of Winterfell; The White Wolf
- Gender: Male
- Titles: 998th Lord Commander of the Night's Watch; King in the North (fulfilled role in television, unknowingly naturalized heir in the novels); In TV also: Warden of the North
- Family: House Stark; In TV also: House Targaryen
- Significant others: Ygritte; In TV also: Daenerys Targaryen
- Relatives: Ned Stark (father); Robb Stark (half-brother); Sansa Stark (half-sister); Arya Stark (half-sister); Bran Stark (half-brother); Rickon Stark (half-brother); Benjen Stark (uncle); Lyanna Stark (aunt); In TV also: Rhaegar Targaryen (father); Viserys Targaryen (uncle); Daenerys Targaryen (aunt); Maester Aemon (great-great-uncle); Aerys II Targaryen (grandfather)

Jon Snow is a main character in the A Song of Ice and Fire series of epic fantasy novels by American author George R. R. Martin, and its HBO television adaptation Game of Thrones, in which he is portrayed by Kit Harington. In the novels, he is a prominent point of view character, and one of the most popular characters in the series. The New York Times cites him as one of the author's finest creations. Jon is a main character in the TV series, and his storyline in the season 5 finale generated a strong reaction among viewers. Speculation about the character's parentage has also been a popular topic of discussion among fans of both the books and the TV series.

Jon is introduced in 1996's A Game of Thrones as the illegitimate son of Ned Stark, Lord of Winterfell in the North of Westeros. Knowing his prospects are limited by his status as a bastard, Jon joins the Night's Watch, who guard the far northern borders from the wildlings living beyond The Wall. In A Clash of Kings (1998), Jon joins a scouting party investigating the growing threat from the otherworldly "Others" beyond the Wall, and infiltrates the wildlings. Jon learns of their plans to invade Westeros in A Storm of Swords (2000), and falls in love with the wildling woman Ygritte. Jon betrays the wildlings and Ygritte, returns to defend the Night's Watch against the wildlings' invasion, and is elected Lord Commander of the Watch. He appears briefly in A Feast for Crows (2005) and returns as a prominent character in A Dance with Dragons (2011), in which he works to negotiate an alliance between the Night's Watch and the wildlings against the Others; his policies are met with hostility by some among the Watch, and he is left for dead in a mutiny at the novel's end following a desired attempt to break his vows to fight House Bolton.

In the Game of Thrones television series, Jon's storyline initially follows the character's plot arc from the novel series. Seasons six through eight continue on from the events of Martin's latest published installment, detailing Jon's resurrection, and revealing him to have been born Aegon Targaryen, the legitimate son of Rhaegar Targaryen and Lyanna Stark, therefore possessing a stronger claim to the Iron Throne than his aunt Daenerys Targaryen. For the role, Harington was nominated for multiple accolades, including a Golden Globe Award for Best Actor – Television Series Drama in 2019, two Emmy Awards for Outstanding Supporting Actor in a Drama Series and Outstanding Lead Actor in a Drama Series in 2016 and 2019, and two Critics' Choice Television Awards, for Best Supporting Actor in a Drama Series and Best Actor in a Drama Series, respectively.

== Character ==
=== Description ===
In A Game of Thrones, Jon Snow is introduced as the 14-year-old illegitimate son of Eddard "Ned" Stark, Lord of Winterfell, and half-brother to Robb, Sansa, Arya, Bran and Rickon. Jon is described as having strong Stark features with a lean build, long face, dark brown hair, and dark grey eyes. Jon has the surname "Snow" (customarily used for illegitimate noble children in the North) and is resented by Ned's wife Catelyn, who views him as a constant reminder of Ned's infidelity. Jon is the same age as Robb and enjoys a warm relationship with his siblings, particularly the tomboy Arya (who resembles Jon and like him, does not feel like she fits in). Ned treats Jon as much like his other children as propriety and his honor will allow. Still, as somewhat of an outsider, Jon has learned to be independent and to fend for himself when necessary. Jon idolizes his father, but is wounded by Ned's refusal to tell him about his mother. At the beginning of the story, Jon adopts the albino direwolf that he names Ghost. He later finds that at times, he can "inhabit" the wolf and share its experiences.

David Orr of The New York Times describes Jon as "a complex, thoughtful and basically good character". David Benioff and D. B. Weiss, the creators and executive producers of the television adaptation of the series, explain that Jon is one of several characters in the series who must "face hard truths about the world they live in, and adapt themselves to those truths" because, "The struggle many of them face is how to do that without losing their grip on who they are." Ned Stark teaches all his children about leadership, selflessness, duty and honor. Following his father's example becomes more difficult as Jon faces challenges to his identity as a man, a Stark, and a brother of the Night's Watch. Benioff and Weiss note that "Jon Snow tries to live with honor, while knowing that honor often gets his family members murdered." Writing for Variety about the season 6 episode "Battle of the Bastards", Laura Prudom suggests that Jon "has the same shortcomings" as his father: "he fights with honor against opponents who are all too willing to use that predictable morality against him".

Jon is a prominent point of view character in the novels, and has been called one of Martin's "finest creations". Jon is introduced as the illegitimate son of a Northern Lord who, realizing he is an outsider in his own family, follows his uncle to the far north and accepts the honorable duty of serving in the Night's Watch. But as much as he is a second-class Stark at home, initially his fellow recruits and brothers of the Watch set him apart as privileged and aloof. Jon adapts, soon proving himself to be wise, compassionate, and a natural leader. Over the course of the series, Jon's loyalty to the Watch and its vows, his family, and even Westeros itself are tested as he becomes embroiled in the efforts of the wildlings from Beyond the Wall to force their way back into the Seven Kingdoms. He lives among them as a spy for the Watch, sympathetic to their cause and becoming romantically involved with the tenacious Ygritte. However, he ultimately betrays them to defend The Wall. Later, as the newest Lord Commander of the Night's Watch, he pursues an alliance with the wildlings.

Several reviews of 2011's A Dance with Dragons noted the return to the narrative of Jon, Daenerys Targaryen and Tyrion Lannister, the three popular characters whom fans had missed most from the previous volume, A Feast for Crows. These "favorites" had last been featured 11 years before in Martin's A Storm of Swords. In A Dance with Dragons, Jon's leadership of the Night's Watch is complicated by several unprecedented challenges, including a wildling alliance, the demands of would-be-king Stannis Baratheon and the conflicting factions developing within the Watch itself. The New York Times notes that "Jon’s leadership is the best hope of Westeros, so naturally he’s in imminent danger throughout A Dance With Dragons." James Hibberd of Entertainment Weekly called Jon's final chapter in A Dance with Dragons "a harsh chapter in terms of fan expectations. You go from this total high of Jon giving this rousing speech about going after the evil Ramsay Bolton, to this utter low of his men turning against him." Jon's presence in the forthcoming volume The Winds of Winter is uncertain.

When asked what he thought was "Jon's biggest 'mistake'", Martin replied:

Were they mistakes? I guess they were mistakes in some ways since they led to him losing control of part of his group. But it might have been wise and necessary decisions in terms of protecting the realm and dealing with the threat of the White Walkers. I'm a huge student of history, and all through history there’s always this question of what's the right decision. You look back with benefit of hindsight at a battle that was lost and say, 'The losing general was such an idiot.' Was Napoleon a genius for all the battles he won? Or an idiot for losing at Waterloo? Partly I'm reacting to a lot of the fantasy that has come before this. Ruling is difficult whether you're a Lord Commander of the Night’s Watch or the King of England. These are hard decisions and each have consequences. We're looking at Jon trying to take control of Night's Watch and deal with the wildlings and the threat beyond The Wall.

=== Parentage ===
The identity of Jon's mother has created much speculation among readers of the series, and guessing her identity was the test Martin gave Benioff and Weiss when they approached him in March 2006 about adapting his novels into a TV series. In the novels, characters believe that she could be a servant named Wylla, or the noblewoman Ashara Dayne. The popular fan theory—called R+L=J, an abbreviation of "Rhaegar + Lyanna = Jon"—proposes that Jon is not the son of Ned at all, but is actually the son of Rhaegar Targaryen and Ned's younger sister Lyanna Stark, and Ned feigned dishonor and claimed the nephew to be his own child in order to protect Jon from harm.

Though the character is presented as the illegitimate son of Ned Stark, David Orr voiced the doubt of some readers when he wrote in The New York Times in 2011, "Jon Snow is presented as the illegitimate son of the Stark patriarch, although it's uncertain whether Stark is indeed his father." Actor Sean Bean, who portrays Ned in the HBO television series, said when asked in a 2014 interview about returning to the series to appear in flashbacks, "I've definitely got some unfinished business that needs to be resolved there. I'm obviously not Jon Snow's dad. And you need that to be revealed at some point, don't you?" The uncertainty arises from anecdotal evidence in the texts interpreted by readers to connect the mysterious maternity of Ned's son with the vague backstory of his sister Lyanna.

As recounted by Ned in A Game of Thrones, at a tourney years before the events of the novel, Rhaegar had shown public favor to Lyanna in the presence of his own wife, the Dornish princess Elia Martell. When Rhaegar and Lyanna disappeared a year later, her father Rickard and eldest brother Brandon confronted Rhaegar's father, the "Mad King" Aerys Targaryen, demanding that his son return the abducted Lyanna. Aerys had Rickard and Brandon brutally executed for their insolence, inciting Ned and his friend Robert Baratheon, Lord of Storm's End and Lyanna's betrothed, to rebel against Aerys. In what later became known as Robert's Rebellion, Aerys was overthrown, and Rhaegar was killed by Robert in single combat. After a bloody battle against three of Aerys' Kingsguard protecting the Tower of Joy in Dorne, Ned found Lyanna inside, in a "bed of blood." She died shortly after eliciting a promise from Ned. Once the war was won, he returned to Winterfell with his supposed illegitimate son Jon.

The R+L=J theory posits that rather than Rhaegar kidnapping Lyanna, they fell in love and ran away together. While living in the Tower of Joy for a year, they conceived a child—Jon. Rhaegar was killed in battle by Robert, and Lyanna died in childbirth. Ned promised Lyanna on her deathbed to claim the baby as his own to protect him from Robert, who sought to exterminate all Targaryens out of hatred and to secure his claim to the throne.

HBO's Game of Thrones has included many of the "hints" identified by this theory in its adaptation. In the season 6 finale, "The Winds of Winter", Bran Stark has a vision of the past which shows Ned reuniting with a dying Lyanna in the Tower of Joy. Lyanna makes him promise to protect her son—Jon. An infographic subsequently posted on the HBO-controlled website MakingGameofThrones.com confirmed Rhaegar as Jon's father. Journalists later commented on the significance of two plot points in the season 7 episode "Eastwatch". One of Daenerys Targaryen's dragons, Drogon, approaches Jon calmly and allows the King in the North to pet him, seemingly recognizing him as a Targaryen. Later, Gilly learns from a book at the Citadel that a High Septon annulled Rhaegar's marriage, and married him to someone else in Dorne, suggesting the possibility that Jon is the legitimate son of Rhaegar and Lyanna. The season 7 finale episode "The Dragon and the Wolf" confirmed that Jon is indeed the legitimate son of Rhaegar and Lyanna, and that his birth name is actually Aegon Targaryen.

== Storylines ==
=== A Game of Thrones ===
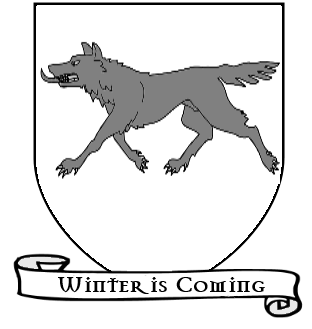
Coat of arms of the Night's Watch and House Stark

Jon Snow is first introduced in A Game of Thrones (1996) as he and his five siblings adopt six orphaned direwolf cubs. Jon takes the runt of the litter, a white cub that he names Ghost. Known by all as Ned Stark's illegitimate son, and with Ned's wife, Catelyn, despising him, Jon has always felt removed from the rest of the Stark family. He resolves to join the Night's Watch, for his status as a bastard prevents him from holding lands or marrying into a good family, whereas a life in the Night's Watch would offer opportunities for advancement. At the Wall, the other recruits resent Jon's aura of superiority, but he makes amends by helping them master swordplay. He also befriends Samwell Tarly, a cowardly lordling who, despite being helpless with weapons, is keenly intelligent. Jon's independence and his compassion for the recruits invite the ire of the harsh master-at-arms Alliser Thorne, who sees Jon as a threat to his authority. Jon gains the notice of Lord Commander Jeor Mormont, who names Jon his personal steward and squire and grooms Jon for command. After a dead Night's Watch brother brought back from beyond the Wall reanimates as an undead wight, Jon saves Mormont's life by killing the creature with Ghost. In thanks, Mormont gives Jon House Mormont's ancestral sword, Longclaw, made of Valyrian steel with a wolf's head pommel custom-made for Jon. However, Jon is torn between his vows to the Night's Watch and his loyalty to his family after learning of Ned's execution and his half-brother Robb's march south for justice after Ned is beheaded on false charges. Jon resolves to desert the Night's Watch and join Robb, but his friends convince Jon to remain loyal to his vows. Mormont is aware of Jon's attempt at desertion, but convinces Jon that the new threat beyond the Wall is more concerning than events in the south. Mormont then orders a great ranging beyond the Wall, with Jon accompanying him.

=== A Clash of Kings ===
In 1998's A Clash of Kings, Mormont leads a party of Night's Watch rangers beyond the Wall to investigate the disappearance of Jon's uncle Benjen Stark, assess the intentions of the wildling leader Mance Rayder, and learn more of the threat posed by the Others. Jon is sent out with a scouting party led by Qhorin Halfhand. On the journey, Jon comes upon a wildling lookout and takes the spearwife Ygritte captive; though told to kill her, Jon lets her escape. Jon and Qhorin are subsequently captured by the wildlings. Facing execution by Mance Rayder's hand, Qhorin commands Jon to infiltrate the wildlings and learn their plans at any cost. Jon pretends to disavow the Night's Watch, and the wildlings force him to fight Qhorin to the death to earn their trust. With Qhorin's silent consent, Jon kills him with the aid of Ghost.

=== A Storm of Swords ===
As A Storm of Swords (2000) begins, Jon has infiltrated the wildlings and marches with their host. He learns that Mance Rayder intends to breach the Wall and march south to escape the Others, crushing the Night's Watch if necessary. Jon breaks his vow of celibacy with Ygritte and becomes torn between his growing feelings for her and his loyalty to the Night's Watch. After climbing over the Wall with Ygritte, Jon deserts them to warn the Watch of the impending attack. He helps defend Castle Black against the wildlings' attack despite his injuries. Ygritte is killed in battle, leaving Jon stricken with grief. Jon takes over Donal Noye's command of the Wall's defense after Noye is killed. When Thorne and Janos Slynt arrive at Castle Black, they attempt to have Jon executed for desertion. Jon is freed after the judges are convinced of his loyalty, but Thorne orders Jon to kill Mance under the pretense of parley. As Jon negotiates with Mance, Stannis Baratheon arrives with his army and defeats the wildlings. Stannis offers to legitimize Jon and declare him Lord of Winterfell if he will align the North with Stannis. Although greatly tempted by the prospect of becoming a true lord of House Stark, Jon ultimately chooses to remain loyal to his Night's Watch vows. Due to Sam's machinations, Jon is elected as the new Lord Commander in a landslide victory.

=== A Feast for Crows and A Dance with Dragons ===
Jon is not a point-of-view character in 2005's A Feast for Crows, but he appears briefly from Sam's perspective as he sends the latter away from Castle Black with the Watch's Maester Aemon and Mance's newborn son to protect them from being sacrificed by the Red Priestess of R'hllor Melisandre. Jon also assigns Sam the specific task of traveling to the Citadel in Oldtown to become a maester, so he can better understand the threat of the Others and eventually succeed Maester Aemon.

In A Dance with Dragons (2011), Jon prepares the defense of the realm against the Others. He attempts to juggle the integration of the wildlings, growing unrest within the Night's Watch, and Stannis's attempts to use the Watch in his war for the Iron Throne, while trying to maintain the Watch's strict political neutrality. When Slynt openly defies Jon's orders multiple times, Jon executes him, which increases tension between factions. Later, he advises Stannis against attacking the Dreadfort. Jon plans to settle the wildlings in sparsely populated regions of the North and allows some of them to join the Watch to garrison the many abandoned Night's Watch fortresses. Many members of the Watch dislike the idea of allowing their ancient enemies through the Wall and welcoming them into their ranks. Jon learns that his sister Arya is being married to Ramsay Bolton to secure the Bolton hold on Winterfell, but in truth, the bride is Jeyne Poole posing as Arya. Jon allows Melisandre to send Mance to rescue her. He later receives a letter from Ramsay claiming that Stannis, who marched on Winterfell, has been defeated and that Mance is a prisoner. Ramsay demands hostages, threatening to march on the Wall and kill Jon if he is defied. Finally pushed to his breaking point, Jon instead decides that he will seek out and kill Ramsay himself, openly compromising his neutrality, but he is stabbed by his Night's Watch brothers in a mutiny.

=== The Winds of Winter ===
Jon's presence in the forthcoming volume The Winds of Winter is uncertain; when asked in 2011 by Entertainment Weekly "Why did you kill Jon Snow?", author George R. R. Martin responded, "Oh, you think he's dead, do you?" Asked later whether Jon was killed or would survive, Martin responded with a laugh, "I will not comment on that." In a 2026 interview with The Hollywood Reporter, Martin said he still writes Jon Snow point-of-view chapters for The Winds of Winter when other character sections stall.

=== Family tree ===
Descendants of Rickard Stark

Rickard	Lyarra
Brandon	Catelyn; Tully	Eddard	Lyanna (Note: In season 7 of the TV series Game of Thrones, Jon is revealed to be the son of Rhaegar Targaryen and Lyanna.)	Benjen
Robb	Jeyne; Westerling	Sansa	Tyrion; Lannister	Arya	Brandon	Rickon	Jon; Snow

== TV adaptation ==
=== Overview ===
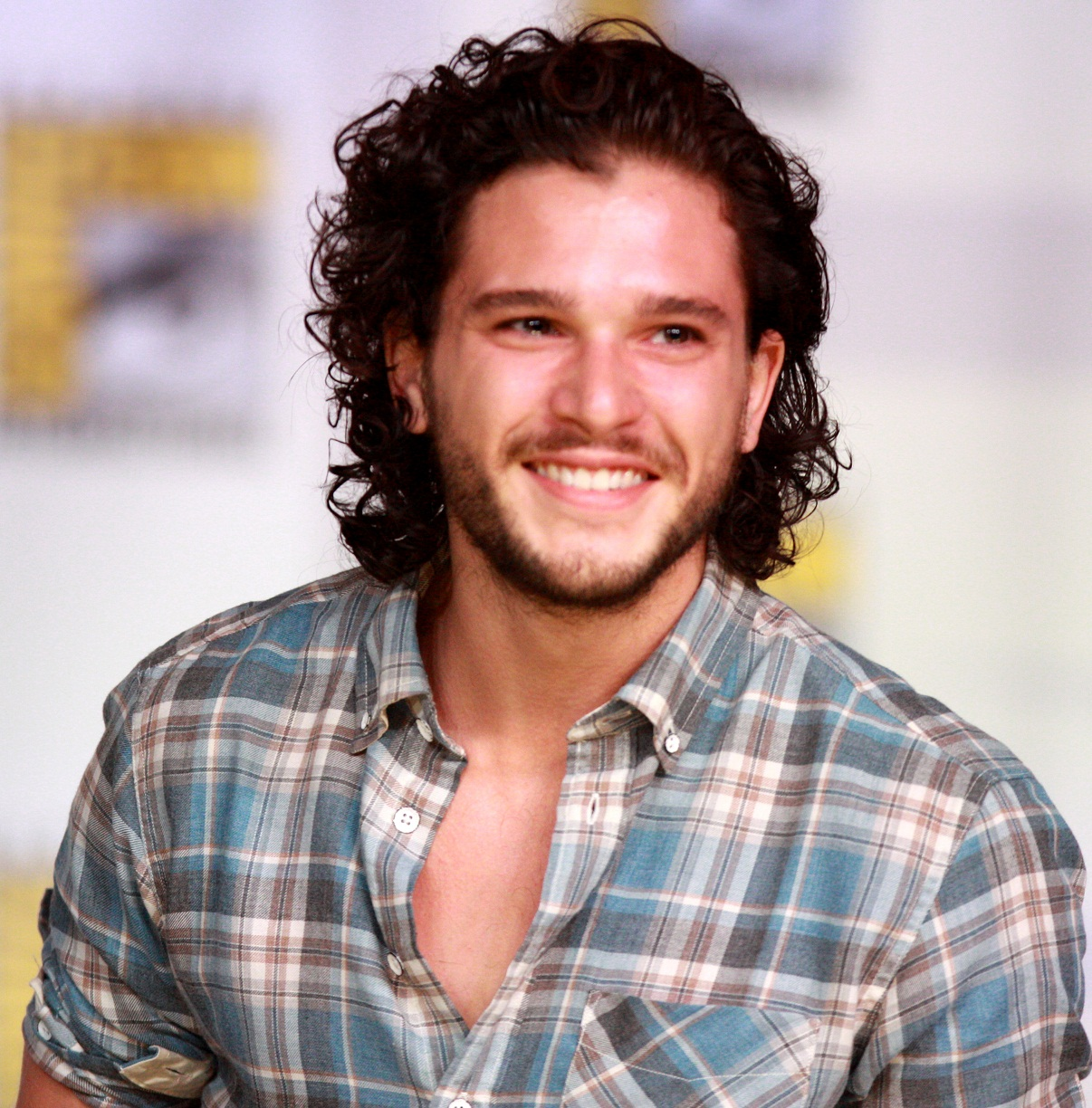
Kit Harington plays the role of Jon Snow in the television series.

Martin told Rolling Stone in 2014 that some early inquiries he received about adapting A Song of Ice and Fire suggested identifying the story's "important character" and focusing on that individual plotline, with Jon and Daenerys Targaryen being the two most popular choices. Martin was not interested in sacrificing so much of the overall story. When the pilot for the HBO adaptation went into production years later, one of the first parts cast was Jon, with Kit Harington announced in the role in July 2009. Alfie Allen and Iwan Rheon had also auditioned for the role, and were brought into the show to play Theon Greyjoy and Ramsay Snow instead, respectively. In October 2014, Harington and several other key cast members, all contracted for six seasons of the series, renegotiated their deals to include a potential seventh season and salary increases for seasons five, six, and seven. The Hollywood Reporter called the raises "huge", noting that the deal would make the performers "among the highest-paid actors on cable TV". Deadline Hollywood put the number for season five at "close to $300,000 an episode" for each actor, and The Hollywood Reporter wrote in June 2016 that the performers would each be paid "upward of $500,000 per episode" for seasons seven and the potential eight. In 2017, Harington became one of the highest paid actors on television and may have earned £1.2 million per episode for the show.

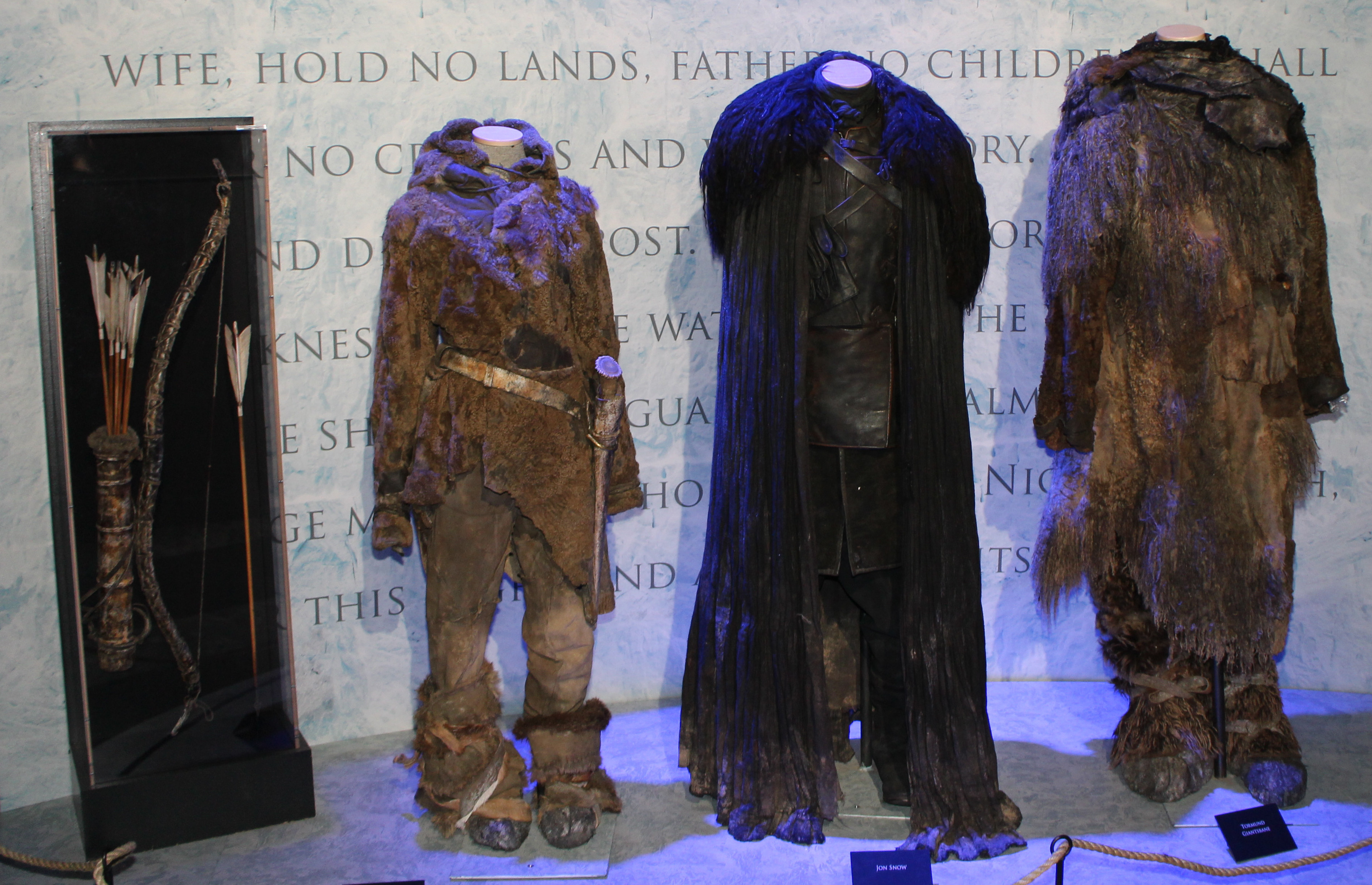
The costumes of Ygritte, Jon Snow, and Tormund Giantsbane in the show

As the series premiered, TV Guide called Harington a "soulful heartthrob" whose Jon is idolized by his younger siblings and who "seeks purpose" by joining the Night's Watch. Creators David Benioff and D. B. Weiss later noted that Jon "tries to live with honor, while knowing that honor often gets his family members murdered". They explained that he is one of several characters in the series who must "face hard truths about the world they live in, and adapt themselves to those truths. The struggle many of them face is how to do that without losing their grip on who they are." Matt Fowler of IGN wrote in 2013 that while Jon and Daenerys' storylines in season 1 and season 2 "felt very separate" from the rest of the series' plot, for the first time in season 3, "Jon's entire situation felt incorporated into the larger picture." Fowler also added that Jon's "oath-breaking romance with Ygritte added a lot of heat to the story". In May 2015, International Business Times called Jon "clearly the most popular character" of the series.

In a 2015 interview, Benioff said, "The problem with Jon is, he’s not a cautious man. It's the problem with him, and also the reason we love him. He is a hero, but heroes are inherently incautious." Weiss added, "At the end of the day, Jon is his father’s son, he’s a person who’s honorable to a fault and does the right thing even when the right thing is extremely dangerous to him personally." In the June 2015 season 5 finale "Mother's Mercy", Jon is stabbed to death by Alliser Thorne and several men of the Night's Watch after being labeled a traitor. With Martin's 2011 novel A Dance with Dragons vague on Jon's fate, Harington confirmed the character's death in an interview with Entertainment Weekly, saying "I've been told I’m dead. I'm dead. I’m not coming back next season." He added, "I loved how they brought [the orphan boy] Olly in to be the person who kills me. I love how the storyline with Thorne was wrapped up." Benioff also said of the episode:

This is obviously a big deal, the death of Jon Snow. This is something we've been thinking about for a long long time, and Alliser kills him, it's kind of like, it's a bad guy killing a good guy. But when it's Olly holding the knife … Olly's not a bad guy. Olly's a kid who’s seen just way too much horror way too early, and he makes a decision that's a really hard decision for him but you understand where he's coming from ... It's one of those great conflicts that makes us love the books and this saga, is that it's, ultimately it's not just about good vs evil, it's about people of good intentions who come into conflict with each other because they have very different views of the world, and unfortunately it did not work out well for Jon Snow in this case.

Writing for The New York Times, Jeremy Egner called Jon's demise "the biggest death on the show" since Ned Stark's beheading in season 1. Amid strong fan reaction over Jon's death on social media, immediately following the episode journalists began theorizing how the show could resurrect the character. Nate Jones of Vulture noted:

It's easy to see what [other characters'] deaths meant for the series' sprawling narrative: Ned's execution sent the Stark kids adrift in a universe where there was nobody looking out for them, while Robb's murder was the final death knell for the hopes that the saga would ever have a traditional 'happy' ending. What would be accomplished, narratively, by getting rid of Jon permanently right now?

A July 2015 sighting of Harington arriving in Belfast, a primary filming location for the series where other actors were arriving for season 6 script read-throughs, prompted further speculation about the character's return. However, a story in Vanity Fair pointed out that Charles Dance had been seen in Belfast the previous year after his character Tywin Lannister's death as well, and he only appeared in the first episode of the subsequent season as a corpse. A season 6 Game of Thrones promotional poster released in November 2015 featured a bloodied Jon.

Jon is resurrected by Melisandre in "Home", the May 2016 second episode of season 6. Though calling it a "predictable move" for a television series, David Sims of The Atlantic praised the plot development as "the right choice" for the show's narrative. In a subsequent interview with Entertainment Weekly, Harington said:

I'd like to say sorry for lying to everyone. I'm glad that people were upset that he died. I think my biggest fear was that people were not going to care ... But it seems like people had a similar to the Red Wedding episode, kind of grief about it. Which means something I'm doing—or the show is doing—is right.

Joanna Robinson of Vanity Fair credited Jon's much-discussed cliffhanger death as a primary factor behind Game of Thrones' subsequent 25% ratings increase for season 6. Harington's performance in season 6 earned the actor his first Primetime Emmy Award nomination in July 2016. Harington as Jon had the most screen time of any other character in the first seven seasons of the show.

=== Storylines ===
==== Season 1 ====
Jon Snow, the bastard son of Eddard Stark, Lord of Winterfell and Warden of the North, decides to join the Night's Watch. He arrives at Castle Black with his direwolf Ghost to find that the once proud order is a shadow of its former self. Raised to be a skilled fighter with a strong sense of justice and honor, Jon is initially contemptuous of his fellow recruits, most of whom are lowborn criminals and exiles. He is persuaded by Tyrion Lannister to put aside his prejudices and help train the others. Jon befriends Samwell Tarly, an overweight, fearful recruit who is more an intellectual than a fighter. Jon takes his vows but is disappointed about being made steward to Lord Commander Jeor Mormont rather than a ranger. Sam points out that Jon is likely being groomed for future command. Jon saves Mormont from a wight and is given the House Mormont ancestral sword Longclaw, made of Valyrian steel, with a wolf's head pommel custom-made for Jon. Jon learns of his father's execution for apparent treason and, although tempted to leave the Wall to join Robb Stark's army, is convinced to stay.

==== Season 2 ====
Jon accompanies the Night's Watch on the Great Ranging beyond the Wall. When the Night's Watch seek shelter from the wildling Craster, an older man who marries his own daughters, Jon is horrified to discover that Craster sacrifices his sons to the White Walkers. Later, as part of a small scouting party led by legendary Night's Watch ranger Qhorin Halfhand, Jon is tasked with killing a wildling prisoner, a woman warrior Ygritte. He finds himself unable to do so, and she escapes, only to be captured by her comrades. Qhorin, also taken prisoner, orders Jon to pretend to defect and join the wildlings in order to discover their plans. Qhorin stages a fight and secretly instructs Jon to kill him to gain the wildlings' trust. Jon does and is taken to meet former Night's Watch ranger Mance Rayder, the wildlings' King-Beyond-the Wall.

==== Season 3 ====
Jon pledges his loyalty to Mance and travels with the wildlings, learning that they intend to scale the Wall and force their way south to escape the inevitable arrival of the White Walker army. Jon attempts to convince Mance not to attack the Wall, falsely claiming Castle Black is home to over 1,000 Watchmen. Ygritte seduces Jon and takes his virginity, and they eventually fall in love. After scaling the Wall, Jon refuses to kill an innocent man to prove his loyalty. He is attacked by the other wildlings but escapes to Castle Black, despite being wounded by a devastated Ygritte.

==== Season 4 ====
Jon survives his wounds and is tried for his defection to the wildlings, but Maester Aemon is convinced of Jon's loyalty to the Watch and frees him. Jon leads an expedition to Craster's Keep, where some Night's Watchmen have mutinied and murdered Lord Commander Mormont. After defeating the mutineers, Jon is reunited with Ghost. Later, Tormund Giantsbane's wildlings attack Castle Black while Mance's army besieges the Wall. Acting commander Ser Alliser Thorne is wounded, forcing Jon to take command of the battle. Jon fights and kills Styr, leader of the Thenns. The wildlings are successfully repelled, although Ygritte is shot with an arrow and dies in Jon's arms. Jon goes beyond the Wall to negotiate with Mance, but Stannis Baratheon's army arrives and routs the wildling camp, taking Mance prisoner. At Tormund's behest, Jon cremates Ygritte beyond the Wall.

==== Season 5 ====
Stannis enlists Jon as an intermediary between himself and Mance, hoping to add the wildling army to his own. Mance refuses to kneel to Stannis, and he is subsequently burned at the stake by the red priestess Melisandre. Jon shoots Mance with an arrow before he succumbs to the fire. Stannis, who intends to take Winterfell from the traitorous House Bolton, offers to legitimize Jon as a Stark and name him Lord of Winterfell in exchange for his support, but Jon remains loyal to his vows.

As the Watch prepares to elect a new Lord Commander, Sam advocates for Jon, who is unexpectedly elected as the new Lord Commander of the Night's Watch, initially tying with his nemesis Thorne before Maester Aemon's vote breaks the tie. Jon's intention to bring the wildlings into the Seven Kingdoms and grant them lands south of the Wall further enrages Thorne's faction of the Watch, who all hold a hatred for the wildlings. Jon travels to the wildling village of Hardhome, seeking their support for his plan to ally the Night's Watch and the wildlings against the growing threat of the White Walkers. Several thousand agree to come with Jon, but the rest are massacred when the White Walkers attack the village. However, Jon discovers their vulnerability to Valyrian steel when he destroys one with Longclaw. Jon returns to the Wall, where he learns that Stannis has been defeated by the Boltons. Later, he is lured into a trap by his steward Olly and is killed by Thorne and his men. They assassinate Jon for his perceived betrayal of the Night's Watch.

==== Season 6 ====
Davos Seaworth finds Jon's body. He, Dolorous Edd, and other brothers of the Watch loyal to Jon barricade themselves in a room with Ghost, and an attack by Thorne and his men is thwarted by the arrival of Tormund and his wildlings. Davos encourages Melisandre to attempt to resurrect Jon. The ritual seems to fail, but Jon suddenly awakens. After hanging Thorne and the other ringleaders of his assassination, Jon declares that he has been released from his Night's Watch vows by death, and passes command to Edd. He makes plans to leave Castle Black. Jon is reunited with his half-sister Sansa Stark, who has fled her abusive husband Ramsay Bolton and seeks Jon's aid in retaking Winterfell. Jon refuses until a threatening message arrives from Ramsay demanding Sansa's return and announcing Ramsay's possession of their brother Rickon. Jon, Sansa, Davos, and Tormund travel the North to recruit an army to take back Winterfell and rescue Rickon, but many houses refuse to support them. Jon convinces the wildlings to fight with him. As the armies assemble, Ramsay kills Rickon in order to provoke Jon and lure the Stark forces out of position. The ploy works, and the outnumbered Stark forces are surrounded and nearly slaughtered, but the Knights of the Vale of House Arryn arrive with Sansa and Petyr Baelish and rout the Bolton army. Jon pursues Ramsay back into Winterfell and subdues him, but allows Sansa to decide his death. Jon gathers the lords of the North and warns them of the threat of the White Walkers. The Northern lords declare Jon the new King in the North.

Meanwhile, Bran Stark has a vision of the past which shows Ned reuniting with his dying sister Lyanna Stark in the Tower of Joy. She makes him swear to protect her son with Rhaegar Targaryen, who is revealed to be Jon.

==== Season 7 ====
Jon prepares the North's defense against the White Walkers. He receives a message from Cersei Lannister that he must swear his allegiance to her, as well as an invitation to Dragonstone from Daenerys Targaryen's Hand Tyrion. In a message from Sam, Jon learns Dragonstone has a deposit of dragonglass, to which the White Walkers and wights are vulnerable. He decides to meet with Daenerys. Daenerys wants Jon to bend the knee, but Jon refuses, insisting that the White Walkers are a threat to all of humanity. Tyrion persuades Daenerys to let Jon mine dragonglass as a gesture of goodwill. Jon discovers cave drawings of the First Men and the Children of the Forest fighting the White Walkers and invites Daenerys to view them. As part of the plan to convince Cersei that the army of the dead is real, Jon leads an expedition beyond the Wall to capture a wight to provide proof of it. During the mission, when Jon kills a White Walker, the wights it had reanimated are destroyed. He realizes that killing the Night King will likely kill the entire army of the dead. When wights surround Jon and his party, Daenerys comes to their aid with her dragons. However, one of the dragons, Viserion, is killed by the Night King. Daenerys is forced to flee without Jon, but Benjen Stark arrives to rescue him, sacrificing himself. Later, Daenerys vows to fight the Night King with Jon, and he swears fealty to her as his queen.

Jon and Daenerys travel to King's Landing to parley with Cersei. Cersei is apparently convinced to declare a truce so that the Lannisters may aid in the battle against the dead but later reveals to Jaime Lannister that she has no intention of keeping her word. Meanwhile, Sam and Bran have discovered that Jon was born Aegon Targaryen, the legitimate son of Rhaegar and Lyanna and rightful heir to House Targaryen. Having fallen in love, Jon and Daenerys give in to their feelings for each other and have sex on their voyage north while unaware they are related by blood.

==== Season 8 ====
Jon returns to Winterfell and is reunited with Bran and Arya Stark. He learns the White Walkers have breached the Wall. Though they have readied Winterfell for battle, Sansa and the Northern lords are angry over Jon bending the knee to Daenerys. Jon's bond with Daenerys continues to grow, and he rides one of her dragons, Rhaegal. Sam tells Jon the truth about his identity as Aegon Targaryen. Later, Jon reveals this to Daenerys. The White Walkers arrive, and Jon attempts to engage the Night King in single combat but is stopped when the Night King reanimates the dead to fight Jon. Jon attempts to pursue him to the Godswood, where Bran is waiting to lure the Night King, but is cornered by the undead Viserion. Jon prepares to fight Viserion, but the Night King is killed by Arya, destroying the army of the dead. In the celebrations afterwards, Jon is praised by the wildlings. This troubles Daenerys, who fears the people of Westeros would prefer Jon as their ruler over her. Jon is troubled by his blood relation to Daenerys, causing him to withdraw from their intimacy.

Jon assures Daenerys that he has no desire to take the Iron Throne, renouncing his claim for hers, but insists he must be honest with his sisters about his true parentage. Jon tells Sansa and Arya, swearing them to secrecy, but Sansa sees him as a preferable alternative to Daenerys and tells Tyrion. Tyrion informs Varys, who implores Jon to take the Iron Throne, but Jon refuses to betray Daenerys.

Jon leads the Northern forces to help Daenerys claim the Iron Throne. They take King's Landing, and the city surrenders to Daenerys. However, having been driven mad by her recent losses and betrayals, Daenerys burns the city, killing hundreds of thousands of innocent civilians. Afterward, she declares she will wage war on the rest of the world until she rules the entire planet. Arya and Tyrion warn Jon that Daenerys will view his heritage as a threat and that she is a threat to the Starks. Tyrion tells Jon that despite Jon's love for Daenerys, it is his duty to kill her to protect the people. Jon confronts Daenerys but, unable to dissuade her from further destruction, reluctantly kills her, and she dies in his arms. Jon is imprisoned by Grey Worm and awaits execution. Tyrion convinces the lords of Westeros to set up a new system of kingship, with Bran elected the King of the Six Kingdoms (the North having been granted independence). Bran sentences Jon to the Night's Watch to appease Daenerys' supporters as a compromise. Jon returns to Castle Black and leads the wildlings to return to their lands beyond the Wall.

=== Recognition and awards ===
Harington has received several accolades for the role of Jon Snow, including a Golden Globe nomination for Best Actor – Television Series Drama in 2019, and two Primetime Emmy Awards nominations for Outstanding Supporting Actor in a Drama Series in 2016 and Outstanding Lead Actor in a Drama Series in 2019. He has also been nominated for two Critics' Choice Awards for Best Supporting Actor in a Drama Series in 2016 and Best Actor in a Drama Series in 2019. Harington was also nominated for four Saturn Award for Best Supporting Actor on Television and a Saturn Award for Best Actor on Television. His other nominations include the Golden Nymph Award for Outstanding Actor in a Drama Series in 2012. He won the Young Hollywood Award for Actor of the Year in 2013, and was nominated for the Critics' Choice Television Award for Best Supporting Actor in a Drama Series in 2016. IGN also nominated Jon Snow as its Best TV Hero in 2011.
