= The Climb (Game of Thrones) =

- Game of Thrones episode
- Episode no.: Season 3 Episode 6
- Directed by: Alik Sakharov
- Written by: David Benioff; D. B. Weiss
- Cinematography by: David Katznelson
- Editing by: Oral Norrie Ottey
- Original air date: May 5, 2013
- Running time: 53 minutes

Guest appearances
- Diana Rigg as Olenna Tyrell; Gwendoline Christie as Brienne of Tarth; Michael McElhatton as Roose Bolton; Paul Kaye as Thoros of Myr; Richard Dormer as Beric Dondarrion; Mackenzie Crook as Orell; Natalia Tena as Osha; Clive Russell as Brynden "Blackfish" Tully; Tobias Menzies as Edmure Tully; Kristofer Hivju as Tormund Giantsbane; Iwan Rheon as Boy; Hannah Murray as Gilly; Finn Jones as Loras Tyrell; Thomas Brodie Sangster as Jojen Reed; Ellie Kendrick as Meera Reed; Esmé Bianco as Ros; Philip McGinley as Anguy; Kristian Nairn as Hodor; Tom Brooke as Lothar Frey; Tim Plester as Black Walder Rivers; Sara Dylan as Handmaid; Art Parkinson as Rickon Stark

Episode chronology
← Previous "Kissed by Fire"	Next → "The Bear and the Maiden Fair"
- Game of Thrones season 3

"The Climb" is the sixth episode of the third season of the HBO medieval fantasy television series Game of Thrones. The 26th episode of the series overall, it was written by series co-creators David Benioff and D. B. Weiss, and directed by Alik Sakharov. It first aired on HBO on May 5, 2013.

The episode's title comes from climbing of the wall by Jon Snow and Ygritte, and also the references from dialogue between Lord Petyr Baelish and Lord Varys.

The episode marks the final appearance of Esmé Bianco (Ros). It received positive reviews, with critics mainly praising the performances of Charles Dance and Diana Rigg.

== Plot ==
=== In King's Landing ===
Meeting with Olenna, Tywin threatens to appoint Loras to the Kingsguard, thereby renouncing his right to inheritance and marriage and leaving House Tyrell without a male heir, and reluctantly she consents to Loras and Cersei's marriage.

Tyrion accuses Cersei of trying to have him killed during the Battle of the Blackwater, but deduces it was Joffrey who ordered his death. Cersei tells him he is not in danger now that Tywin is the Hand. In private, Tyrion informs Sansa of his father's plans for them, with Shae present.

Baelish tells Varys he has given Ros to a friend (revealed to be Joffrey) to kill for his pleasure. Sansa watches tearfully as Baelish departs by ship, losing her chance at leaving the capital.

=== In the Riverlands ===
Arriving at the Brotherhood's hideout, Melisandre is shocked to learn of Beric's six resurrections, and buys Gendry for her blood magic spell involving king's blood. Arya declares Melisandre is a witch but Melisandre says that there is a darkness inside Arya, seeing eyes she will “shut forever” and declares they will meet again.

At Riverrun, Robb and his advisors discuss an alliance with Lame Lothar Frey and Black Walder Rivers. Lord Walder Frey's demands include a formal apology from Robb, the Harrenhal, and for Edmure to marry one of his daughters.

At Harrenhal, Roose Bolton agrees to send Jaime to King's Landing if Jaime assures Tywin that Bolton had nothing to do with his maiming, and keeps Brienne under arrest for abetting treason.

=== In the North ===
Bran defuses tensions between Osha and Meera, and Jojen tells Bran his vision of Jon being on the other side of the wall and surrounded by enemies.

Torturing Theon, the boy threatens to sever his finger if he cannot guess the boy's identity and their location. After his finger is flayed for several wrong guesses, Theon guesses the boy is a Karstark and he is being tortured at Karhold for betraying Robb. The boy pretends Theon was correct before admitting his torture is solely for his amusement.

=== Beyond the Wall ===
En route to the Wall, Sam shows Gilly the dragonglass dagger he found and tells her about Castle Black.

Ygritte reveals she is aware Jon remains loyal to the Night's Watch, but tells him their loyalty to each other is greater. As Tormund's party climbs the wall, Ygritte inadvertently causes an avalanche that kills some wildlings and leaves her and Jon hanging by their rope. Before Orell cuts the rope, Jon secures himself to the Wall and reaches the top with Ygritte, where they embrace.

== Production ==
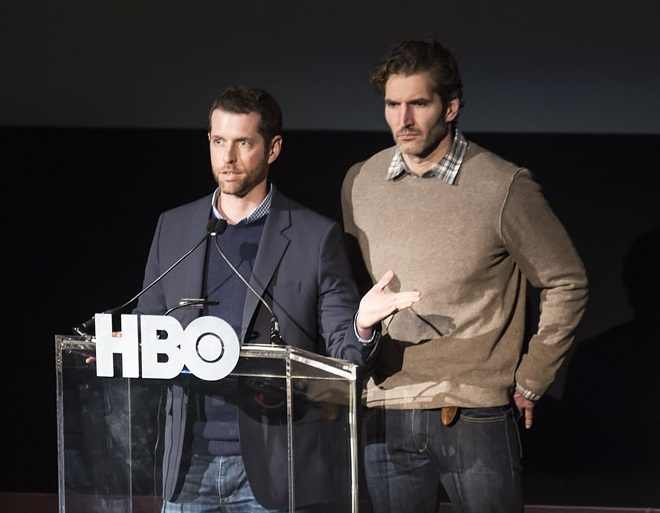
The episode was written by series co-creators David Benioff and D. B. Weiss.

"The Climb" is the sixth episode of the season written by showrunners David Benioff and D. B. Weiss, and 18th overall. It is based upon George R. R. Martin's novel A Storm of Swords, namely, chapters 30, 35, 37, and 48 (Jon IV, Catelyn IV, Jaime V, and Samwell III).

Gilly's baby, appearing in the fourth episode and in "The Climb"'s first scene, was played by ten months-old Arya Hasson – named after Arya Stark – from the Waterside in Derry.

== Reception ==
=== Ratings ===
"The Climb" set a new record for Game of Thrones in ratings, the fourth consecutive episode to establish a new series high. 5.5 million viewers watched the premiere airing, with 1.27 million additional viewers watching the second airing. The episode also set a new series high in viewers aged 18–49, with a rating of 2.9. In the United Kingdom, the episode was seen by 0.926 million viewers on Sky Atlantic, being the channel's highest-rated broadcast that week.

=== Critical reception ===
"The Climb" was met with positive reviews from critics. Review aggregator Rotten Tomatoes surveyed 21 reviews of the episode and judged 90% of them to be positive with an average score of 7.9 out of 10. The website's critical consensus reads "Tywin Lannister and Olenna Tyrell steal the show with their exquisite negotiation as 'The Climb' builds towards the Wildlings' death-defying scaling of The Wall." Writing for IGN, Matt Fowler gave the episode an 8.8/10, writing "This week's Game of Thrones started off slow, but then built to a roaring crescendo." Two reviews were published by The A.V. Club. David Sims gave the episode a "B" rating for people new to the series, while Emily VanDerWerff rated the episode a "B+" for people who have read the novels.

=== Awards and nominations ===
Year	Award	Category	Nominee(s)	Result
2013	Hollywood Post Alliance Awards	Outstanding Sound – Television	Paula Fairfield, Brad Katona, Jed Dodge, Onnalee Blank and Mathew Waters	Won
2014	Visual Effects Society	Outstanding Compositing in a Broadcast Program	Kirk Brillon, Steve Gordon, Geoff Sayer, Winston Lee	Won
2014	Visual Effects Society	Outstanding Created Environment in a Broadcast Program	Patrick Zentis, Mayur Patel, Nitin Singh, Tim Alexander	Won
