= The Bear and the Maiden Fair =

- Game of Thrones episode
- Episode no.: Season 3 Episode 7
- Directed by: Michelle MacLaren
- Written by: George R. R. Martin
- Cinematography by: Chris Seager
- Editing by: Frances Parker
- Original air date: May 12, 2013
- Running time: 57 minutes

Guest appearances
- Mackenzie Crook as Orell; Gwendoline Christie as Brienne of Tarth; Richard Dormer as Beric Dondarrion; Paul Kaye as Thoros of Myr; Noah Taylor as Locke; Natalia Tena as Osha; Anton Lesser as Qyburn; Michael McElhatton as Roose Bolton; Clive Russell as Brynden "Blackfish" Tully; Tobias Menzies as Edmure Tully; Ian McElhinney as Ser Barristan Selmy; Iwan Rheon as Boy; Kristofer Hivju as Tormund Giantsbane; Thomas Brodie Sangster as Jojen Reed; Ellie Kendrick as Meera Reed; Nathalie Emmanuel as Missandei; Jacob Anderson as Grey Worm; Kristian Nairn as Hodor; Philip McGinley as Anguy; George Georgiou as Razdal mo Eraz; Jamie Michie as Steelshanks; Charlotte Hope as Myranda; Stephanie Blacker as Violet; Art Parkinson as Rickon Stark

Episode chronology
← Previous "The Climb"	Next → "Second Sons"
- Game of Thrones season 3

"The Bear and the Maiden Fair" is the seventh episode of the third season of HBO's fantasy television series Game of Thrones, and the 27th episode of the series overall. The episode was written by George R. R. Martin, the author of the A Song of Ice and Fire novels on which the series is based, and was directed by Michelle MacLaren, her directorial debut for the series.

The plot of the episode advances the storylines of Daenerys's arrival to the city of Yunkai, the repercussions of the upcoming marriage of Tyrion Lannister and Sansa Stark, and Brienne's fate at the ruined castle of Harrenhal. The title of the episode refers to "The Bear and the Maiden Fair," a popular song among commoners and noblemen within the series' universe, which had been introduced four episodes earlier. In this episode, it refers to Brienne of Tarth (the maiden fair) facing a real bear.

The episode received mostly positive reviews, with critics praising the writing and characterization, but considered it not among the best of the episodes written by George R. R. Martin.

== Plot ==
=== In the Riverlands ===
Robb, his advisors, and his army are delayed by rain in their march toward the Twins for Edmure's wedding to Roslin Frey. Catelyn and the Blackfish discuss their distaste for Walder Frey, who will see their delay and Robb's oath-breaking as slights against his family. Talisa reveals to Robb that she is pregnant.

At the Brotherhood's hideout, Arya berates Beric and Thoros for taking money for Gendry. When Anguy tells Beric of a Lannister raiding party near them, he orders the men to move out in pursuit. Arya calls Beric a liar, and runs away but is quickly captured by the Hound.

At Harrenhal, Jaime visits Brienne in her cell and before he leaves, she makes him swear to uphold his oath to Catelyn and return the Stark girls to their mother. Later, Qyburn informs Jaime that Brienne will not be ransomed by Locke. He blackmails the party leader, Steelshanks, to order their return to Harrenhal. There, Jaime finds that Brienne has been forced to fight a grizzly bear while armed only with a wooden sword. Jaime leaps into the pit to protect her and manages to free Brienne from Locke and leaves.

=== Outside Yunkai ===
Daenerys and her army reach Yunkai. Daenerys tells Jorah she will take the city to free its 200,000 slaves. An envoy, Razdal mo Eraz, is sent to offer terms, which include gold and as many ships as she wants. Daenerys refuses his offer, demanding the slaves of the city be freed and compensated for their service or she will attack.

=== In King's Landing ===
Sansa is comforted by Margaery, who has heard of her betrothal to Tyrion. Elsewhere, Tyrion and Bronn discuss the match and how it will affect Shae. Tywin meets with Joffrey who asks what they should do about the rumors of Daenerys and her dragons, but Tywin claims there is no threat.

On Blackwater Bay, Melisandre reveals to Gendry that his father was King Robert Baratheon.

=== In the North ===
Jon and the wildling party continue their journey south. Soon after, Orell speaks to Ygritte, confessing his love for her and trying to convince her that Jon is still loyal to the Night's Watch. Later, Jon tells Ygritte that the wildling cause is hopeless, but she remains undaunted.

Theon is freed from his constraints by two young women who begin pleasuring him. They are soon interrupted by his tormenter, who mocks Theon's sexual prowess, before ordering his men to restrain Theon as he removes his genitals.

Heading north, Osha continues to grow suspicious of the Reeds, calling Jojen's visions "black magic". When she says they have to continue, Jojen reveals that the three-eyed raven is north of the Wall. Osha refuses to allow them to go north of the Wall, relating to them the story of her husband's disappearance, his return as a wight and her having to burn their home down with him inside.

== Production ==
=== Writing ===
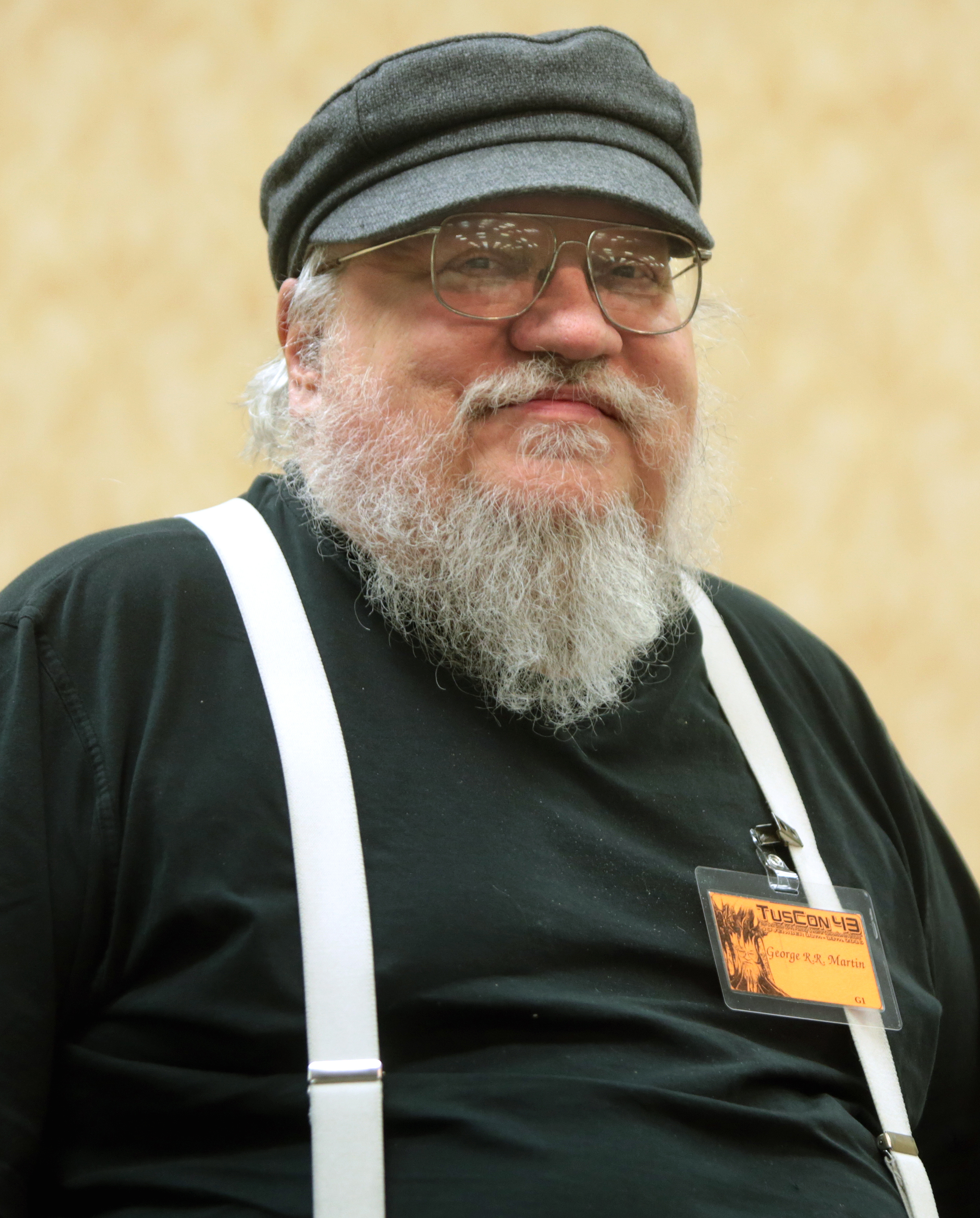
George R. R. Martin, author of the A Song of Ice and Fire novels, scripts one episode per season.

The episode was written by George R. R. Martin, author of the novels of the A Song of Ice and Fire saga that the show adapts. "The Bear and the Maiden Fair" is based on material from the third book of his series, A Storm of Swords, adapting chapters 42 to 46 (Jon V, Daenerys IV, Arya VIII, Jaime VI and Catelyn V).

In writing the episode, Martin had to take account of changes made by the production to his books’ original plots and characters, writing scenes that could not have taken place in the novels. The books have Talisa's counterpart stay in Riverrun instead of following Robb, and Melisandre never interacts with Gendry. Sansa does not confide in Margaery, whose characterisation in the novels would render the scene implausible.

Martin initially titled the episode "Autumn Storms," because it was supposed to be raining in many of the scenes. When he was forced to change it because most of the rains had been cut from his script in pre-production, he came up with the title "Chains," that worked both in a literal and metaphorical level. However, later on, the final scene including the bear that had been originally written by showrunners Benioff and Weiss for the next episode was incorporated, and the episode was given its final title.

=== Casting ===
To play the part of the bear at Harrenhal, the producers chose the nearly nine-foot-tall Alaskan brown bear Bart the Bear 2 (a.k.a. "Little Bart"), who was born in 2000 and trained by Doug and Lynne Seus (the same trainers of his well-known predecessor, the original Bart the Bear).

=== Filming locations ===
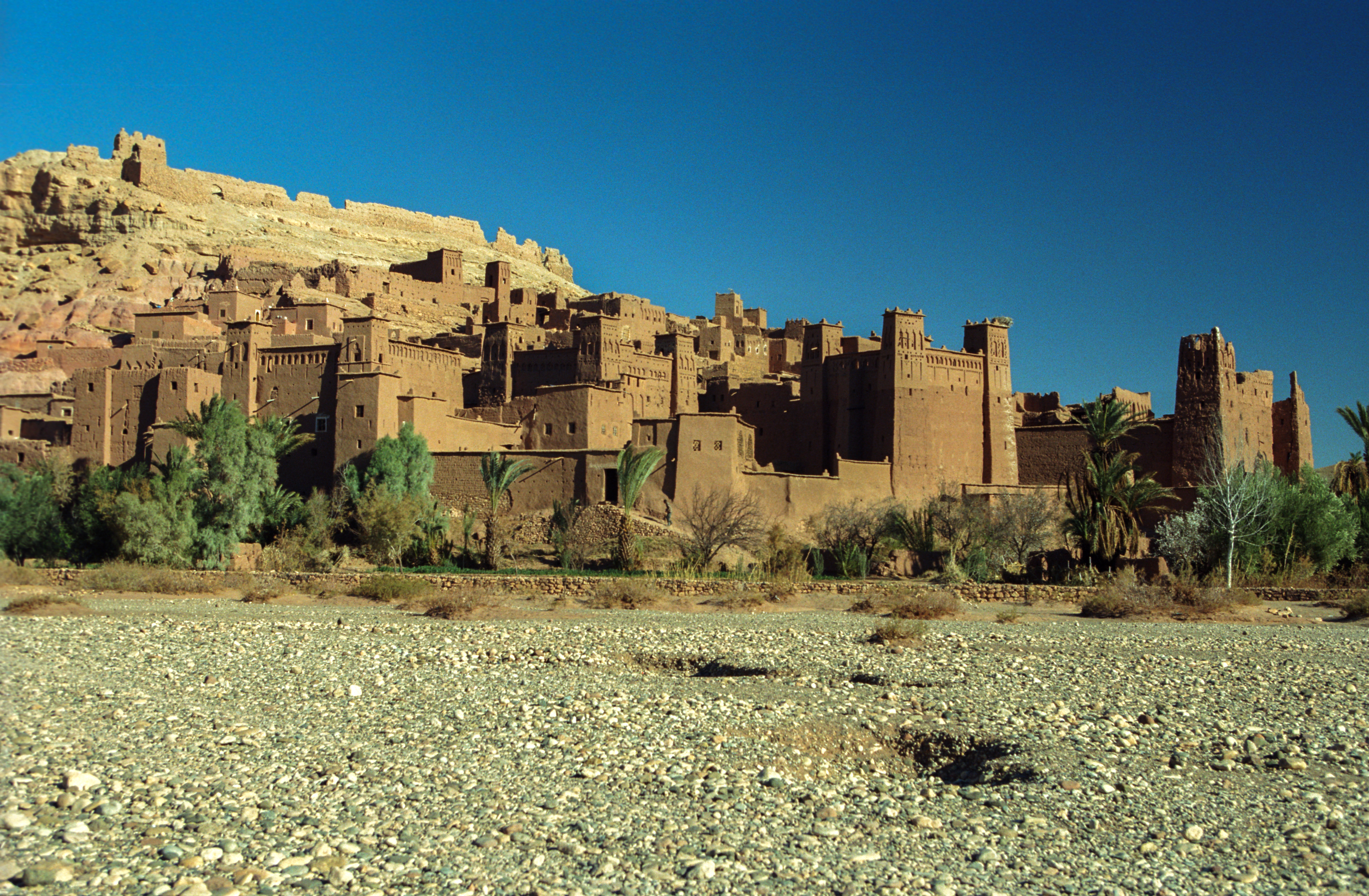
The episode introduces Yunkai, based on the Moroccan city of Aït Benhaddou.

The production continued to use Morocco to depict the Slaver's Bay. While the coastal city of Essaouira had doubled as Astapor, this episode used the city of Aït Benhaddou (near Ouarzazate) to depict Yunkai. Daenerys's camp was built in the nearby location of Little Barrage.

The scenes with Jon Snow and the wildlings were filmed in the forests around Toome, in County Antrim, Northern Ireland. The scenes in Northern Ireland were filmed six weeks before the production moved to Iceland to film several scenes for the previous episodes.

Due to the legal restrictions and the difficulties involved in the transport of large animals, the scenes with the bear Little Bart had to be filmed in the USA. Although it was only used for a single scene, this was the fifth country where the production filmed during the season (after Northern Ireland, Morocco, Croatia, and Iceland). The actual bear-pit set was built in Northern Ireland: the bear was filmed where it was living in Los Angeles, interacting with its trainer, and was later digitally added into the footage from the bear pit set in Northern Ireland.

== Reception ==
=== Ratings ===
4.84 million viewers watched the premiere airing of "The Bear and the Maiden Fair", a decrease of 0.67 million compared to the previous week. This ended the streak set during the four previous episodes, each of which established a new series high in ratings. 1.12 million people watched the second airing, bringing the total viewership of the night to 5.96 million. In the United Kingdom, the episode was seen by 1.023 million viewers on Sky Atlantic, being the channel's highest-rated broadcast that week.

=== Critical reception ===
The critical reception to the episode was generally favorable, although most commentators agreed that it was not among the best episodes of the third season, or the ones written by Martin. Review aggregator Rotten Tomatoes surveyed 21 reviews of the episode and judged 81% of them to be positive with an average score of 8.05 out of 10. The website's critical consensus reads, "'The Bear and the Maiden Fair" feels like a bit of a holding pattern as Game of Thrones moves its pieces into place for the final three episodes." The quality of the dialogue and characterization was widely praised. The A.V. Club's David Sims found that the interactions felt more natural, and Elio Garcia from Westeros.org suggested that the characters "oozed a richer version of themselves".

"'The Bear and the Maiden Fair' is much more of a piece-mover episode, getting characters from Point A to Point B either on the map (the wildlings marching towards Castle Black, Melisandre and Gendry sailing back towards Dragonstone) or on their emotional journey (Sansa and Tyrion both struggling to make peace with their impending nuptials). It's one of the more thorough of its kind, touching on nearly every plot this season has set in motion. And because it's directed by Michelle MacLaren (...) and written by George R.R. Martin himself, it's about as good (and good-looking) a piece-mover episode as you're going to see."

— Alan Sepinwall, HitFix

Many reviews signaled the lack of focus as the main flaw of the episode, although they agreed that the story required preparing the stage for the final part of the season: Emily VanDerWerff wrote at The A.V. Club that it was a "somewhat disjointed hour, full of characters moving into place for what’s next (...) it nonetheless accomplishes what it sets out to do". According to Myles McNutt from Cultural Learnings, the episode "never evolves into a particularly exciting hour of television, content mostly to sketch out the boundaries of the season’s storylines in preparation for the oncoming climax."

The final scene, where Brienne is forced to fight a bear, was very well received: IGN's Matt Fowler called it "a spectacular moment", HitFix's Alan Sepinwall deemed it "gorgeously staged and executed", and David Sims found it "tense, thrilling television". Other scenes that were highlighted were the parley between Daenerys and the slaver, and the confrontation between Tywin and Joffrey. In the latter, the camera work used by director Michelle MacLaren was lauded.

In contrast, the scene featuring Theon's torture was criticized for what was seen as its gratuitous violence and nudity, and for the repetitiveness of the storyline over the season. Sepinwall declared that he had no need "to witness more of The Passion of the Greyjoy", and Sims considered it "boring and confusing to watch". VanDerWerff concluded: "Endless torture sequences don’t make for terribly exciting fiction, and that’s more or less bearing out here." On the other end of the spectrum, the reviewer for Time, James Poniewozik, considered it "chilling".
