= Kissed by Fire =

- Game of Thrones episode
- Episode no.: Season 3 Episode 5
- Directed by: Alex Graves
- Written by: Bryan Cogman
- Cinematography by: Anette Haellmigk
- Editing by: Katie Weiland
- Original air date: April 28, 2013
- Running time: 57 minutes

Guest appearances
- Diana Rigg as Olenna Tyrell; Gwendoline Christie as Brienne of Tarth; Ian McElhinney as Ser Barristan Selmy; Michael McElhatton as Roose Bolton; Paul Kaye as Thoros of Myr; Richard Dormer as Beric Dondarrion; Mackenzie Crook as Orell; Anton Lesser as Qyburn; Clive Russell as Brynden Tully; Tobias Menzies as Edmure Tully; Kristofer Hivju as Tormund Giantsbane; Noah Taylor as Locke; Finn Jones as Loras Tyrell; John Stahl as Rickard Karstark; Tara Fitzgerald as Selyse Baratheon; Kerry Ingram as Shireen Baratheon; Nathalie Emmanuel as Missandei; Jacob Anderson as Grey Worm; Philip McGinley as Anguy; Daniel Portman as Podrick Payne; Will Tudor as Olyver; Dean-Charles Chapman as Martyn Lannister; Timothy Gibbons as Willem Lannister

Episode chronology
← Previous "And Now His Watch Is Ended"	Next → "The Climb"
- Game of Thrones season 3

"Kissed by Fire" is the fifth episode of the third season of HBO's fantasy television series Game of Thrones, and the 25th episode of the whole series. Directed by Alex Graves and written by Bryan Cogman, it aired on April 28, 2013.

The title of the episode refers to the red-haired Wildlings, like Ygritte, who are said to be "kissed by fire". Fire is also a key element in other storylines, with Sandor Clegane's fear of fire being shown, as well as the Mad King's obsession with Wildfire, as told by Jaime Lannister. This episode also introduces another character named Shireen Baratheon, with the title foreshadowing her fate in "The Dance of Dragons."

The episode received positive reviews from critics, with many singling out the scene with Jaime and Brienne in the bath as the episode's highlight—praising Nikolaj Coster-Waldau's performance. It won the Primetime Emmy Award for Outstanding Make-up for a Single-Camera Series (Non-Prosthetic) at the 65th Primetime Creative Arts Emmy Awards.

== Plot ==
=== At Dragonstone ===
Stannis is surprised when his wife, Queen Selyse, encourages his infidelity as service to the Lord of Light. His daughter, Princess Shireen, visits Davos in the dungeons with a book. At this time, he admits he is illiterate and Stannis’s daughter begins teaching him to read.

=== In the Riverlands ===
In trial by combat, the Hound is offput by Beric's flaming sword, but overcomes his pyrophobia and kills Beric. Gendry stops Arya from attacking the Hound, and Beric is resurrected for a sixth time by Thoros, who then frees the Hound. Later, Gendry tells Arya he intends to stay with the Brotherhood as a smith. Arya talks with Thoros about taking her to Riverrun to claim a reward from Robb Stark.

=== At Riverrun ===
Captives Martyn and Willem Lannister are murdered by Lord Karstark and his men. Despite Talisa, Catelyn, and Edmure entreating Robb to hold Karstark prisoner, he personally executes Karstark. Soon, the Karstark forces abandon the Northern army, and Robb tells Talisa his new plan to attack Casterly Rock, the Lannister ancestral home, and forge an alliance for troops with Lord Frey, whose daughter he was to marry.

=== At Harrenhal ===
Locke delivers Jaime and Brienne to Lord Roose Bolton, who frees Brienne and sends Jaime to Qyburn, a former maester thrown out of the Citadel for human experimentation, who treats Jaime's amputation. At the baths, Jaime tells Brienne of Robert's Rebellion, and the "Mad King" Aerys Targaryen's plot to burn King's Landing with caches of wildfire. Jaime reveals that he killed the Mad King and broke his oath to save the city, its people, and his own father after the King ordered him to bring him his father's head. Shocked, Brienne asks why he didn’t tell Eddard Stark the truth but Jaime believes he didn’t have to explain himself.

=== Beyond the Wall ===
Jon reveals which forts are manned but lies to Orell and Tormund that a thousand men are stationed at Castle Black. Ygritte steals Jon's sword and he chases her into a cave, where she has him break his Night's Watch vows and make love to her.

=== In Slaver's Bay ===
Daenerys’s Unsullied officers select Grey Worm as their leader. On the march, Jorah probes Barristan's motives for joining Daenerys, but he appears unaware Jorah was originally a spy for Varys under King Robert.

=== In King's Landing ===
Cersei asks for Baelish's assistance in ridding King's Landing of the Tyrells. Loras’ squire and new lover Olyvar reports to Baelish the Tyrells' plan to marry Sansa. Baelish meets with Sansa to discuss their journey to the Vale, but she decides to stay in King's Landing, which Baelish allows. Later, Tywin tells Tyrion and Cersei his plan to ruin the Tyrell's plot by wedding Tyrion to Sansa and Cersei to Loras, tersely overruling their objections.

== Production ==
=== Writing ===
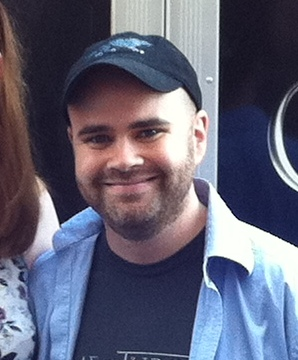
Series veteran Bryan Cogman wrote the episode, his third episode of the series.

"Kissed by Fire" is the third episode in the series written by the co-producer and executive story editor Bryan Cogman, after the first season's "Cripples, Bastards, and Broken Things" and the second's "What Is Dead May Never Die." Cogman is the member of the writing team entrusted with keeping the show's bible and mapping the story arcs with those of the original books for each season.

The sections of George R. R. Martin's novel A Storm of Swords adapted in the episode include parts from chapters 20, 21, 27, 32, 35, 38 and 40 (Tyrion III, Catelyn III, Jon III, Jaime IV, Arya VI, Jaime V, and Arya VII).

The scenes with Stannis' wife and daughter were written to present the characters, whose introduction had been delayed in the show since the beginning of season 2. The idea of Queen Selyse conserving the fetuses of her stillborn sons in glass, absent in the original novels, was a notion that Cogman came up with while writing the episode.

Cogman enjoyed that the episode he was assigned to write included several fan-favorite scenes, and involved a lot of material with the child actors: "The kids are always my favorite characters to write... Maybe it’s because I’m so fond of the actors who play them, and I’ve watched them grow up for the past four years." He wrote all the Arya scenes before starting with the other storylines.

Initially the episode did not include any scene with Daenerys, but early in pre-production some scenes originally written by David Benioff and D. B. Weiss for the next episode were moved into the script. The confrontation between Jon Snow and Orell was written and included by Benioff and Weiss later during production.

=== Casting ===
The episode introduces Stannis's family with actresses Tara Fitzgerald and Kerry Ingram as queen Selyse Baratheon and princess Shireen Baratheon, respectively. Selyse had briefly appeared in the first season 2 episode during the burning of the gods at the Dragonstone beach, played by an uncredited extra. Jacob Anderson also debuts playing Grey Worm, the commander of the Unsullied.

=== Filming locations ===
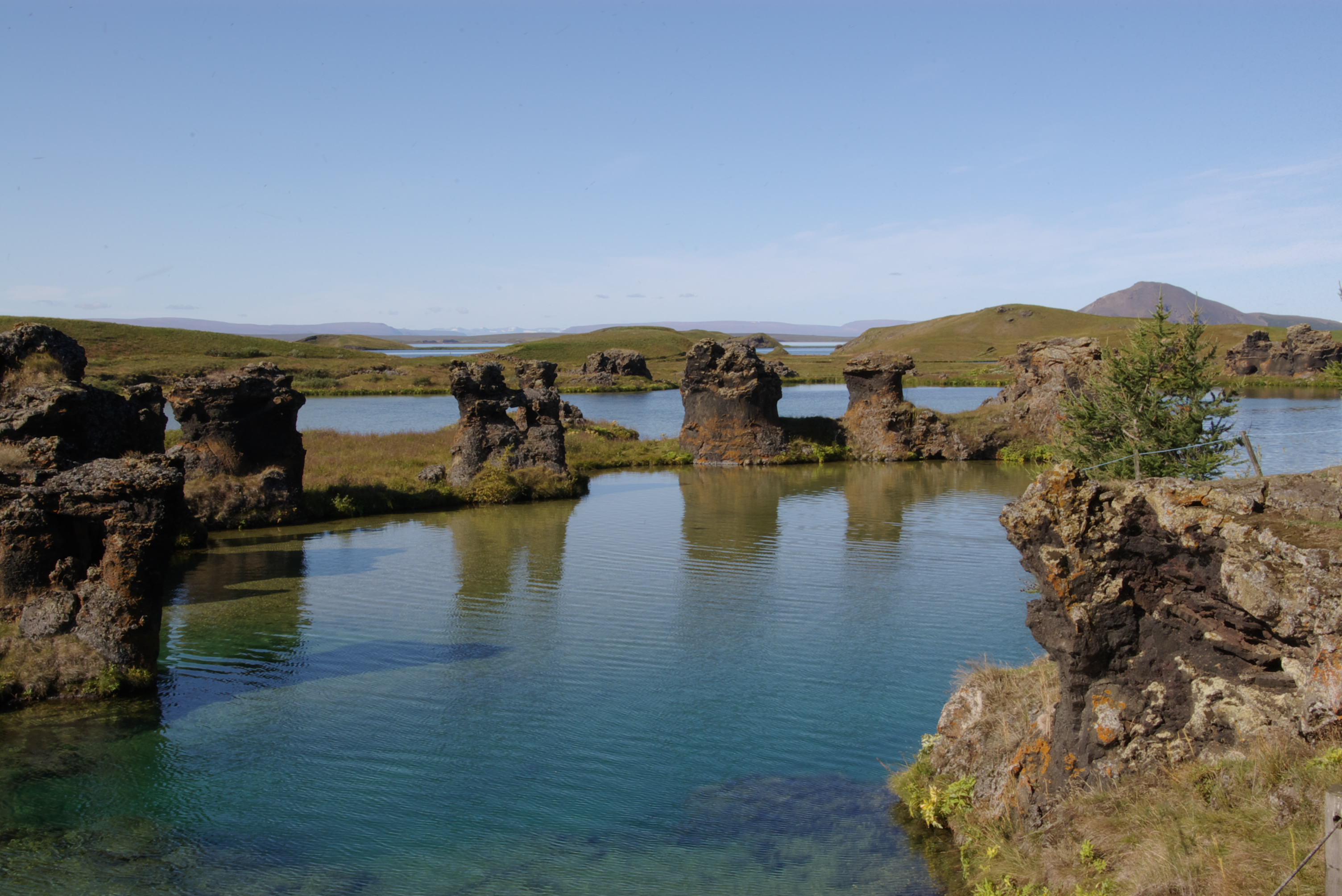
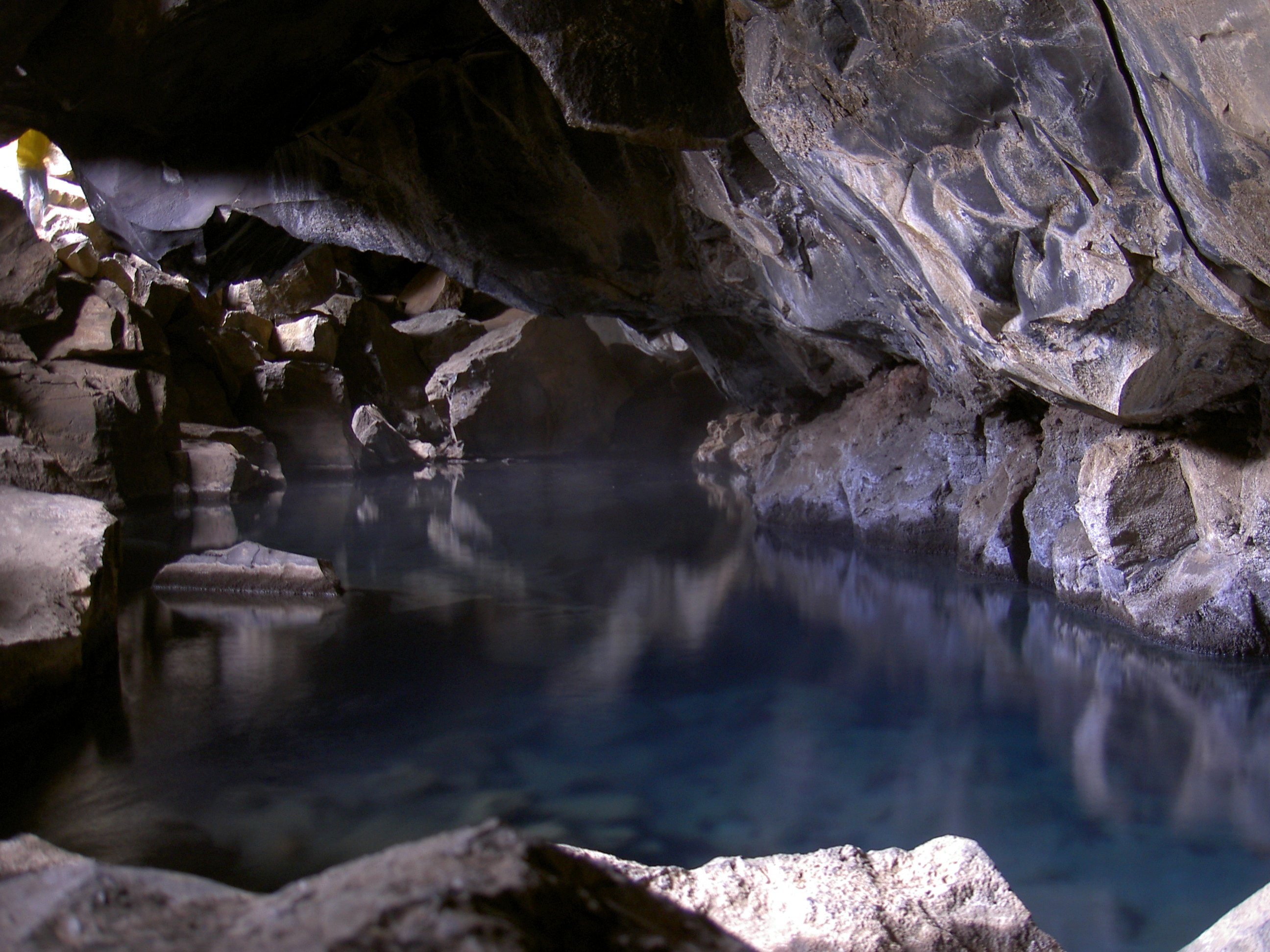
The scenes beyond the Wall were filmed at the shores of lake Mývatn, and at the nearby cave of Grjótagjá.

Most of the episode was shot in the sets built in The Paint Hall studios in Belfast. Also in Northern Ireland, the Pollnagollum cave in Belmore Forest was used to film parts of the hideout of the Brotherhood, and the gardens of Gosford Castle served as the Riverrun exteriors where Lord Karstark was beheaded.

The scenes with Daenerys were filmed in Morocco, and the ones with Jon in Iceland. The Wildlings camp was built by the shores of lake Mývatn, with its distinctive vertical lava formations clearly seen. The nearby grotto where Jon and Ygritte have sex is cave Grjótagjá; however, the cave was used mainly for establishing shots of Jon Snow and Ygritte in the cave, and most of this scene was filmed in the studio. The thermal water pool of the cave is actually used for bathing and is a popular tourist attraction.

Finally, two Croatian exteriors appear in the episode: the conversation between Cersei and Littlefinger takes place at the inner terrace of Fort Lovrijenac, and Littlefinger's later visit to Sansa was filmed at the Trsteno Arboretum.

== Reception ==
=== Ratings ===
"Kissed by Fire" set a new ratings record for the series, with 5.35 million viewers for its first airing and a 2.8 share of adults aged 18 to 49. In the United Kingdom, the episode was seen by 0.959 million viewers on Sky Atlantic, being the channel's second highest-rated broadcast that week.

=== Critical reception ===
"Kissed by Fire" received positive critical reviews after airing, with particular praise going to Nikolaj Coster-Waldau for his performance. Review aggregator Rotten Tomatoes surveyed 21 reviews of the episode and judged 100% of them to be positive with an average score of 8.8 out of 10. The website's critical consensus reads, "Despite lacking the big action reveals of the previous episode, 'Kissed by Fire' is anchored by a devastatingly intimate scene between Brienne and Jaime, and plenty of Lannister intrigue." IGN's Matt Fowler gave "Kissed by Fire" a 9.5/10, his highest rating of the season, writing "No dragons this week, but Game of Thrones still gave us some of its best material ever." Reviewing for The A.V. Club, David Sims gave the episode an "A−", commenting on how despite the lack of shocking moments like those of the last episode, the show delivers quality in its slower, dialogue-driven scenes. Emily VanDerWerff of The A.V. Club gave the episode a "B+". Sean T. Collins of the Rolling Stone magazine also gave an overwhelmingly positive review, calling it a "nearly flawless" episode, praising especially Maisie Williams' acting in the scenes with Arya and the Brotherhood.

=== Accolades ===
Year	Award	Category	Nominee(s)	Result
2013	Primetime Creative Arts Emmy Awards	Outstanding Makeup for a Single-Camera Series (Non-Prosthetic)	Paul Engelen and Melissa Lackersteen	Won
2014	Hollywood Post Alliance Awards	Outstanding Color Grading – Television	Joe Finley	Nominated
2014	American Society of Cinematographers	One-Hour Episodic Television Series	Anette Haellmigk	Nominated
