= Game of Thrones season 3 =

Game of Thrones
- Season 3
- Region 1 DVD artwork
- Showrunners: David Benioff; D. B. Weiss
- Starring: Peter Dinklage; Lena Headey; Emilia Clarke; Kit Harington; Richard Madden; Iain Glen; Michelle Fairley; Aidan Gillen; Charles Dance; Liam Cunningham; Stephen Dillane; Carice van Houten; Natalie Dormer; John Bradley; Jack Gleeson; Sophie Turner; Oona Chaplin; Sibel Kekilli; Rose Leslie; James Cosmo; Jerome Flynn; Nikolaj Coster-Waldau; Isaac Hempstead Wright; Maisie Williams; Alfie Allen; Joe Dempsie; Rory McCann; Conleth Hill
- No. of episodes: 10

Release
- Original network: HBO
- Original release: March 31 – June 9, 2013

Season chronology
- ← Previous; Season 2 Next → Season 4

The third season of the fantasy drama television series Game of Thrones premiered in the United States on HBO on March 31, 2013, and concluded on June 9, 2013. It was broadcast on Sundays at 9:00 pm in the United States, consisting of 10 episodes, each running approximately 50–60 minutes. The season is based roughly on the first half of A Storm of Swords (the third of the A Song of Ice and Fire novels by George R. R. Martin, of which the series is an adaptation). The series is adapted for television by David Benioff and D. B. Weiss. HBO renewed the series for a third season on April 10, 2012, nine days after the second season's premiere. Production began in July 2012. The show was filmed primarily in Ireland, Northern Ireland, Croatia, Iceland, and Morocco.

The story takes place in a fictional world, primarily upon a continent called Westeros, with one storyline occurring on another continent to the east, Essos. Like the novel, the season continues the storyline of The War of the Five Kings: after the death of Renly Baratheon, all three kings in Westeros believe they have a claim to the Iron Throne, besides Robb Stark, who seeks vengeance for the death of his father, Ned Stark, and independence for the North. The season also features other storylines: Daenerys Targaryen begins her rise in power in Essos; Ned's illegitimate son, Jon Snow, goes undercover beyond the Wall; the other Stark children struggle to survive up and down Westeros, but Robb is killed; Jaime Lannister returns to the capital; and all of Westeros is informed of the reawakened threat of the Army of the Dead.

Game of Thrones features a large ensemble cast, including Peter Dinklage, Nikolaj Coster-Waldau, Lena Headey, Emilia Clarke and Kit Harington. The season introduced a number of new cast members, including Diana Rigg, Ciarán Hinds, Nathalie Emmanuel and Iwan Rheon.

Critics praised the show's production values and cast. Viewership yet again rose compared to the previous season. It won two of the 16 Emmy Awards for which it was nominated; nominations included Outstanding Supporting Actor in a Drama Series (Dinklage), Outstanding Supporting Actress in a Drama Series (Clarke), and Outstanding Drama Series. It also won the Critics' Choice Television Award for Best Drama Series.

== Episodes ==
No. overall	No. in season	Title	Directed by	Written by	Original release date	U.S. viewers (millions)
21	1	"Valar Dohaeris"	Daniel Minahan	David Benioff & D. B. Weiss	March 31, 2013	4.37
After the White Walkers attack the Fist of the First Men, the surviving Night's Watchmen, including Samwell Tarly and Jeor Mormont, pledge to return to the Wall and warn the Seven Kingdoms. Jon is brought before Mance Rayder, the "King beyond the Wall", and pledges his loyalty to the wildlings. Robb Stark finds Harrenhal abandoned by the Lannisters, with its inhabitants slaughtered. He orders his bannerman Roose Bolton to garrison the castle and lead the search for Jaime Lannister. A scarred Tyrion Lannister attempts to negotiate Casterly Rock from his father, Tywin, who offers lesser promises and threatens to hang any whores that he catches his son with. Margaery Tyrell engages in charitable acts with King's Landing orphans. Petyr "Littlefinger" Baelish offers to help Sansa Stark escape King's Landing. Ros warns Shae to distrust Littlefinger. Davos Seaworth is rescued by Saan, who wants to break ties with Stannis Baratheon. Davos returns to Dragonstone where he unsuccessfully tries to kill Melisandre and is imprisoned. She blames him for convincing Stannis not to let her join the battle. In Essos, Daenerys Targaryen arrives in Astapor to buy an army of brutally trained mercenary soldiers called the "Unsullied". The Qarthian warlocks attempt to assassinate her, but Ser Barristan Selmy, a former Kingsguard commander, saves her and pledges his loyalty.
22	2	"Dark Wings, Dark Words"	Daniel Minahan	Vanessa Taylor	April 7, 2013	4.27
Brienne of Tarth continues escorting Jaime Lannister across the Riverlands to King's Landing. He engages her in a fight, which is interrupted by Bolton soldiers who capture them. Robb receives news that Winterfell was sacked and that his brothers Bran and Rickon have been killed by Theon Greyjoy. Robb has lost the support of House Frey after breaking his promise to marry one of Lord Walder's granddaughters, while his bannerman Lord Rickard Karstark is furious at the release of Jaime. Arya Stark, Gendry, and Hot Pie also make for Riverrun but are waylaid by the outlawed "Brotherhood Without Banners". They stop at an inn, where the captured Sandor "the Hound" Clegane exposes Arya's identity. Margaery and her grandmother Olenna Tyrell, the "Queen of Thorns", question Sansa about Joffrey Baratheon's troubling personality and suggest that she visit Highgarden. Theon is held in a dungeon and tortured by unknown captors. Bran, Rickon, Osha, and Hodor encounter siblings Jojen and Meera Reed, children of Stark bannerman Howland Reed. Jojen, who has prophetic dreams, tells Bran that he is a warg with the ability to enter animals' minds.
23	3	"Walk of Punishment"	David Benioff	David Benioff & D. B. Weiss	April 14, 2013	4.72
Robb and Catelyn Stark attend Hoster Tully's funeral in Riverrun. Tywin Lannister sends Littlefinger to the Eyrie to marry Lysa Arryn to secure her allegiance, and appoints Tyrion as the Crown's new Master of Coin. Arya and Gendry are taken captive by the Brotherhood, while Hot Pie is allowed to remain behind to work at the inn. Mance Rayder sends Jon and a band of wildlings led by Tormund Giantsbane to scale the Wall and attack Castle Black from its weakly defended back. The surviving Night's Watchmen return to Craster's Keep, where Gilly gives birth to a son. Theon is freed from the dungeon by a mysterious stranger, who tells him that he is being held by one of his jealous uncles. Melisandre leaves Dragonstone, mysteriously stating that the blood of a king is required for victory. Daenerys barters for the 8,000 Unsullied and the translator Missandei in exchange for one of her young dragons, ignoring Barristan's and Jorah Mormont's protestations. Jaime persuades his captor, Locke, to prevent Brienne from being raped by claiming her father will pay a huge ransom; Locke agrees, but he then severs Jaime's right hand without warning.
24	4	"And Now His Watch Is Ended"	Alex Graves	David Benioff & D. B. Weiss	April 21, 2013	4.87
After learning that Theon staged Bran and Rickon's deaths, Theon's "rescuer" betrays him, returning him to the dungeon for further torture. After a failed escape attempt, Jaime believes himself lost without his sword hand; Brienne urges him to remain hopeful. Varys tells Tyrion how he became a eunuch, then shows him the sorcerer who castrated him, who is now his captive. He advises Tyrion to be patient in his quest for vengeance against Cersei. At Craster's Keep, the surviving Night's Watchmen, starving, come into conflict with their host. Craster and Mormont are slain in the struggle, and Sam flees with Gilly and her newborn son. Arya and Gendry are taken to the Brotherhood's secret cave, meeting their leader, Beric Dondarrion, who demands that the Hound undergo a trial by combat for his crimes. Margaery proposes that Sansa marry Loras, which Sansa agrees to, unaware he is gay. Daenerys meets with the slave master Kraznys to trade one dragon for the Unsullied army. Once the deal is struck, she commands the Unsullied to kill all the slave masters, and has her dragon burn Kraznys; she frees the Unsullied, who willingly follow her.
25	5	"Kissed by Fire"	Alex Graves	Bryan Cogman	April 28, 2013	5.35
Tyrion, knowing the Crown is deeply in debt to the Iron Bank, persuades Olenna to pay for half of the royal wedding. Sansa tells Littlefinger she wants to remain in King's Landing, as she secretly hopes to marry Loras. Littlefinger uncovers the Tyrell–Varys plot to marry Sansa to Loras and informs Tywin. To circumvent this, he decides to marry Sansa to Tyrion and Cersei to Loras over both Lannisters' objections. Stannis confesses his infidelity to his fanatical wife, Selyse, who says she knows and approves. Their daughter, Princess Shireen, sneaks into the dungeon to visit Davos and teaches him to read. The Hound is released after killing Beric in the trial by combat. Thoros of Myr, a priest of R'hllor, resurrects Beric, using the Lord of Light's power. Gendry decides to join the Brotherhood, who intend to ransom Arya to Robb. After being delivered to Roose Bolton at Harrenhal, and having his stump treated by the disgraced former maester Qyburn, a delirious Jaime reveals to Brienne that he killed "Mad King" Aerys II Targaryen to prevent him from destroying King's Landing with wildfire. Robb executes Lord Karstark after the latter murders two captive Lannister boys. With the Karstarks abandoning him, a desperate Robb hopes to renew his alliance with Walder Frey. Ygritte seduces Jon, who breaks his Night's Watch vows. Daenerys encourages the Unsullied to choose a leader among them; they choose Grey Worm.
26	6	"The Climb"	Alik Sakharov	David Benioff & D. B. Weiss	May 5, 2013	5.50
In King's Landing, Tywin forces Olenna into an agreement to marry Cersei to Loras. Cersei tells Tyrion that Joffrey, not she, ordered Ser Mandon to kill him during the battle. Tyrion shares news of his and Sansa's upcoming wedding with Shae and Sansa. Littlefinger taunts Varys about thwarting his plan with the Tyrells and reveals he handed over Varys's informant Ros to Joffrey, who tortured and killed her. In the Riverlands, Melisandre buys Gendry from the Brotherhood and predicts that Arya will kill many with brown, green, and blue eyes, and that they will meet again. Walder Frey agrees to renew his alliance with Robb in exchange for an apology and his uncle Edmure Tully, now lord of Riverrun, marrying one of Frey’s granddaughters instead. Roose Bolton agrees to send Jaime back to King's Landing but refuses to let Brienne go with him. At an unknown place, a mysterious man continues torturing Theon. In the North, Osha and Meera grow tense. Beyond the Wall, Sam flees with Gilly, while Jon and Ygritte climb the Wall with wildlings Tormund and Orell.
27	7	"The Bear and the Maiden Fair"	Michelle MacLaren	George R. R. Martin	May 12, 2013	4.84
In the North, Jojen tells Bran they must not stop at Castle Black but travel beyond the Wall to find the Three-Eyed Raven; Osha warns them about the White Walkers. Jon and Ygritte's relationship deepens, angering the jealous wildling Orell. After learning that Theon's greatest pride is his formidable phallus, his torturer cuts it off. Robb learns that Talisa is pregnant. Disgusted that they sold Gendry, Arya escapes the Brotherhood, only to be captured by the Hound. Melisandre tells Gendry that his father was King Robert Baratheon. Shae warns Tyrion that their relationship will end once he marries Sansa. Tywin and Joffrey discuss Daenerys; Tywin dismisses her as a potential threat. Daenerys reaches Yunkai and declares war on the city. Roose Bolton abandons Harrenhal for Edmure Tully's wedding at the Twins while Jaime bids Brienne farewell as he departs for King's Landing. Having a change of heart, Jaime returns to Harrenhal and rescues Brienne from a bear pit she had been trapped in by Locke.
28	8	"Second Sons"	Michelle MacLaren	David Benioff & D. B. Weiss	May 19, 2013	5.13
King's Landing hosts Tyrion and Sansa's wedding. Cersei shows her displeasure towards Margaery and Loras. At the wedding feast, Tyrion causes a drunken scene. Tywin demands that Tyrion quickly produce a Lannister heir, but Tyrion later assures Sansa their marriage will never be consummated without her consent. Sandor tells Arya that he is taking her to the Twins to ransom her to Robb. Stannis releases Davos, demanding that he respect Melisandre. She arrives in Dragonstone with Gendry, whom she seduces to extract his blood using leeches. In a magical ritual, Stannis casts the blood-filled leeches into a fire while naming the three usurpers: Robb Stark, Balon Greyjoy, and King Joffrey. Daenerys learns that Yunkai has employed mercenaries called the "Second Sons" to defend the city. One of their handsome lieutenants, Daario Naharis, kills the other leaders and pledges the company's loyalty to Daenerys. Sam and Gilly are attacked by a White Walker, which Sam destroys with a dragonglass dagger.
29	9	"The Rains of Castamere"	David Nutter	David Benioff & D. B. Weiss	June 2, 2013	5.22
Sam, Gilly, and her son arrive at the Wall. While hiding in a tower during a thunderstorm, Bran enters a panicked Hodor's mind to prevent him from accidentally revealing their hiding place to a group of wildlings below, unbeknownst to them, including Jon. Jon is suspected of still being loyal to the Night's Watch when he refuses to murder a farmer, whom Ygritte kills. Bran wargs into Summer to save Jon, who kills Orell before escaping, leaving a furious Ygritte behind with Chief Tormund. Osha, Rickon, and his direwolf, Shaggydog, depart for the Last Hearth to seek shelter from Stark bannermen from House Umber, while Bran, Meera, Jojen, Hodor, and Bran's direwolf, Summer, plan to go beyond the Wall to find the Three-Eyed Raven. With their army having defected, Yunkai agrees to Daenerys's demand to release all of its slaves. Robb arrives at the Twins and apologises to Walder for reneging on his marriage pact. Walder Frey appears to accept his apology while Edmure marries Roslin Frey, Walder's sole pretty granddaughter. After the newlyweds leave the feast, Walder's men suddenly attack their guests, murdering Stark's men, as well as Talisa and Catelyn, while Roose Bolton, who had secretly made a deal with the Lannisters, betrays and kills Robb. Ser Brynden "Blackfish" Tully, Catelyn's uncle, survives, having excused himself from the feast just prior to the slaughter to relieve himself. The Hound and Arya arrive at the Twins during the massacre, but the Hound carries Arya to safety.
30	10	"Mhysa"	David Nutter	David Benioff & D. B. Weiss	June 9, 2013	5.39
The "Red Wedding's" mastermind is revealed to be Tywin Lannister, who rewards House Frey with the seat of Riverrun and appoints Roose Bolton as Warden of the North. Theon learns that his captor is Ramsay Snow, Roose's bastard son, who had also been responsible for torching Winterfell, having betrayed the Ironborn who handed Theon over to him and killed them. Ramsay sends Theon's severed phallus to Balon with a demand that he remove his men from the North. While Balon is happy to give up on Theon, Yara leads a mission to rescue him. Arya and the Hound kill some Frey soldiers they encounter who are mocking Robb's death. Jaime and Brienne arrive in King's Landing, where Jaime is reunited with Cersei. Sam and Gilly encounter Bran's party in the Night Fort, and Bran has Sam promise not to tell Jon that he is still alive. Sam returns to Castle Black with Gilly, and Maester Aemon has him send ravens to warn the Seven Kingdoms about the White Walkers. Ygritte pursues Jon and shoots him with three arrows, but can't bring herself to kill him. He escapes, returning wounded to Castle Black. In Dragonstone, Davos helps Gendry escape to prevent him from being sacrificed to the Lord of Light. He persuades Stannis to respond to the Night's Watch's letter and provide them with aid in their war against the wildlings and White Walkers. In Essos, the freed Yunkai slaves hail Daenerys as "Mhysa" (mother).

== Cast ==
=== Main cast ===
- Peter Dinklage as Tyrion Lannister
- Nikolaj Coster-Waldau as Jaime Lannister
- Lena Headey as Cersei Lannister
- Emilia Clarke as Daenerys Targaryen
- Kit Harington as Jon Snow
- Richard Madden as Robb Stark
- Iain Glen as Jorah Mormont
- Michelle Fairley as Catelyn Stark
- Aidan Gillen as Petyr "Littlefinger" Baelish
- Charles Dance as Tywin Lannister
- Maisie Williams as Arya Stark
- Liam Cunningham as Davos Seaworth
- Stephen Dillane as Stannis Baratheon
- Carice van Houten as Melisandre
- Natalie Dormer as Margaery Tyrell
- John Bradley as Samwell Tarly
- Isaac Hempstead Wright as Bran Stark
- Jack Gleeson as Joffrey Baratheon
- Sophie Turner as Sansa Stark
- Oona Chaplin as Talisa Stark
- Sibel Kekilli as Shae
- Rose Leslie as Ygritte
- James Cosmo as Jeor Mormont
- Jerome Flynn as Bronn
- Alfie Allen as Theon Greyjoy
- Joe Dempsie as Gendry
- Rory McCann as Sandor "The Hound" Clegane
- Conleth Hill as Varys

=== Guest cast ===
The recurring actors listed here are those who appeared in season 3. They are listed by the region in which they first appear:

==== At and beyond the Wall ====
- Peter Vaughan as Maester Aemon
- Ben Crompton as Eddison Tollett
- Josef Altin as Pypar
- Mark Stanley as Grenn
- Luke Barnes as Rast
- Burn Gorman as Karl Tanner
- Will O'Connell as Todder
- Ciarán Hinds as Mance Rayder
- Kristofer Hivju as Tormund Giantsbane
- Edward Dogliani as the Lord of Bones
- Ian Whyte as Dongo
- Mackenzie Crook as Orell Skinchanger
- Robert Pugh as Craster
- Hannah Murray as Gilly
- Ross Mullan as White Walkers

==== In King's Landing ====
- Julian Glover as Grand Maester Pycelle
- Diana Rigg as Olenna Tyrell
- Finn Jones as Loras Tyrell
- Ian Beattie as Meryn Trant
- Daniel Portman as Podrick Payne
- Paul Bentley as the High Septon
- Will Tudor as Olyvar
- Esmé Bianco as Ros
- Josephine Gillan as Marei
- Pixie Le Knot as Kayla

==== On the Iron Islands ====
- Patrick Malahide as Balon Greyjoy
- Gemma Whelan as Yara Greyjoy

==== On Dragonstone ====
- Tara Fitzgerald as Selyse Florent
- Kerry Ingram as Shireen Baratheon
- Lucian Msamati as Salladhor Saan

==== In the North ====
- Art Parkinson as Rickon Stark
- Thomas Brodie-Sangster as Jojen Reed
- Ellie Kendrick as Meera Reed
- Iwan Rheon as Ramsay Snow
- Charlotte Hope as Myranda
- Kristian Nairn as Hodor
- Natalia Tena as Osha

==== In the Riverlands ====
- Tobias Menzies as Edmure Tully
- Clive Russell as Brynden Tully
- David Bradley as Walder Frey
- Tom Brooke as Lame Lothar Frey
- Tim Plester as Black Walder Rivers
- Michael McElhatton as Roose Bolton
- John Stahl as Rickard Karstark
- Gwendoline Christie as Brienne of Tarth
- Dean-Charles Chapman as Martyn Lannister
- Timothy Gibbons as Willem Lannister
- Noah Taylor as Locke
- Jamie Michie as Steelshanks Walton
- Richard Dormer as Beric Dondarrion
- Paul Kaye as Thoros of Myr
- Philip McGinley as Anguy
- Anton Lesser as Qyburn
- Ben Hawkey as Hot Pie

==== In Essos ====
- Dan Hildebrand as Kraznys mo Nakloz
- Clifford Barry as Greizhen mo Ullhor
- George Georgiou as Razdal mo Eraz
- Ian McElhinney as Barristan Selmy
- Ed Skrein as Daario Naharis
- Nathalie Emmanuel as Missandei
- Jacob Anderson as Grey Worm
- Mark Killeen as Mero
- Ramon Tikaram as Prendahl na Ghezn

The musicians Will Champion of Coldplay and Gary Lightbody of Snow Patrol made cameo appearances, and Bart the Bear 2 (a.k.a. "Little Bart") was the bear that fought in the pit at Harrenhal.

== Production ==
Game of Thrones rapidly became a critical and commercial success after it started airing in April 2011. A few days after ratings for the second season's premiere, "The North Remembers", hit a series high of 8.3 million viewers, HBO announced the show's renewal for a third season. Prior to that announcement, there had been rumors and reports that showrunners David Benioff and D. B. Weiss planned to shoot seasons three and four simultaneously. Benioff said that this would be very efficient, but impossible to write.

The ten episodes of the third season are longer than the previous seasons', about 54 or 57 minutes as opposed to about 52. The season's budget was reported to be around 50 million U.S. dollars.

=== Writing ===
The third season is based on the first half of the novel A Storm of Swords. Benioff had previously said that A Storm of Swords would need to be adapted in two seasons on account of its length. Benioff and Weiss also noted that they thought of Game of Thrones as an adaptation of the series as a whole, rather than of individual novels, which gave them the liberty to move scenes back and forth across novels according to the requirements of the screen adaptation. According to Benioff, the third season contains a particularly memorable scene from A Storm of Swords, the prospect of filming which was part of their motivation to adapt the novels for television in the first place. The writing credits for the third season now state "Written for television by", instead of the usual "Written by" credit.

Season 3 saw the first significant use of the Valyrian languages, spoken in doomed Valyria and its former colonies in Essos. The constructed languages were developed by conlanger David J. Peterson based on the few words Martin invented for the novels. Peterson had previously developed the Dothraki language, used principally in season 1.

=== Casting ===
The third season adds previously recurring actors Oona Chaplin (Talisa Maegyr), Joe Dempsie (Gendry) and Rose Leslie (Ygritte) to the series' main cast.

After an absence of one season David Bradley returns as Walder Frey, Ian McElhinney as Barristan Selmy, Peter Vaughan as Maester Aemon, Josef Altin as Pypar and Luke McEwan as Rast.

=== Crew ===
David Benioff and D. B. Weiss serve as main writers and showrunners for the third season. They co-wrote seven out of ten episodes. The remaining three episodes were written by Bryan Cogman, Vanessa Taylor, and the author of A Song of Ice and Fire, George R. R. Martin.

Daniel Minahan, Alex Graves, Michelle MacLaren, and David Nutter each directed two episodes. One further episode was directed by previous series cinematographer, Alik Sakharov, whereas another was co-directed by Benioff and Weiss, both making their directorial debuts, although only Benioff is credited for directing the episode.

=== Filming ===
The filming of the third season began in early July 2012, and concluded with the wrap of the unit filming in Iceland on November 24, 2012. Filming in Iceland, for scenes in five of the season's ten episodes, took place near Akureyri and Lake Mývatn. Dimmuborgir was used as the location for Mance Rayder's wildling army camp, and the Grjótagjá cave was used as establishing shot of Jon Snow and Ygritte in the cave although most of this scene was filmed in the studio. The filming in Iceland lasted eight days, as opposed to nearly a month for season 2. Kit Harington (Jon Snow) broke an ankle in an accident in July, which required the Iceland shoots to be pushed back to give him time to heal, as well as the occasional use of a body double.

The production was again based in Belfast, Northern Ireland, and continued to receive support from the Northern Ireland Screen fund. The production used various locations in Northern Ireland to film scenes in the North and the Riverlands. Gosford Castle in Armagh, was used as the base for Riverrun Castle, home of House Tully.

The production also returned to Dubrovnik in Croatia for scenes in King's Landing. Morocco, a new location, was used to film Daenerys' scenes in Essos such as the city of Astapor, for which locations in Essaouira were used, and Yunkai, which was filmed in Aït Benhaddou. A scene involving a live bear was filmed in Los Angeles.

=== Music ===
The U.S. indie rock band The Hold Steady recorded "The Bear and the Maiden Fair", a ribald folk song from Martin's novels. The recording is played over the end credits of episode three, and the song is sung by Brienne and Jaime's captors in the same episode. Set to music by series composer Ramin Djawadi, the recording was released on a seven-inch record on Record Store Day, April 20, 2013.

The soundtrack for the season was released digitally on June 4, 2013, and on CD on July 2, 2013.

== Reception ==
=== Critical response ===
Game of Thrones season 3: Critical reception by episode
Season 3 (2013): Percentage of positive critics' reviews tracked by the website Rotten Tomatoes

Review aggregator Metacritic has a score of 91 for season 3, indicating "universal acclaim", based on 25 reviews. On Rotten Tomatoes, the third season has a 96% approval rating from 419 critics with an average rating of 8.6 out of 10. The site's critical consensus reads, "Game of Thrones continues to deliver top quality drama for adults, raising the stakes even higher and leaving viewers hungry for more."

Variety compared it to a "theatrical blockbuster", while The Denver Post praised its "horrors of war", "danger of shifting alliances", "anguish of intra-family rivalries", and "glorious visuals". The New York Times gave the season a positive review and stated, "They're [The actors] all fun to watch, even when their characters don't have anything in particular to do besides relay information that we need to keep up with the story or keep straight the seven (so we're told) warring families." Hank Stuever of The Washington Post gave the season a positive review and stated, "Game of Thrones succeeds because it accommodates both the casual viewer and the rabid fanatic, which is a nearly impossible trick in an age in which we ingest television and other media in the manner of a chicken who has outsmarted the Skinner box."

Slant Magazine gave the season 3 out of 4 and found it an improvement over the previous season for its "firm footing" and the "newfound sense of certain direction", while The Philadelphia Inquirer highlighted its "rousing start". The New York Post stated, "Not as much sex as you may be used to, but plenty of action, and enough complexities to keep geeks, geniuses and fans glued to the strange and wonderful world of the Seven Kingdoms all spring." Newsday gave the season a positive review and stated, "Game of Thrones is an exploration of the human heart -- don't blame the series if what it finds there is often so ugly." The Guardian gave the season a positive review and stated, "For all the pleasures - storylines so satisfyingly complicated you need spreadsheets to make sense of them, CGI dragons that dive into the sea and then toast the caught fish with their fiery breath - Game of Thrones asks bracing questions of its audience."

Maureen Ryan of HuffPost praised its themes of compassion, betrayal and confusion, while Matt Zoller Seitz of Vulture praised its confidence and ambition. The Hollywood Reporter gave the season a positive review and stated, "Proving again that a genre series can be as serious and challenging as traditional dramas, Game of Thrones kicks off what should be its most ambitious season -- which is really saying something for this dense, layered epic." James Poniewozik of Time praised the premiere episode for its "flying dragons, family turmoil and, holy crap, giants!-it promises", although criticized its "jet-lagged hours of a return trip". On the other hand, Andy Greenwald of Grantland stated that the premiere episode was "outstanding, a globe-spinning, breast-baring, bug-stabbing blast".

The Independent gave the season 3 out of 5 and stated, "The show takes itself very seriously indeed -- any thing less, you suspect, and it would collapse under its own absurdity. But there is wit here, too, amid the sweat and chunky knitwear." Slate gave the season a positive review and stated, "Game of Thrones gives us much to ruminate on regarding power, honor, and family. But it also reminds us that whether one is rich or poor, man or woman, honorable or evil, in Westeros life ain't fair." Slant Magazine gave the season a positive review and stated, "Game of Thrones's best season yet comes with a typically great transfer and enough extras to please devotees for days." Empire gave the season 5 out of 5 and stated, "Every time Game Of Thrones threatens to become a 'guilty pleasure', it pulls off something awesome."

=== Accolades ===
For the 65th Primetime Emmy Awards, the third season received 16 nominations, including for Outstanding Drama Series, Peter Dinklage for Outstanding Supporting Actor in a Drama Series, Emilia Clarke for Outstanding Supporting Actress in a Drama Series, Diana Rigg for Outstanding Guest Actress in a Drama Series, and David Benioff and D. B. Weiss for Outstanding Writing for a Drama Series for the episode "The Rains of Castamere". That episode also won the 2014 Hugo Award for Best Dramatic Presentation, Short Form. Game of Thrones won the award for Outstanding Achievement in Drama for the 29th TCA Awards, and also received a nomination for Program of the Year. For the 20th Screen Actors Guild Awards, the cast was nominated for Best Drama Ensemble, Peter Dinklage was nominated for Best Drama Actor, and the series won for Best Stunt Team.

Year	Award	Category	Nominee(s)	Result	Ref.
2013	AFI Awards	AFI TV Award	Game of Thrones	Won	
2013	ASCAP Awards	Top Television Series	Ramin Djawadi	Won	
2013	EWwy Award	Best Supporting Actress, Drama	Natalie Dormer	Won	
2013	Artios Awards	Outstanding Achievement in Casting – Television Series Drama	Nina Gold	Nominated	
2013	Young Hollywood Awards	Actor of the Year	Kit Harington	Won	
2013	3rd Critics' Choice Television Awards	Best Drama Series	Game of Thrones	Won	
2013	3rd Critics' Choice Television Awards	Best Supporting Actor in a Drama Series	Nikolaj Coster-Waldau	Nominated	
2013	3rd Critics' Choice Television Awards	Best Supporting Actress in a Drama Series	Emilia Clarke	Nominated	
2013	3rd Critics' Choice Television Awards	Best Guest Performer in a Drama Series	Diana Rigg	Nominated	
2013	65th Primetime Emmy Awards	Outstanding Drama Series	Game of Thrones	Nominated	
2013	65th Primetime Emmy Awards	Outstanding Supporting Actor in a Drama Series	Peter Dinklage	Nominated	
2013	65th Primetime Emmy Awards	Outstanding Supporting Actress in a Drama Series	Emilia Clarke	Nominated	
2013	65th Primetime Emmy Awards	Outstanding Writing for a Drama Series	David Benioff and D. B. Weiss for "The Rains of Castamere"	Nominated	
2013	65th Primetime Creative Arts Emmy Awards	Outstanding Art Direction for a Single-Camera Series	Gemma Jackson, Frank Walsh, and Tina Jones for "Valar Dohaeris"	Nominated	
2013	65th Primetime Creative Arts Emmy Awards	Outstanding Casting for a Drama Series	Nina Gold and Robert Sterne	Nominated	
2013	65th Primetime Creative Arts Emmy Awards	Outstanding Cinematography for a Single-camera Series	Rob McLachlan for "Mhysa"	Nominated	
2013	65th Primetime Creative Arts Emmy Awards	Outstanding Costumes for a Series	Michele Clapton, Alexander Fordham, and Chloe Aubry for "Walk of Punishment"	Nominated	
2013	65th Primetime Creative Arts Emmy Awards	Outstanding Guest Actress in a Drama Series	Diana Rigg for "And Now His Watch Is Ended"	Nominated	
2013	65th Primetime Creative Arts Emmy Awards	Outstanding Hairstyling for a Single-Camera Series	Kevin Alexander, Candice Banks, Rosalia Culora, and Gary Machin for "Second Sons"	Nominated	
2013	65th Primetime Creative Arts Emmy Awards	Outstanding Interactive Program	Game of Thrones Season Three Enhanced Digital Experience	Nominated	
2013	65th Primetime Creative Arts Emmy Awards	Outstanding Makeup for a Single-Camera Series (Non-Prosthetic)	Paul Engelen and Melissa Lackersteen for "Kissed by Fire"	Won	
2013	65th Primetime Creative Arts Emmy Awards	Outstanding Prosthetic Makeup for a Series, Miniseries, Movie or a Special	Paul Engelen, Conor O'Sullivan, and Rob Trenton for "Valar Dohaeris"	Nominated	
2013	65th Primetime Creative Arts Emmy Awards	Outstanding Single-camera Picture Editing for a Drama Series	Oral Ottey for "The Rains of Castamere"	Nominated	
2013	65th Primetime Creative Arts Emmy Awards	Outstanding Sound Editing for a Series	Peter Brown, Kira Roessler, Tim Hands, Paul Aulicino, Stephen P. Robinson, Vanessa Lapato, Brett Voss, James Moriana, Jeffrey Wilhoit, and David Klotz for "And Now His Watch Is Ended"	Nominated	
2013	65th Primetime Creative Arts Emmy Awards	Outstanding Sound Mixing for a Drama Series (1 hour)	Matthew Waters, Onnalee Blank, Ronan Hill, and Mervyn Moore for "And Now His Watch Is Ended"	Nominated	
2013	65th Primetime Creative Arts Emmy Awards	Outstanding Special Visual Effects	Doug Campbell, Rainer Gombos, Juri Stanossek, Sven Martin, Steve Kullback, Jan Fiedler, Chris Stenner, Tobias Mannewitz, Thilo Ewers, and Adam Chazen for "Valar Dohaeris"	Won	
2013	Hollywood Post Alliance Awards	Outstanding Color Grading – Television	Joe Finley for "Kissed by Fire"	Nominated	
2013	Hollywood Post Alliance Awards	Outstanding Sound – Television	Paula Fairfield, Brad Katona, Jed Dodge, Onnalee Blank and Mathew Waters for "The Climb"	Won	
2013	Hollywood Post Alliance Awards	Outstanding Visual Effects – Television	Joe Bauer and Jabbar Raisani, Jörn Grosshans and Sven Martin, and Doug Campbell for "Valar Dohaeris"	Won	
2013	International Film Music Critics Association	Best Original Score for a Television Series	Ramin Djawadi	Nominated	
2013	29th TCA Awards	Outstanding Achievement in Drama	Game of Thrones	Won	
2013	29th TCA Awards	Program of the Year	Game of Thrones	Nominated	
2013	Gold Derby TV Awards 2013	Best Drama Series	Game of Thrones	Nominated	
2013	Gold Derby TV Awards 2013	Best Drama Supporting Actor	Peter Dinklage	Nominated	
2013	Gold Derby TV Awards 2013	Best Drama Supporting Actor	Nikolaj Coster-Waldau	Nominated	
2013	Gold Derby TV Awards 2013	Best Drama Supporting Actress	Emilia Clarke	Nominated	
2013	Gold Derby TV Awards 2013	Best Drama Supporting Actress	Michelle Fairley	Nominated	
2013	Gold Derby TV Awards 2013	Best Drama Guest Actress	Diana Rigg	Won	
2013	Gold Derby TV Awards 2013	Best Drama Episode	"The Rains of Castamere"	Won	
2013	Gold Derby TV Awards 2013	Ensemble of the Year	The cast of Game of Thrones	Won	
2013	IGN Awards	Best TV Episode	The Rains of Castamere	Nominated	
2013	IGN Awards	Best TV Series	Game of Thrones	Nominated	
2013	IGN Awards	Best TV Drama Series	Game of Thrones	Nominated	
2013	IGN Awards	Best TV Villain	David Bradley as Walder Frey	Nominated	
2013	IGN Awards	Best TV Villain	Jack Gleeson as Joffrey Baratheon	Nominated	
2013	IGN People's Choice Awards	Best TV Episode	The Rains of Castamere	Nominated	
2013	IGN People's Choice Awards	Best TV Series	Game of Thrones	Nominated	
2013	IGN People's Choice Awards	Best TV Drama Series	Game of Thrones	Nominated	
2013	IGN People's Choice Awards	Best TV Villain	David Bradley as Walder Frey	Nominated	
2013	IGN People's Choice Awards	Best TV Villain	Jack Gleeson as Joffrey Baratheon	Won	
2013	18th Satellite Awards	Best Supporting Actor – Series, Miniseries or Television Film	Nikolaj Coster-Waldau	Nominated	
2013	18th Satellite Awards	Best Supporting Actress – Series, Miniseries or Television Film	Emilia Clarke	Nominated	
2013	18th Satellite Awards	Best Television Series – Genre	Game of Thrones	Won	
2014	People's Choice Awards	Favorite Premium Cable TV Show	Game of Thrones	Nominated	
2014	People's Choice Awards	Favorite TV Anti-Hero	Nikolaj Coster-Waldau as Jaime Lannister	Nominated	
2014	People's Choice Awards	Favorite Sci-Fi/Fantasy TV Actress	Emilia Clarke	Nominated	
2014	Hollywood Makeup Artist and Hair Stylist Guild Awards	Best Period and/or Character Makeup – Television	Paul Engelen, Melissa Lackersteen	Nominated	
2014	American Cinema Editors	Best Edited One-Hour Series For Non-Commercial Television	Oral Norrie Ottey for "The Rains of Castamere"	Nominated	
2014	ADG Excellence in Production Design Award	One-Hour Single Camera Television Series	Gemma Jackson for "Valar Dohaeris"	Won	
2014	American Society of Cinematographers	One-Hour Episodic Television Series	Jonathan Freeman for "Valar Dohaeris"	Won	
2014	American Society of Cinematographers	One-Hour Episodic Television Series	Anette Haellmigk "Kissed by Fire"	Nominated	
2014	Costume Designers Guild Awards	Outstanding Period/Fantasy Television Series	Game of Thrones	Nominated	
2014	Cinema Audio Society Awards	Outstanding Achievement in Sound Mixing – Television Series – One Hour	Ronan Hill, Onnalee Blank, Mathew Waters, and Brett Voss for "The Rains of Castamere"	Won	
2014	11th Irish Film & Television Awards	Best Television Drama	Game of Thrones	Nominated	
2014	11th Irish Film & Television Awards	Actor in a Supporting Role – Television	Liam Cunningham	Nominated	
2014	11th Irish Film & Television Awards	Actor in a Supporting Role – Television	Aidan Gillen	Nominated	
2014	11th Irish Film & Television Awards	Actress in a Supporting Role – Television	Michelle Fairley	Won	
2014	11th Irish Film & Television Awards	Best Sound	Ronan Hill	Won	
2014	Astra Awards	Favourite Program – International Drama	Game of Thrones	Won	
2014	Directors Guild of America Award	Dramatic Series	David Nutter for "The Rains of Castamere"	Nominated	
2014	Golden Reel Awards	Best Sound Editing – Short Form Dialogue and ADR in Television	Jed Dodge and Tim Hands for "The Rains of Castamere"	Won	
2014	Golden Reel Awards	Best Sound Editing – Short Form Music	David Klotz for "The Rains of Castamere"	Won	
2014	Golden Reel Awards	Best Sound Editing – Short Form Sound Effects and Foley	Tim Kimmel for "The Rains of Castamere"	Nominated	
2014	Hugo Awards	Best Dramatic Presentation, Short Form	David Benioff, David Nutter, and D. B. Weiss for "The Rains of Castamere"	Won	
2014	Kerrang! Awards	Best TV Show	Game of Thrones	Won	
2014	Location Managers Guild Awards	Outstanding Location Television Program	Game of Thrones	Won	
2014	Location Managers Guild Awards	Outstanding Achievement by a Location Professional – TV Program	Robert Boake	Won	
2014	Producers Guild Awards	"The Norman Felton Award for Outstanding Producer of Episodic Television, Drama"	David Benioff, Bernadette Caulfield, Frank Doelger, Christopher Newman, Greg Spence, Carolyn Strauss, and D. B. Weiss	Nominated	
2014	Royal Television Society	International Program	Game of Thrones	Won	
2014	Saturn Award	Best Television Presentation	Game of Thrones	Nominated	
2014	Saturn Award	Best Performance by a Younger Actor on Television	Jack Gleeson	Nominated	
2014	Saturn Award	Best Supporting Actor on Television	Nikolaj Coster-Waldau	Nominated	
2014	Saturn Award	Best Supporting Actress on Television	Gwendoline Christie	Nominated	
2014	Saturn Award	Best Supporting Actress on Television	Michelle Fairley	Nominated	
2014	Screen Actors Guild Awards	Outstanding Performance by a Male Actor in a Drama Series	Peter Dinklage	Nominated	
2014	Screen Actors Guild Awards	Outstanding Performance by an Ensemble in a Drama Series	Alfie Allen, John Bradley, Oona Chaplin, Gwendoline Christie, Emilia Clarke, Nikolaj Coster-Waldau, Mackenzie Crook, Charles Dance, Joe Dempsie, Peter Dinklage, Natalie Dormer, Nathali Emmanuel, Michelle Fairley, Jack Gleeson, Iain Glen, Kit Harington, Lena Headey, Isaac Hempstead Wright, Kristofer Hivju, Paul Kaye, Sibel Kekilli, Rose Leslie, Richard Madden, Rory McCann, Michael McElhatton, Ian McElhinney, Philip McGinley, Hannah Murray, Iwan Rheon, Sophie Turner, Carice Van Houten, Maisie Williams	Nominated	
2014	Screen Actors Guild Awards	Outstanding Action Performance by a Stunt Ensemble in a Comedy or Drama Series	Rachelle Beinart, Richard Bradshaw, Ben Dimmock, Levan Doran, Jamie Edgell, Bradley Farmer, Jozsef Fodor, Dave Forman, Paul Herbert, Paul Howell, Daniel Naprous, Florian Robin, CC Smiff, Roy Taylor	Won	
2014	Visual Effects Society	Outstanding Animated Character in a Broadcast	Philip Meyer, Ingo Schachner, Travis Nobles, Florian Friedmann for "Raising the Dragons"	Nominated	
2014	Visual Effects Society	Outstanding Compositing in a Broadcast Program	Kirk Brillon, Steve Gordon, Geoff Sayer, Winston Lee for "The Climb"	Won	
2014	Visual Effects Society	Outstanding Created Environment in a Broadcast Program	Patrick Zentis, Mayur Patel, Nitin Singh, Tim Alexander for "The Climb"	Won	
2014	Visual Effects Society	Outstanding Visual Effects in a Broadcast Program	Steve Kullback, Joe Bauer, Jörn Großhans, Sven Martin for "Valar Dohaeris"	Won	

== Release ==
=== Broadcast ===
The day after the third season premiered in the U.S., it premiered in the United Kingdom on Sky Atlantic, in Australia on Foxtel, and in New Zealand on SoHo.

=== Home media ===
The third season was released on DVD and Blu-ray in region 1 on February 18, 2014, in region 2 on February 17, 2014 and in region 4 on February 19, 2014.

It was made available for purchase as a digital download on the iTunes store, in Australia only, in parallel to the U.S. premiere. However, on May 14, 2013, Foxtel blocked the Australian iTunes store from making the episodes available soon after they screened in the U.S. Season 3 was reported to be the most infringed TV show via torrents during spring 2013, estimated to be 5.2 million downloads via BitTorrent.

Game of Thrones: The Complete Third Season
Set details	Special features	
Format: AC-3, Blu-ray, DTS Surround Sound, Dubbed, NTSC, Subtitled, Widescreen; Language: English; Subtitles: English, French, Castilian, Czech, Hungarian, Polish, Dutch, Danish, Finnish, Greek, Hebrew, Norwegian, Portuguese, Romanian, Serbian, Swedish, Turkish; 16:9 aspect ratio; 5-disc set, 10 episodes	"A Gathering Storm": Look back at the stormy events of Season 2 in this 14-minute recap with cast and crew.; "The Politics of Marriage": Cast and crew examine the institution of marriage and its place in Game of Thrones.; "Inside the Wildlings": Go beyond the Wall with this introduction to the wildlings.; "New Characters": Meet the new faces in Season 3: Olenna Tyrell, Missandei, Mance Rayder, Tormund Giantsbane, Orell, Jojen & Meera Reed, Blackfish & Edmure Tully, Thoros of Myr, and Beric Dondarrion.; Deleted Scenes/Extended Scenes: Five deleted and extended scenes.; Twelve audio commentaries by, among others, Benioff, Weiss, Martin, Headey, Clarke, Fairley, Harington, Madden and more.; Blu-ray exclusive: "In-Episode Guide": In-feature resource that provides background information about on-screen characters, locations, and relevant histories.; "Histories & Lore": Learn about the mythology of Westeros as told from the varying perspectives of the characters themselves.; "The Rains of Castamere Unveiled": Get an in-depth look at the creation of the most pivotal episode of Season 3 in this comprehensive exposé featuring cast and crew.; "Roots of Westeros":Explore the interconnected web of relationships, rivalries, and conflicts between the noble houses of Westeros with this interactive guide.	
DVD release dates
Region 1	Region 2	Region 4
February 18, 2014	February 17, 2014	February 19, 2014

=== Copyright infringement ===
The third season of Game of Thrones was the most-pirated TV series in 2013.
