= Daario Naharis =

Character in Game of Thrones and related media

- A Song of Ice and Fire character Game of Thrones character
- Michiel Huisman as Daario Naharis
- First appearance: Literature: A Storm of Swords (2000); Television: "Second Sons" (2013)
- Last appearance: Television: "The Winds of Winter" (2016)
- Created by: George R. R. Martin
- Portrayed by: Ed Skrein (season 3); Michiel Huisman (seasons 4–6)

In-universe information
- Gender: Male
- Titles: Novels: Commander of the Stormcrows; Television: Commander of the Second Sons
- Significant other: Daenerys Targaryen
- Nationality: Tyroshi

Daario Naharis is a fictional character in the A Song of Ice and Fire series of fantasy novels by American author George R. R. Martin and its television adaptation Game of Thrones.

Introduced in A Storm of Swords (2000), Daario is the leader of a mercenary group from the continent of Essos called the Stormcrows. He subsequently appeared in Martin's A Dance with Dragons (2011).

Daario was portrayed by the English actor Ed Skrein and then by the Dutch actor Michiel Huisman in the HBO television adaptation.

== Character description ==
Daario is a confident and seductive, handsome, young warrior, and the commander of the Storm Crows, a company of sellswords comprising 500 mounted mercenaries. He is an efficient killer, bloody and ruthless, although entirely devoted to Daenerys Targaryen. The books reveal nothing about Daario's background, save for his Tyroshi heritage.

== Overview ==
Daario Naharis is not a point-of-view character in the novels, so his actions are witnessed and interpreted through the eyes of other people, especially Daenerys Targaryen. Daario is mostly a background character in the novels.

== Storylines ==
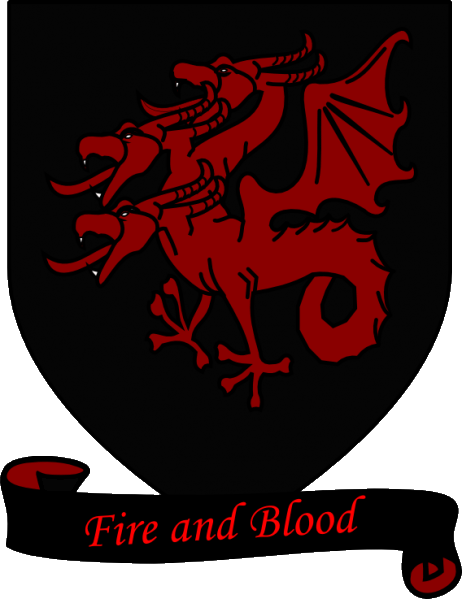
Coat of arms of House Targaryen

=== In the books ===
==== A Storm of Swords ====
The Stormcrows are hired by Yunkai to defend the city against Daenerys Targaryen's forces. Daenerys offers the Stormcrows gold if they defect to her. While the Stormcrows deliberate this offer, Daario (having been won over by Daenerys) kills the Stormcrows' captains and pledges the company's support to Daenerys. The Stormcrows aid Daenerys in her subsequent conquests of Yunkai and Meereen.

==== A Dance with Dragons ====
Following Daenerys' conquest of Meereen, she sends Daario to Lhazar to reopen trade routes between the two regions. After his return, Daenerys takes Daario as a lover but marries the Meereenese nobleman Hizdahr zo Loraq. With Yunkai besieging Meereen, Daenerys offers an exchange of hostages between the two camps to ensure peace, and Daario is amongst those given to Yunkai. However, Daenerys flies away on Drogon, and the Yunkai refuse to release Daario until Daenerys' other two dragons are executed.

=== In the show ===
Ed Skrein as Daario Naharis in season 3

The television series develops the backstory that Daario's alcoholic mother sold him to the fighting pits when he was a young boy. Daario was trained as a pit fighter and performed so well that he was released from slavery when his master died. After winning his freedom, Daario joined the Second Sons sellsword company.

==== Season 3 ====
Under the leadership of Captain Mero and second-in-command Prendhal na Ghezn, the Second Sons are hired by the slave city of Yunkai to fight against Daenerys' army. Smitten with Daenerys, Daario refuses to obey his superiors when they decide to assassinate her; he instead kills them and presents their severed heads to Daenerys. With the Second Sons under his command, Daario and his men pledge their allegiance to Daenerys. He then assists Jorah Mormont and Grey Worm in opening the gates of Yunkai, allowing Daenerys' forces to conquer the city.

==== Season 4 ====
On the march to the neighbouring slaving city of Meereen, Daario unsuccessfully attempts to romance Daenerys. At the gates of Meereen, Daario volunteers to fight Meereen's champion in single combat and swiftly kills him before taunting the Meereenese by urinating in front of the city. After Daenerys conquers the city, Daario persuades her to take him as her lover. When Yunkai begins to rebel against Daenerys' rule, Daenerys sends Daario and the Meereenese nobleman Hizdahr zo Loraq to negotiate with the city's masters.

==== Season 5 ====
Daario and Hizdahr are successful in their negotiations with the Yunkish, although the Yunkish insist, as part of the agreement, on reopening the city's fighting pits. Daenerys initially refuses, despite Daario's pointing out that his youth as a pit fighter gave him the skills necessary to join the Second Sons and meet her. Daenerys changes her mind after the Meereenese insurgents, the Sons of the Harpy, kill her advisor Ser Barristan Selmy. She takes Hizdahr as her husband but keeps Daario as her consort. After Daenerys flies off on her dragon Drogon during an attack by the Sons at the opening of the fighting pits, Daario and Jorah decide to leave Meereen to find her. Tyrion Lannister tries to join them, but Daario points out Tyrion is better suited to govern Meereen in Daenerys' absence.

==== Season 6 ====
Jorah and Daario discover that Daenerys has been captured by the Dothraki, and follow her to the sacred Dothraki city of Vaes Dothrak. They infiltrate the city and meet Daenerys, but she points out that they will be unable to escape the 100,000 Dothraki in the city. Daenerys instead sets fire to the Temple of the Dosh Khaleen, killing the khals but emerging unscathed. Amazed, the Dothraki bow down to Daenerys, and Daario follows suit. At the same time, Jorah leaves to find a cure for his greyscale; Daenerys and Daario march on Meereen with the Dothraki. Daenerys flies ahead on Drogon, and Daario arrives at the gates of Meereen. There, he finds the Sons of the Harpy massacring freedmen and leads the Dothraki charge to kill the Sons. With slavery finally abolished in Slaver's Bay, Daenerys decides to return to Westeros and reclaim the Iron Throne. However, she insists that Daario and the Second Sons remain to keep the peace. Daario is dismayed and declares his love for Daenerys, but ultimately agrees, realizing that Tyrion advised her to end their relationship.

== TV adaptation ==
In his first three appearances in season 3 of the television adaptation of the books, Daario Naharis is portrayed by the English actor Ed Skrein. Throughout the remainder of the series, he is portrayed by the Dutch actor Michiel Huisman. The reason for the change of actor was initially said to be because Skrein took on a role in the film The Transporter Refueled. However Skrein subsequently stated that the change was due to "politics". Both actors later starred together as enemies in 2023's Rebel Moon and its 2024 sequel.
