= And Now His Watch Is Ended =

- Game of Thrones episode
- Daenerys Targaryen tricks Kraznys and orders her new army, the Unsullied, to slay the masters and orders Drogon to scorch Kraznys. Many praised the scene, and highlighted Emilia Clarke's acting.
- Episode no.: Season 3 Episode 4
- Directed by: Alex Graves
- Written by: David Benioff; D. B. Weiss
- Cinematography by: Anette Haellmigk
- Editing by: Katie Weiland
- Original air date: April 21, 2013
- Running time: 53 minutes

Guest appearances
- Diana Rigg as Olenna Tyrell; Robert Pugh as Craster; Gwendoline Christie as Brienne of Tarth; Ian McElhinney as Barristan Selmy; Paul Kaye as Thoros of Myr; Richard Dormer as Beric Dondarrion; Noah Taylor as Locke; Iwan Rheon as Boy; Hannah Murray as Gilly; Thomas Brodie Sangster as Jojen Reed; Burn Gorman as Karl Tanner; Mark Stanley as Grenn; Ben Crompton as Eddison Tollett; Luke Barnes as Rast; Dan Hildebrand as Kraznys mo Nakloz; Nathalie Emmanuel as Missandei; Esme Bianco as Ros; Philip McGinley as Anguy

Episode chronology
| ← Previous "Walk of Punishment" | Next → "Kissed by Fire" |
- Game of Thrones season 3

"And Now His Watch Is Ended" is the fourth episode of the third season of HBO's fantasy television series Game of Thrones, and the 24th episode of the series. It was written by showrunners and executive producers David Benioff and D. B. Weiss and directed by Alex Graves, his directorial debut for the series. The episode's title comes from a chant made by the Night's Watch at the funeral of a fallen brother while at Craster's Keep.

The episode received huge acclaim from critics, with many praising its final scene and the performance of Emilia Clarke as Daenerys Targaryen. The episode marks the final appearance of James Cosmo (Jeor Mormont) and Robert Pugh (Craster).

== Plot ==
=== In King's Landing ===
Varys tells Tyrion of being made a eunuch by a sorcerer in Myr, before revealing that he captured the sorcerer and intends to take revenge on him. Ros informs Varys that Baelish may take Sansa when he leaves to wed Lysa Arryn, and Varys warns Olenna that Baelish may seek to control Sansa for control of the North.

Discussing the missing Jaime and the Tyrells' presence with Tywin, Cersei distrusts Margaery for her ability to manipulate Joffrey. Sansa tells Margaery that Cersei will not allow her to leave King's Landing, and Margaery says she would see Sansa wed to Ser Loras.

=== In the Riverlands ===
Locke and his men taunt Jaime for the loss of his sword hand. They trick him into drinking horse urine and he tries to attack them but is beaten instead. Brienne chastises Jaime for wanting to die, telling him to live and take revenge.

Arya, Gendry, and the Hound are taken to the Brotherhood's leader, Lord Beric Dondarrion. He calls the Hound a murderer, and Arya and the Hound argue over his execution of Mycah. In the name of the Lord of Light, Dondarrion sentences him to face him in trial by combat.

=== In the North ===
Bran dreams of chasing the three-eyed raven through the woods with Jojen, and climbs a tree in pursuit of the raven, but falls when Catelyn appears.

Arriving at what he believes is Deepwood Motte, Theon explains to his rescuer that he never killed the Stark boys, having Dagmer Cleftjaw burn two orphans instead, and reveals his remorse, declaring his "real father (Eddard Stark) lost his head at King's Landing". Theon then realises he has been taken back to the dungeon from which he escaped and is subdued by the guards, to the boy's amusement.

=== Beyond the Wall ===
Rast declares the Night's Watch cannot trust Craster, and Sam and Gilly discuss her newborn son. After a funeral for a fallen brother, Karl Tanner challenges Craster over their poor food, and Rast enrages Craster by mentioning his bastard parentage. Craster orders the Night's Watch out, but is taunted by Karl, who fatally stabs Craster when he tries to attack. When Jeor intervenes, Rast kills him. As a fight erupts, Sam flees with Gilly and her son and Rast threatens to kill Sam, if he ever finds him.

=== In Astapor ===
Exchanging the Unsullied army for one of Daenerys's dragons, Kraznys continues to insult her in Valyrian. Daenerys, whose first language is Valyrian and has known Kraznys has been insulting her the entire time, orders her new army to sack Astapor, kill all slavers and free every slave, and orders her dragon to kill Kraznys. Afterwards, she offers the Unsullied the choice to leave or remain with her as free men; none choose to leave, and Daenerys and her army depart.

== Production ==
=== Writing ===
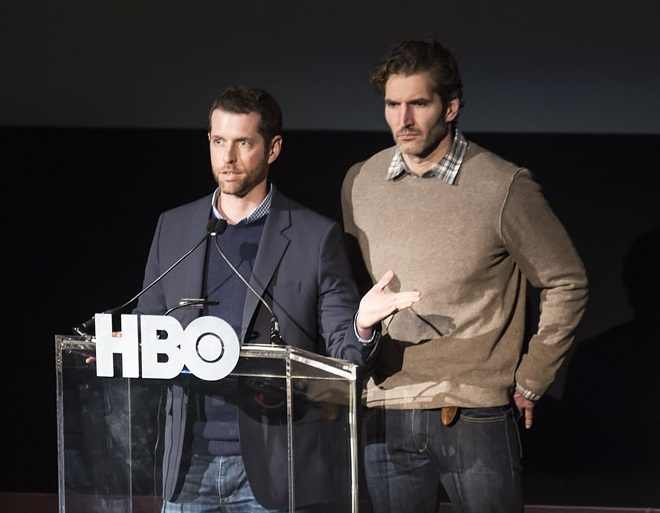
The episode was written by series co-creators David Benioff and D. B. Weiss.

"And Now His Watch Is Ended" was written by showrunners David Benioff and D. B. Weiss. It was based on George Martin's novels, chapters Tyrion X from A Clash of Kings and Jaime IV, Tyrion II, Samwell II, the first part of Arya VI, and the second half of Daenerys III from A Storm of Swords.

Benioff and Weiss considered this episode one of the "big ones" and a turning point of the series. Weiss said that when he was reading the books he was swept away by Daenerys's final scene, and remembered thinking how he'd be able to put it on screen if he could ever get to film it.

This final scene includes the first instance of the High Valyrian language in the series, apart from short stock phrases, spoken by Daenerys. Up to this point only the Astapori dialect of Low Valyrian, a creolized form of the ancient language of the old Valyrian Empire, had been heard, spoken by the slaver Kraznys. David J. Peterson, the language creator hired by the series, designed both versions of the tongue.

=== Casting ===
The episode reintroduces Lord Beric Dondarrion, now played by Richard Dormer. Dondarrion had previously been portrayed by David Michael Scott in his brief appearance in the first season episode "A Golden Crown", where he was entrusted by Lord Eddard Stark with the task of capturing Ser Gregor Clegane. This episode also marks James Cosmo's last appearance in the series, as his character Jeor Mormont is killed by his own men.

=== Directing ===
The episode was helmed by director Alex Graves, a newcomer to the production. The producers praised his work, in particular in the handling of the final scene at Astapor: "He took a scene that had us quite nervous – the number of people on set, the size of the action, the amount of the effects work – and had it all done in a few days. A scene that might take a feature eight days; for us it was two or three."

=== Filming ===
The interiors of the episode were shot at Belfast's The Paint Hall, including a new set representing the colossal Great Sept of Baelor at King's Landing. For the exteriors, the episode filmed extensively at the forests of Clandeboye Estate, where the sets of Craster's Keep and the encampment of Locke's band were built. The gardens where Olenna and Varys plot are parts of the Trsteno Arboretum, in Croatia.

The scenes with Daenerys were filmed in Morocco. While during the first three episodes the city of Astapor had been represented by the coastal ramparts of Essaouira, the plaza and the walls seen in the episode were sets from Atlas Studios, located five kilometres west of the city of Ouarzazate. The walls had been built to stand in for the city of Jerusalem in the 2005 film Kingdom of Heaven.

== Reception ==
=== Ratings ===
The ratings of the episode raised to a new record for the series, with a viewership of 4.87 million viewers and a 2.6 share among adults between the ages of 18 and 49. The encore was watched by another 1.03 million, totaling 5.90 million viewers for the night. In the United Kingdom, the episode was seen by 0.992 million viewers on Sky Atlantic, being the channel's second highest-rated broadcast that week.

=== Critical reception ===
The episode received critical acclaim, being consistently rated as the best of the season at the time of its airing. Review aggregator surveyed 21 reviews of the episode and judged 100% of them to be positive with an average score of 9.2 out of 10. The website's critical consensus reads, "'And Now His Watch is Ended' is an enthralling meditation on betrayal and revenge, bolstered by a mind-blowing surprise for those who would underestimate Daenerys Targarean [sic]." IGN's Matt Fowler rated it with a 9.3/10, highlighting "shocking deaths, brutal double-crosses and a Kingslayer undone made for some mighty fine Thrones". David Simms, writing for The A.V. Club, considered it "an insanely satisfying, shocking episode" and gave it an "A" grade. His colleague Emily VanDerWerff agreed on the score.

The final scene with Daenerys was unanimously praised. At Cultural Learnings, Myles McNutt found that the scene was one of the series's best sequences and considered it an impressive feat to have achieved a climax so satisfying for the viewer with only a relatively small number of scenes building up to it in the first three episodes. VanDerWerff felt that Emilia Clarke's performance was Emmy worthy. HitFix's Alan Sepinwall also praised her performance, remarking that "her big moment comes in a (fictional) foreign language, and the subtitles are barely necessary. That's how good she is."

==== Awards and nominations ====
| Year | Award | Category | Nominee(s) | Result | Ref. |
|---|---|---|---|---|---|
| 2013 | Primetime Emmy Awards | Outstanding Supporting Actress in a Drama Series | Emilia Clarke as Daenerys Targaryen | Nominated | |
| 2013 | Primetime Creative Arts Emmy Awards | Outstanding Guest Actress in a Drama Series | Diana Rigg as Lady Olenna Tyrell | Nominated | |
| 2013 | Primetime Creative Arts Emmy Awards | Outstanding Sound Editing for a Series | Peter Brown, Kira Roessler, Tim Hands, Paul Aulicino, Stephen P. Robinson, Vanessa Lapato, Brett Voss, James Moriana, Jeffrey Wilhoit, and David Klotz | Nominated | |
| 2013 | Primetime Creative Arts Emmy Awards | Outstanding Sound Mixing for a Comedy or Drama Series (One Hour) | Matthew Waters, Onnalee Blank, Ronan Hill, and Mervyn Moore | Nominated | |
