= Walk of Punishment =

- Game of Thrones episode
- Episode no.: Season 3 Episode 3
- Directed by: David Benioff
- Written by: David Benioff; D. B. Weiss
- Cinematography by: Matthew Jensen
- Editing by: Katie Weiland
- Original air date: April 14, 2013
- Running time: 52 minutes

Guest appearances
- Ciarán Hinds as Mance Rayder; Robert Pugh as Craster; Ian McElhinney as Barristan Selmy; Gwendoline Christie as Brienne of Tarth; Mackenzie Crook as Orell; Paul Kaye as Thoros of Myr; Clive Russell as Brynden "Blackfish" Tully; Tobias Menzies as Edmure Tully; Kristofer Hivju as Tormund Giantsbane; Julian Glover as Grand Maester Pycelle; Iwan Rheon as Boy; Noah Taylor as Locke; Mark Stanley as Grenn; Ben Crompton as Eddison Tollett; Luke Barnes as Rast; Burn Gorman as Karl; Hannah Murray as Gilly; Ben Hawkey as Hot Pie; Esmé Bianco as Ros; Daniel Portman as Podrick Payne; Philip McGinley as Anguy; Dan Hildebrand as Kraznys mo Nakloz; Nathalie Emmanuel as Missandei

Episode chronology
← Previous "Dark Wings, Dark Words"	Next → "And Now His Watch Is Ended"
- Game of Thrones season 3

"Walk of Punishment" is the third episode of the third season of HBO's medieval fantasy television series Game of Thrones, and the 23rd overall. The episode was written by series co-creators David Benioff and D. B. Weiss, and directed by Benioff. It first aired on HBO on April 14, 2013.

In the episode, Tyrion Lannister is named Master of Coin, and struggles to pay back the debt his predecessor left the kingdom in; Melisandre departs Dragonstone; Mance Rayder orders Jon Snow to climb the Wall with a group of wildlings; Theon Greyjoy escapes his captors at Winterfell; Arya and Gendry leave Hot Pie behind at the Inn before leaving with the Brotherhood; and Daenerys Targaryen negotiates with a slave master in Astapor to buy an army of soldiers. The title of the episode refers to a road in Astapor where slaves are crucified and displayed as examples to keep other slaves from rebelling.

The episode received positive reviews from critics, with many praising its final scene involving Jaime Lannister's hand being cut off, as well as the episode's levity and humor. It received a nomination for a Primetime Emmy Award for Outstanding Costumes for a Series at the 65th Primetime Creative Arts Emmy Awards.

== Plot ==
=== In Astapor ===
In the slaver city of Astapor, Daenerys and her followers debate on whether or not to purchase the highly trained slave army known as the Unsullied. She eventually negotiates with their owner, Kraznys, for all 8,000 of them by including one of her dragons in the sale, along with demanding his translator Missandei join her.

=== In King's Landing ===
Tywin plans to have Baelish wed Lysa Arryn to deprive Robb of allies, and names Tyrion the new Master of Coin. Discovering that, as treasurer, Baelish borrowed millions in gold from Tywin and tens of millions from the Iron Bank of Braavos, Tyrion fears his father will not forgive the debt and the Iron Bank may fund the Crown's enemies. Tyrion also rewards Podrick with prostitutes, later surprised to learn they refused payment.

=== At Dragonstone ===
As Melisandre prepares to sail for an unknown destination, Stannis begs her to give him another son, but she says he does not have the strength and her magic requires king's blood, which must be acquired from others who share Stannis' blood.

=== Beyond the Wall ===
The wildling army finds decapitated horses arranged in a spiral by the White Walkers, and Rayder tells Jon the fallen Night's Watchmen have become wights. Ordering Tormund to take a party, including Jon, to climb the Wall, Rayder says he will signal them with “the biggest fire the North has ever seen” to attack the Night's Watch. Meanwhile, the remaining Night's Watchmen continue south and take refuge at Craster's Keep, where Sam witnesses Gilly give birth to a boy.

=== In the North ===
Freed by the cleaning boy, Theon rides east to Yara at Deepwood Motte. However, he is overtaken by his captors. Their leader prepares to rape him, but the boy arrives, deftly slaying the soldiers and freeing Theon.

=== In the Riverlands ===
At Riverrun, during Lord Hoster Tully's burial at sea, his son Edmure fails in lighting the pyre and is shamed by his uncle, Brynden "the Blackfish". In conference with Robb, Edmure is chastised for engaging Ser Gregor Clegane. Catelyn discusses her pain with Brynden, and Talisa tends to Tywin's captured nephews, Martyn and Willem Lannister.

Arya confronts the Hound for killing her friend Mycah, but he is taken away. Arya and Gendry bid farewell to Hot Pie, who remains at the inn as payment by the Brotherhood after proving his skill as a cook.

En route to Harrenhal, Jaime convinces Locke that Brienne's father is a rich lord, and Locke stops his men from raping her. Jaime promises that Tywin will reward Locke if Jaime is returned; an offended Locke feigns acceptance, then severs Jaime's sword hand, causing Jaime to scream in horror.

== Production ==
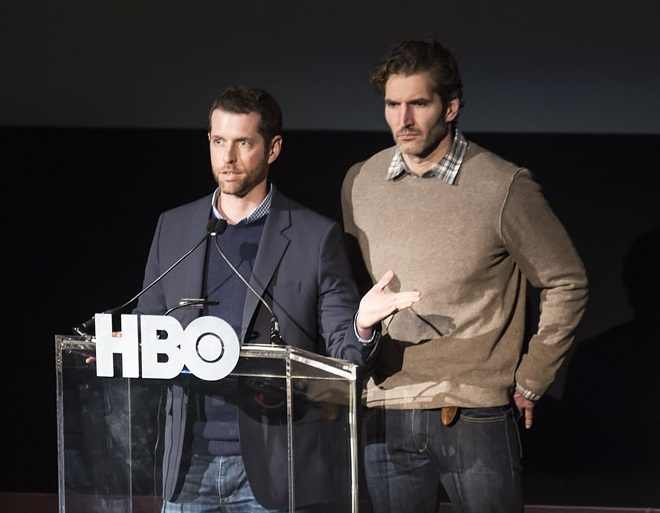
"Walk of Punishment" was written and directed by producers D.B. Weiss and David Benioff.

=== Writing ===
"Walk of Punishment" was written by the show creators and executive producers David Benioff and D. B. Weiss, based on material from George R. R. Martin's novel A Storm of Swords. The episode adapts parts of chapters 15, 16, 18, 20, 22, 24, 28, 32, 34 and 36 of the book (Catelyn II, Jon II, Arya III, Tyrion III, Jaime III, Daenerys II, Daenerys III, Jaime IV, Samwell II and Catelyn IV). The writers also included original storylines including Theon's flight, Tyrion bringing Podrick to a brothel, and Melisandre departing Dragonstone.

In the scene at the brothel, Tyrion claims that the last prostitute he introduces is one of the few women in the world able to perform "the Meereenese Knot". This is an inside joke referring to the name that Martin gave (after the legendary Gordian Knot) to a complicated structural problem that he had to face while writing the fifth book of the series, A Dance with Dragons. This book had to synchronize the arrival of several characters in the city of Meereen while keeping the chronology and causations in line and informing the reader of events happening in places where no point-of-view character was present. Martin worked on solving "the Meereenese Knot" from 2005 to 2011, and it was one of the main causes behind the late delivery of the book.

=== Directing ===
The episode was directed by the writing team itself, although to comply with the rules of the Directors Guild of America only Benioff is credited for directing. For both Benioff and Weiss, it was their first direction experience though the former had previously directed an experimental short film "When the Nines Roll Over".

=== Casting ===
"Walk of Punishment" introduces the Tully family at Riverrun, marking the first appearances of Lady Catelyn's uncle Brynden Tully, played by Clive Russell, and her brother Edmure, played by Tobias Menzies. Edmure Tully is depicted in the show more harshly than in the books. Talking about his character, Menzies described him as "as comic as Game of Thrones gets ... He's a little flawed, really." Dean-Charles Chapman first appears in the role of Martyn Lannister in this episode. In Season 4, however, Chapman returns portraying a different character: Tommen Baratheon, who was played by Callum Wharry in previous seasons.

=== Filming locations ===
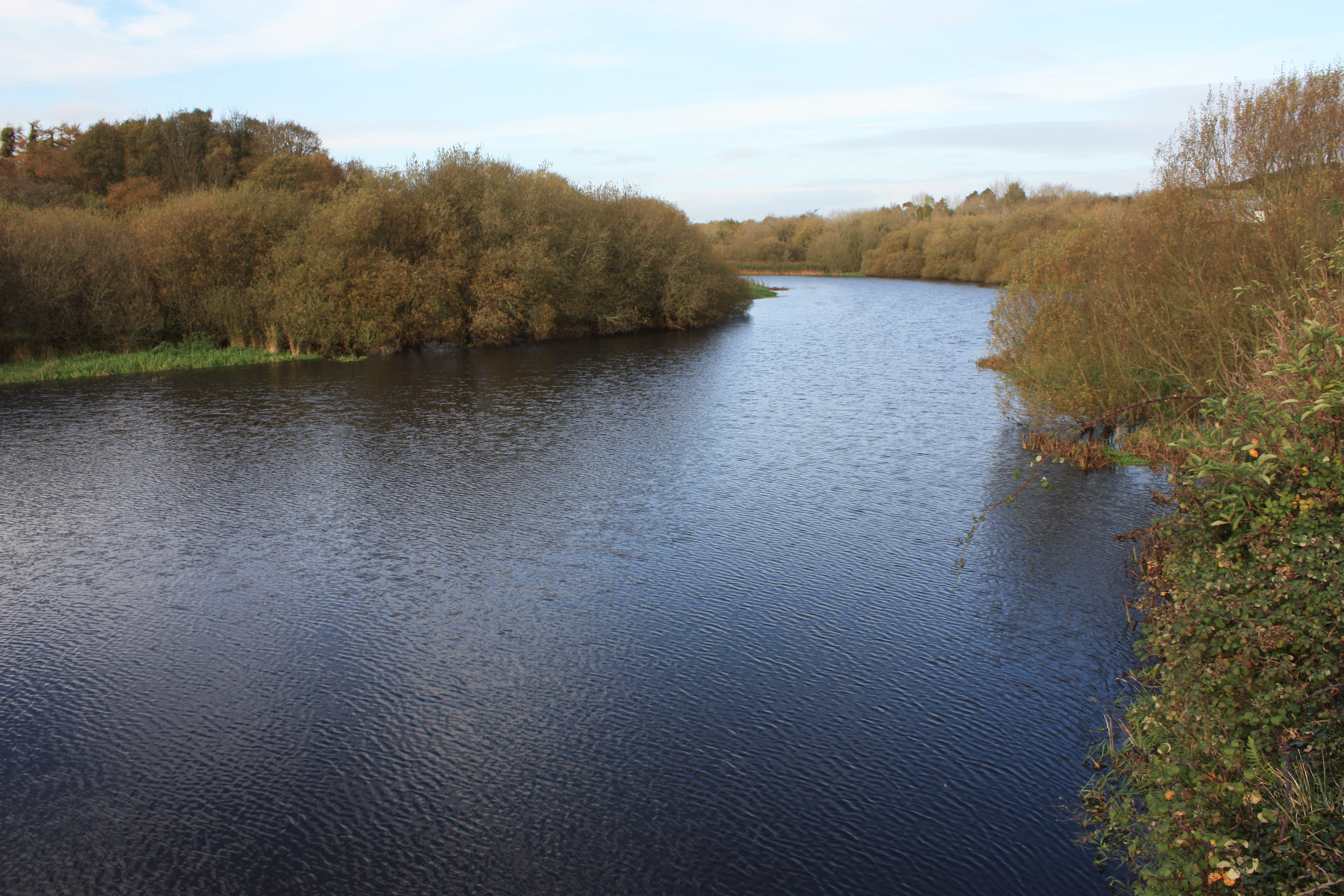
The river Quoile was used to depict the surroundings of the Riverrun castle

The interiors of the episode were filmed at the Paint Hall Studios in Belfast, the show's base of operations. For the exterior shots the production used many other locations across Northern Ireland: the Redhall State (County Antrim) for the Inn at the Crossroads, the Clandeboye Estate (County Down) for Craster's Keep, Downhill Strand (County Londonderry) as the coast of Dragonstone, and the River Quoile (County Down) as the setting of Lord Hoster Tully's funeral.

The storylines led by Jon Snow and Daenerys Targaryen continued to be filmed in Iceland and in the Moroccan city of Essaouira respectively.

=== Music ===
The band of Locke's men sing "The Bear and the Maiden Fair", heard for the first time in the series with music composed by Ramin Djawadi. The song, a very popular song in Westeros both among the commoners and the nobility, appears often in the original novels. Singing at the head of the group is Snow Patrol's frontman Gary Lightbody, in a cameo appearance.

The closing credits reprise the song in a new version recorded specifically for the series by the indie band The Hold Steady. The group, one of Benioff and Weiss's favourite bands, was chosen because they wanted the rendition "to be bawdy and a little sloppy – drunken musicians getting up on the table and jamming while the rowdy party continues around them".

The decision to place the song at the end of the episode, right after the amputation of Jaime's hand, was made to reinforce the surprise of the viewers: "It's such a shocking ending and when we read the scene in the books it was so shocking to us. To really hammer home the shock of that moment you need something unexpected. There's no version of a traditional score that would keep you as off balance as we wanted that scene to leaving you feeling."

== Reception ==
=== Ratings ===
The episode's initial airing was seen by 4.7 million viewers, setting a new viewership record for the show. Taking into account the viewers of the later repeat the figures rose to 5.8 million. In the United Kingdom, the episode was seen by 1.173 million viewers on Sky Atlantic, being the channel's highest-rated broadcast that week.

=== Critical reception ===
The episode was praised by critics; review aggregator Rotten Tomatoes surveyed 21 reviews of the episode and judged 95% of them to be positive with an average score of 8.3 out of 10. The website's critical consensus reads, "A bit of well-placed levity perfectly complements the shocking final scenes of 'Walk of Punishment', adding up to hands down the most thrilling episode of the season so far—minus one hand". Matt Fowler, writing for IGN, rated the episode 8.8/10, writing "A shocking chop and a rollicking rock song led us out of a strong Thrones episode." Writing for The A.V. Club, David Sims rated the episode an A−. Also at The A.V. Club, Emily VanDerWerff gave the episode another A−, praising its quickening of narrative pace. Time magazine reviewer James Poniewozik praised the episode, writing "one thing I love about it – as a fan of fantasy fiction since I was a kid – is that it has a level of ugly realism missing from much of the genre".
