= Second Sons =

- Game of Thrones episode
- Episode no.: Season 3 Episode 8
- Directed by: Michelle MacLaren
- Written by: David Benioff; D. B. Weiss
- Cinematography by: Chris Seager
- Editing by: Frances Parker
- Original air date: May 19, 2013
- Running time: 56 minutes

Guest appearances
- Diana Rigg as Olenna Tyrell; Julian Glover as Grand Maester Pycelle; Ian McElhinney as Ser Barristan Selmy; Hannah Murray as Gilly; Finn Jones as Loras Tyrell; Ed Skrein as Daario Naharis; Jacob Anderson as Grey Worm; Nathalie Emmanuel as Missandei; Mark Killeen as Mero; Ramon Tikaram as Prendahl na Ghezn; Daniel Portman as Podrick Payne; Ian Beattie as Ser Meryn Trant; Paul Bentley as the High Septon; Ross Mullan as a White Walker

Episode chronology
← Previous "The Bear and the Maiden Fair"	Next → "The Rains of Castamere"
- Game of Thrones season 3

"Second Sons" is the eighth episode of the third season of HBO's medieval fantasy television series Game of Thrones. The 28th episode of the series overall, it was written by series co-creators David Benioff and D. B. Weiss, and directed by Michelle MacLaren. It first aired on HBO on May 19, 2013.

In the episode, Tyrion Lannister and Sansa Stark are married in King's Landing; Gendry arrives at Dragonstone with Melisandre; Stannis Baratheon frees Davos Seaworth from the dungeons and reinstates him as his Hand; Arya Stark and Sandor "The Hound" Clegane travel through the Riverlands on their way to the Twins; Samwell Tarly and Gilly camp north of the Wall, and Daenerys Targaryen meets with the mercenary company of the Second Sons before the walls of Yunkai—the encounter from which the episode’s title is derived.

The episode was acclaimed by critics, with many praising the scenes showcasing Tyrion and Sansa's wedding and the performances, and achieved a viewership of 5.1 million during its initial broadcast. At the 65th Primetime Creative Arts Emmy Awards, the episode was nominated for Outstanding Hairstyling for a Single-Camera Series, and was selected by Peter Dinklage to support his nomination for Outstanding Supporting Actor in a Drama Series at the 65th Primetime Emmy Awards.

== Plot ==
=== In the Riverlands ===
Arya tries to kill the Hound when he is sleeping, but he is awake and offers her one attempt on his life, which she forfeits. Fearing a return to King's Landing, Arya is relieved as they head for the Twins, where the Hound intends to ransom her to Robb Stark, who is attending his uncle's wedding to Walder Frey's daughter.

=== In King's Landing ===
Tyrion visits Sansa to ease her apprehension on becoming his wife. In the Sept of Baelor, Cersei threatens Margaery with the story of House Reyne, former Lannister vassals whom Tywin exterminated when they rebelled against him. Sansa arrives at the Sept for her wedding and discovers Joffrey is escorting her down the aisle. At their wedding feast, Joffrey, after threatening to rape Sansa, calls for the traditional bedding ceremony, but his plan is thwarted when Tyrion threatens to castrate him. Tywin defuses the situation. Alone in their bedchamber, Tyrion tells Sansa he will not share her bed until she wants him to, leaving their marriage unconsummated.

=== At Dragonstone ===
Melisandre returns with Gendry and takes him to Stannis, who recognizes the familial resemblance. In the dungeons, Davos continues learning to read; Stannis visits him there. Davos naturally objects to the planned sacrifice, but Stannis remains resolved. He makes Davos swear to never raise his hand to Melisandre again, and frees him. Melisandre visits and seduces Gendry, tying him to a bed in the process. She places leeches on him to draw his royal blood. Stannis ritually burns them, speaking the names of the usurpers to his throne: Robb Stark, Balon Greyjoy, and Joffrey Baratheon.

=== At Yunkai ===
Jorah tells Daenerys that Yunkai has employed a mercenary group called the Second Sons. Daenerys meets with Mero, their crass leader, his co-captain Prendahl na Ghezn, and his lieutenant Daario Naharis; she attempts to bribe Mero to fight for her, but Mero makes sexually provocative statements and refuses. Back at camp, Mero decides to kill Daenerys; Daario is randomly selected to commit the assassination. After nightfall, he enters Daenerys' camp, disguised as an Unsullied. He enters her tent and reveals he killed Mero and Prendahl instead. She demands his loyalty and he accepts.

=== Beyond the Wall ===
Traveling south, Sam and Gilly camp at an abandoned hut for the night. When crows are heard cawing outside in a weirwood tree, Sam exits to investigate. A White Walker intent on taking Gilly's son confronts him. Sam stabs it with his dragonglass dagger, causing the Walker to disintegrate, allowing them both to escape.

== Production ==
=== Writing ===
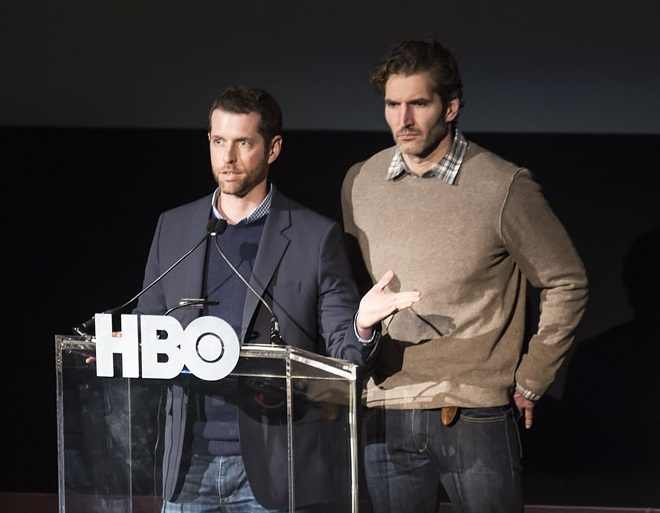
The episode was written by series co-creators David Benioff and D. B. Weiss.

"Second Sons" was written by the show creators and executive producers David Benioff and D. B. Weiss, based on material from George R. R. Martin's novel A Storm of Swords. The episode adapts parts of the book's chapters Samwell I, Sansa III, Davos IV, Daenerys IV, Samwell III and Arya IX.

=== Casting ===
The episode introduced the mercenary captains in service of Yunkai: Mark Killeen was cast as Mero (known as the Titan's Bastard), Ed Skrein the recurring role of Daario Naharis, and Ramon Tikaram the part of Prendahl na Ghezn. Tikaram is mistakenly credited as "Ramon Tikrum" in the closing credits.

=== Filming locations ===
Most of the scenes of the episode were shot in the Belfast studios of The Paint Hall, including the wedding of Tyrion and Sansa that was filmed at the huge semicircular set of the Great Sept of Baelor in mid September 2012. For this scene, a few hundred extras were recruited.

== Reception ==
=== Ratings ===
The episode received 5.1 million viewers, an increase from the previous week, with an 18-49 demographic of 2.6. In the United Kingdom, the episode was seen by 0.907 million viewers on Sky Atlantic, being the channel's highest-rated broadcast that week.

=== Critical reception ===
"Second Sons" received critical acclaim. Review aggregator Rotten Tomatoes surveyed 20 reviews of the episode and judged 100% of them to be positive with an average score of 8 out of 10. The website's critical consensus reads, "'Second Sons' shines through efficient storytelling -- and a comparatively low number of storylines to keep track of this week." Metacritic scored the episode 9.1 out of 10 based on 11 reviews, calling the episode "universally acclaimed".

Writing for IGN, Matt Fowler rated the episode a 9.0/10, and wrote "This week's well-crafted and wonderfully acted Game of Thrones gave us a cold wedding, a hot bath and a blood-letting." He especially praised the scenes between Sansa and Tyrion and between Ser Davos and Stannis. David Sims and Emily VanDerWerff, both writing for The A.V. Club, gave the episode "B" ratings. Sims was frustrated by the episode's meandering pace, but praised the end of the episode, with Sam killing the white walker, as "the most crucial, fascinating, electric moment of the night". VanDerWerff praised the use of nudity in the episode, writing "...I actually think Game Of Thrones has gotten quite a bit better at utilizing nudity and sex in the midst of everything else as a method of telling its story. It’s come a long way from the 'sexposition' days of season one, when it sometimes seemed like the series would toss some breasts into the background of a scene just in case we got bored of hearing somebody talk at length."

=== Accolades ===
Due to his nomination, Peter Dinklage submitted this episode for consideration for the Primetime Emmy Award for Outstanding Supporting Actor in a Drama Series for the 65th Primetime Emmy Awards.

At the 65th Primetime Creative Arts Emmy Awards, the episode was nominated for Outstanding Hairstyling for a Single-Camera Series.
