= Brienne of Tarth =

Character from A Song of Ice and Fire

Ser Brienne of Tarth
- A Song of Ice and Fire character Game of Thrones character
- Gwendoline Christie as Brienne of Tarth
- First appearance: Novel: A Clash of Kings (1998); Television: "What Is Dead May Never Die" (2012)
- Last appearance: Television: "The Iron Throne" (2019)
- Created by: George R. R. Martin
- Adapted by: D.B. Weiss & David Benioff (Game of Thrones)
- Portrayed by: Gwendoline Christie

In-universe information
- Aliases: The Maid of Tarth; Brienne the Beauty; Brienne the Blue
- Gender: Female
- Occupation: Warrior; Knight; Novels: Rainbow Guard; Television: Kingsguard to Renly Baratheon; Knight of the Seven Kingdoms; Lord Commander of Kingsguard to Bran the Broken
- Family: House Tarth
- Significant other: Television: Jaime Lannister
- Relatives: Selwyn Tarth (father); Galladon Tarth (brother); Arianne Tarth (sister); Alysanne Tarth (sister)

Brienne of Tarth is a fictional character in George R. R. Martin's A Song of Ice and Fire series of fantasy novels and its television adaptation, Game of Thrones. She is a prominent point of view character in the fourth novel, A Feast for Crows.

Brienne is introduced in the second novel of the series, 1998's A Clash of Kings, as a warrior fighting for the honor of serving in the Kingsguard of Renly Baratheon. She later swears her loyalty to Catelyn Stark and vows to return the captive Jaime Lannister to King's Landing in exchange for Sansa and Arya Stark, whom Catelyn believes are being held by the Lannisters. She additionally appears in A Feast for Crows (2005) and A Dance with Dragons (2011). Because she is a woman, Brienne is barred from serving as a knight, even though she is one of the most honorable and skilled warriors in all of Westeros. Her personal struggle towards honor, justice, and recognition has received significant critical attention, as has her complex relationship with Jaime, and she is one of the more popular characters in both the novels and television show.

In the television series, Brienne is portrayed by English actress Gwendoline Christie and is introduced in season two. After appearing as a recurring cast member for two seasons, Christie was promoted to the main cast from season four onwards. Christie has received significant critical praise for her portrayal. For her performance in season three, she was nominated for a Saturn Award for Best Supporting Actress on Television and for two Screen Actors Guild Awards, alongside the rest of the cast, for the third and fourth seasons. In 2019, she was nominated for the Primetime Emmy Award for Outstanding Supporting Actress in a Drama Series for her performance in the series's final season.

== Character ==
=== Background ===
Brienne is the daughter and only surviving child of Lord Selwyn Tarth, lord of Evenfall Hall on the island of Tarth. House Tarth is a bannerman to House Baratheon, the lord paramount of the Stormlands. Brienne's mother died when she was a child; she had a single older brother, Galladon, who drowned when she was 8, and two younger sisters, both of whom died in infancy. As a child, Brienne was under the tutelage of Septa Roelle, who found fault in everything about her and destroyed her self-esteem. She told Brienne that, though a man would marry her, as she is heiress to her father's land, he could never desire her.

Brienne's father tried to find her a suitor to wed. This proved to be difficult, however, due to both Brienne's resistance and her ungainly appearance. Nonetheless, three successive but ultimately unsuccessful betrothals were attempted. The first was when she was 7 and her fiancé was 10, but he died of an illness. Next, a betrothal was brokered by the lord of the land, of poor House Connington, to his young, newly knighted heir, Ronnet, but young Ser Ronnet broke the betrothal the first time he met Brienne.

Brienne's father's last attempt was to betroth her at 16 to Ser Humfrey Wagstaff, a middle-aged friend of his who was castellan of another house. Humfrey informed Brienne that she was expected to give up her training and become more feminine after their wedding. Brienne rejoined that she would acquiesce, but only if Wagstaff could beat her in combat. Their fight resulted in three broken bones and a broken betrothal.

Brienne had begged Tarth's master-at-arms Ser Goodwin to teach her to fight. As her skills grew, so did her confidence. He made her get over her inability to inflict pain by slaughtering pigs. At one point in her history, Brienne met Renly Baratheon when he visited her island on a coming-of-age tour. He treated Brienne with courtesy and respect, and danced with her; as a result, she fell in unrequited love with him. When the War of Five Kings begins, with Stannis and Renly Baratheon both claiming the crown, Tarth remains neutral, but Brienne gets her father's permission to go independently and declare for Renly.

=== Appearance ===
Brienne is described as unfeminine in appearance and is considered unattractive. She is very tall, muscular, flat-chested, and ungainly, with straw-colored hair and broad, coarse features that are covered in freckles. Her teeth are prominent and crooked, her mouth is wide, her lips are swollen, and her nose has been broken more than once. However, her large blue eyes are described as rather beautiful by both Catelyn Tully and Jaime Lannister.

=== Personality and development ===
==== In the books ====
In the novel A Feast for Crows, Brienne describes herself as "the only child the gods let [my father] keep. The freakish one, one not fit to be son or daughter." In "Beyond the Wall", a collection of essays, Caroline Spector describes Brienne as a "study in heartbreaking contradictions. She embraces the romantic ideals of her culture, both emotionally and through her actions, but is continually betrayed by the real world simply because she cannot turn herself into the woman the Westerosi legends tell her she should be."

==== In the TV adaptation ====
Charlie Harwood of HBO Watch describes Brienne as "loyal, stubborn, headstrong, and judgmental. Despite the repeated insults from knights, who mockingly call her 'Brienne the Beauty', she holds a simple idea of knighthood, believing that knights should be chivalrous and always honor their vows." In an interview for SFX magazine, Gwendoline Christie described Brienne as an outsider who has had to develop "outer strength that often matches or supersedes that of any man in order to be treated with equality. She doesn't want to get married...yet she's internally romantic...she has an overriding sense of honour and what is right, and that's what makes her such a brilliant character to play: that her outer is so stable and masculine, but inside she's so fragile."

== Storylines ==
=== In the books ===
==== A Clash of Kings ====
Brienne joins Renly Baratheon's army when he marches on King's Landing. She wins a melee at Bitterbridge held by Renly and is permitted to join Renly's Rainbow Guard as her prize. When it becomes apparent that Renly will be forced to battle his surviving brother, Stannis Baratheon, Brienne is assigned as his standard-bearer. However, before the battle, in which Renly intends his brother's death, Renly is assassinated by a shadow. Brienne is accused of the murder before Catelyn Stark is able to convince those present of her innocence, and Brienne accompanies Catelyn back to Riverrun. Although Brienne wishes to have revenge on Stannis for Renly's death, Catelyn persuades Brienne to serve her instead. Catelyn later goes to visit the captive Jaime Lannister in the dungeons; when Jaime begins to mock Catelyn's recently deceased husband Ned's infidelity, Catelyn calls for Brienne's sword.

==== A Storm of Swords ====
Catelyn has Jaime sent to King's Landing to exchange him for her captive daughters, Sansa and Arya, escorted by Brienne and Jaime's cousin Ser Cleos Frey. They are attacked by outlaws, who kill Cleos, and Jaime tries to escape in the commotion. Brienne restrains Jaime, but they are captured by the mercenary company the Brave Companions, which is allied to House Bolton. When their leader, Vargo Hoat, cuts off Jaime's hand, Brienne convinces Jaime to live to have revenge on Hoat. In return, Jaime stops the Brave Companions from raping Brienne. The two prisoners are taken to Harrenhal, where Jaime reveals that he killed Mad King Aerys II Targaryen to stop him from burning King's Landing. Roose Bolton allows Jaime to return to King's Landing but allows Hoat to keep Brienne as his prize. Hoat attempts to rape Brienne, but she bites off his ear, and Hoat throws her into a bear pit before Jaime returns to have her released.

Brienne and Jaime arrive in King's Landing to find that King Joffrey Baratheon has been poisoned, the Freys have murdered Catelyn Stark, and both Arya and Sansa have fled the city. Renly's lover, Ser Loras Tyrell, accuses Brienne of Renly's murder, and Jaime has Brienne imprisoned for her own safety. Jaime allows Loras to speak to Brienne, and she convinces him of her innocence. Jaime releases Brienne and gives her a sword forged from Ned Stark's Valyrian steel sword "Ice"; Jaime asks her to name the sword "Oathkeeper". Jaime asks Brienne to find Sansa and fulfill her oath to Catelyn.

==== A Feast for Crows ====
At Duskendale, Brienne encounters Tyrion Lannister's squire Podrick Payne and allows him to join her. During her journey through the Riverlands, she finds Ser Hyle Hunt, whom she knew from Renly's camp, and hires Nimble Dick Crabb as a guide. (He is killed when Brienne encounters some of the Brave Companions.) Brienne eventually arrives at an inn at the crossroads, where she meets Arya's former traveling companion, Gendry, now helping shelter a group of orphans. Another group of Brave Companions attacks the inn, and Brienne is forced to intervene to protect the children. She is grievously wounded by the outlaw Biter before the Brotherhood Without Banners arrives to kill the Companions. The Brotherhood takes Brienne, Podrick, and Ser Hyle Hunt—who had been following them—captive and presents them to their leader, Lady Stoneheart, whom Brienne is horrified to realize is a reanimated Catelyn Stark. Stoneheart accuses Brienne of serving the Lannisters and forces her to choose between killing Jaime or being hanged. When Brienne refuses to choose, Stoneheart orders her and her group hanged. Seeing Podrick dying, Brienne screamed a word.

==== A Dance with Dragons ====
Brienne confronts Jaime at the Lannister camp at Pennytree, and entreats him to come with her and save Sansa, whom she thinks is Sandor "the Hound" Clegane.

=== In the show ===
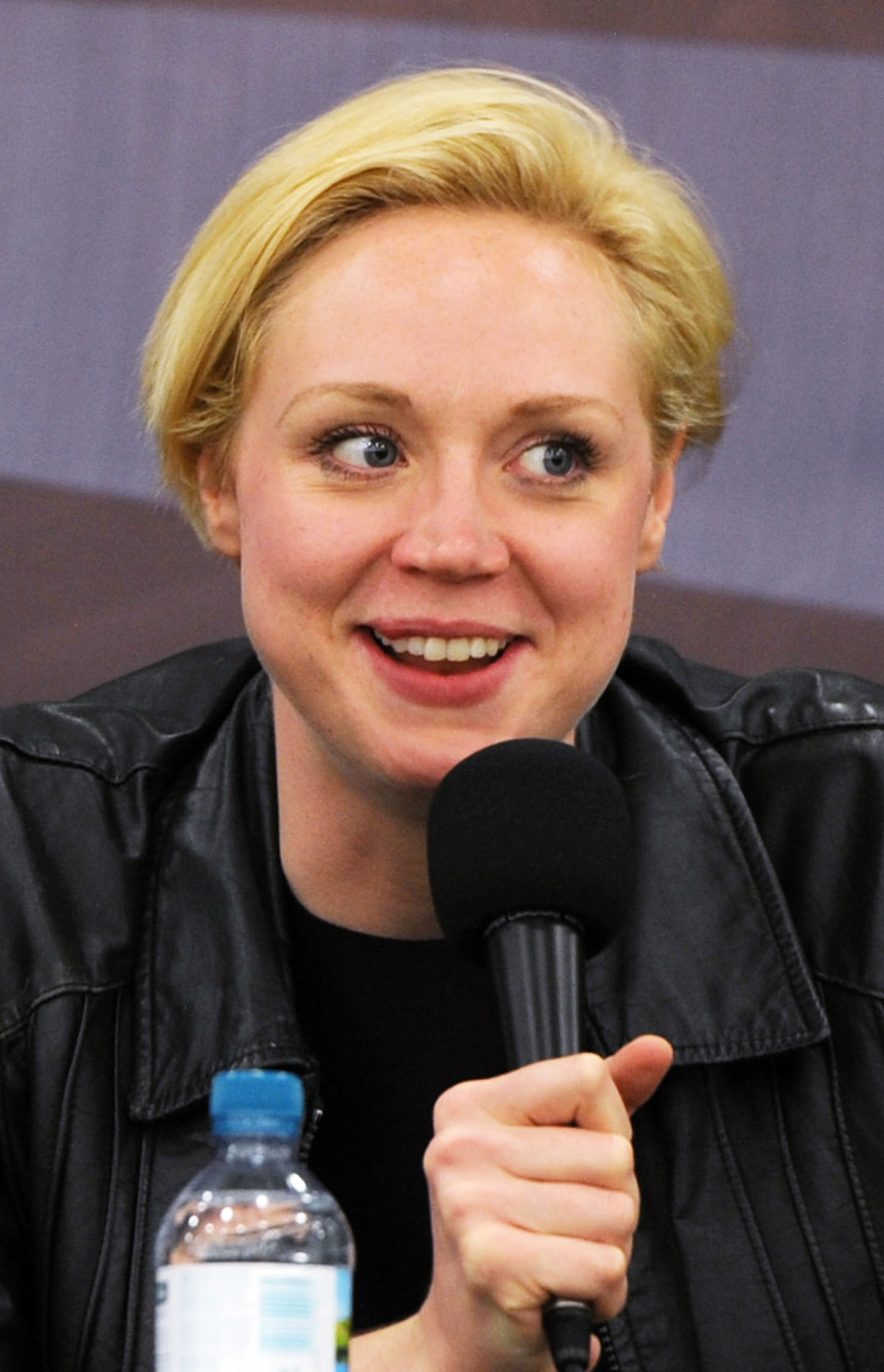
Gwendoline Christie plays the role of Brienne of Tarth in the television series

==== Season 2 ====
Brienne is first introduced when she defeats Ser Loras Tyrell to win a sword tournament held by Renly Baratheon, who has declared himself king, and is rewarded with a place in his Kingsguard. Catelyn Stark arrives at Renly's camp shortly thereafter and successfully negotiates an alliance between Robb Stark and Renly. However, Renly is promptly slain by a shadow demon assuming the appearance of his brother and rival, Stannis, who has discovered his status as the rightful heir to House Baratheon. Renly had intended to eliminate Stannis the following day. Brienne kills two members of Renly's Kingsguard in self-defense when they attack her, believing she murdered Renly. Catelyn advises her to retreat with her back to Robb's camp in the Westerlands. Brienne then swears allegiance to Catelyn. At Robb's camp, Catelyn releases the prisoner, Ser Jaime Lannister, and assigns Brienne the task of escorting him to King's Landing, compelling Jaime to vow to return Sansa and Arya Stark to Catelyn in exchange.

==== Season 3 ====
In the Riverlands, Brienne and Jaime are captured by a squad of House Bolton soldiers. Jaime dissuades the soldiers from raping Brienne by claiming that her father will reward them with sapphires for returning Brienne unharmed, but their leader, Locke, cuts off Jaime's sword hand when he tries to bargain to be untied. Brienne and Jaime are taken to Harrenhal, where Jaime reveals to Brienne that he killed Mad King Aerys II Targaryen to stop him from burning King's Landing. Roose Bolton has Jaime released but keeps Brienne prisoner for abetting treason. Locke tries to ransom Brienne but is offended by what he perceives to be Selwyn Tarth's paltry ransom (compared to the sapphires Jaime had led him to expect) and instead throws Brienne into a pit with a bear and only a wooden sword with which to defend herself. When Jaime learns that Brienne has been left at Locke's mercy, he returns to Harrenhal, finds Brienne in trouble, and jumps in to save her by coming in between her and the bear. Jaime then forces Locke's men to pull up both Brienne and himself. They then complete their journey to King's Landing.

==== Season 4 ====
Brienne cannot return Sansa to Catelyn Stark, as the Freys have murdered Catelyn; Jaime argues that Sansa—now married to Tyrion—is safer staying in King's Landing. Brienne speaks with Margaery Tyrell and explains that she did not kill Renly, then attends King Joffrey Baratheon's wedding to Margaery. At the wedding, Cersei Lannister confronts Brienne and implies that Brienne loves Jaime, and Brienne witnesses Joffrey's death by poisoning. After Tyrion is accused of the murder, his brother Jaime gives Brienne a Valyrian steel sword (which Brienne names "Oathkeeper") and a coat of armor in support of her mission to find Sansa and take her to safety. He also gives her Tyrion's former squire, Podrick Payne, whose life is in danger after he refuses to offer false testimony against Tyrion.

On their way through the Riverlands, Brienne and Podrick meet Arya Stark's former travelling companion Hot Pie. After learning from him that Arya is alive, they decide to travel to the Vale, as they suspect she is being sheltered by her aunt, Lysa Arryn. There, Brienne encounters Arya and her escort, Sandor "the Hound" Clegane. When Arya refuses to go with Brienne, Brienne and the Hound fight, culminating in Brienne's forcing him off a cliff and dealing him an apparently deadly wound, although Arya escapes in the confusion.

==== Season 5 ====
After searching fruitlessly for Arya, the dispirited Brienne and Podrick spot Sansa Stark in a tavern in the company of Lord Petyr Baelish, and Brienne offers Sansa her services. Sansa refuses, and Brienne, realizing that she is in danger from Baelish, flees with his guards in pursuit. Still, undeterred, she follows Sansa to the ancestral Stark stronghold of Winterfell, where she has been wed to Roose's sadistic son, Ramsay. Staying in a nearby town, Brienne manages to have a message smuggled into Winterfell instructing Sansa how to signal if she needs help. The woman who relays this message is tortured and dies before revealing who sent it. Sansa eventually manages to escape the room where Ramsay has held her captive, while the Boltons are preparing to battle Stannis's approaching forces. However, Brienne has left to find and kill Stannis—having sworn to avenge his brother Renly's death—before she can see Sansa's signal. Brienne finds Stannis gravely wounded in the aftermath of the battle and, after he confesses to his role in Renly's death, she executes him, telling him she is doing so in the name of the rightful king, Renly.

==== Season 6 ====
Brienne follows a group of Bolton soldiers sent to recapture Sansa, who had fled Winterfell along with Ramsay's slave Theon Greyjoy, and kills the soldiers before offering her services again to Sansa, who accepts. Brienne then reveals to Sansa that Arya is still alive, though her exact whereabouts are unknown. Brienne, Podrick, and Sansa travel to Castle Black (with Theon having returned to the Iron Islands), where Sansa's half-brother, Jon Snow, has just stepped down as Lord Commander of the Night's Watch. At Castle Black, she meets Stannis's former advisors, Davos Seaworth and Melisandre, and sarcastically tells them that she killed Stannis and still blames them for their roles in Renly's death. Additionally, a wildling named Tormund Giantsbane becomes interested in Brienne, which she finds annoying. Brienne then escorts Sansa to meet Littlefinger, who reveals that Sansa's great-uncle Brynden "Blackfish" Tully has captured House Tully's home, Riverrun, from the Freys. When Jon and Sansa leave Castle Black to gather forces to overthrow Ramsay Bolton, Sansa sends Brienne to Riverrun to seek the Blackfish's support. Brienne claims that Davos cannot be trusted because of his former support for Stannis and his subsequent abandonment, even though Davos only left on Stannis's orders. Brienne arrives at Riverrun to find it besieged by the Frey and Lannister armies, led by Jaime. Jaime permits Brienne to enter Riverrun to talk to the Blackfish, who is sympathetic to Sansa's cause but refuses to abandon his home. Soon afterward, the Blackfish's nephew, Lord Edmure Tully, is coerced into ordering the Tully troops to stand down. As the Lannisters begin pouring into the castle, the Blackfish helps Brienne and Podrick escape. Jaime sees them sailing away, and he and Brienne exchange a mournful farewell.

==== Season 7 ====
Despite Brienne's failure to secure House Tully's support, the Stark loyalists are successful in ousting House Bolton, albeit only with the intervention of the Knights of the Vale and Littlefinger. Bran and Arya Stark, having heard of their House's victory, return to Winterfell. Arya spars with Brienne and takes Brienne aback when she can fight Brienne to a draw.

Sansa receives a letter inviting her to King's Landing, where Jon intends to present evidence of the White Walkers to Queen Cersei. Refusing to return to King's Landing, Sansa sends Brienne as her representative, despite Brienne's reluctance to leave Sansa unprotected from Littlefinger. In King's Landing, she is reunited with the Hound, who has survived his injuries, and tells him that Arya is safe. When Cersei refuses to aid in fighting the dead, Brienne entreats Jaime to change her mind.

==== Season 8 ====
Brienne returns to Winterfell after the parley with the Lannisters, and she is present to greet Jon and Daenerys Targaryen as they arrive with Daenerys's forces. Jaime arrives at Winterfell soon after, revealing that Cersei has no intention of sending her forces to Winterfell. Daenerys, the daughter of the Mad King, wishes to execute Jaime, but Brienne vouches for him, and Sansa overrules Daenerys. Jaime tells Brienne that he has come to fight under her command and to knight her, with Podrick, Tormund Giantsbane, Davos, and Tyrion bearing witness. With this, she becomes the first woman in Westerosi history to be knighted.

Brienne commands the forces of the Vale during the battle against the dead with Jaime and Podrick by her side and survives the battle. After the battle, Jaime and Brienne become lovers. However, after learning of Cersei's forces' attack on Daenerys's fleet, Jaime leaves Winterfell for King's Landing, which devastates Brienne. Jaime is ultimately killed during Daenerys's destruction of the Red Keep. When Jon kills Daenerys, Brienne travels to King's Landing with the Starks to determine the future of the Seven Kingdoms. Bran Stark is chosen as king, and Brienne is named commander of his Kingsguard, with Podrick also serving after being knighted. Brienne completes Jaime's entry in the White Book, commemorating the Kingsguard.

== Reception ==
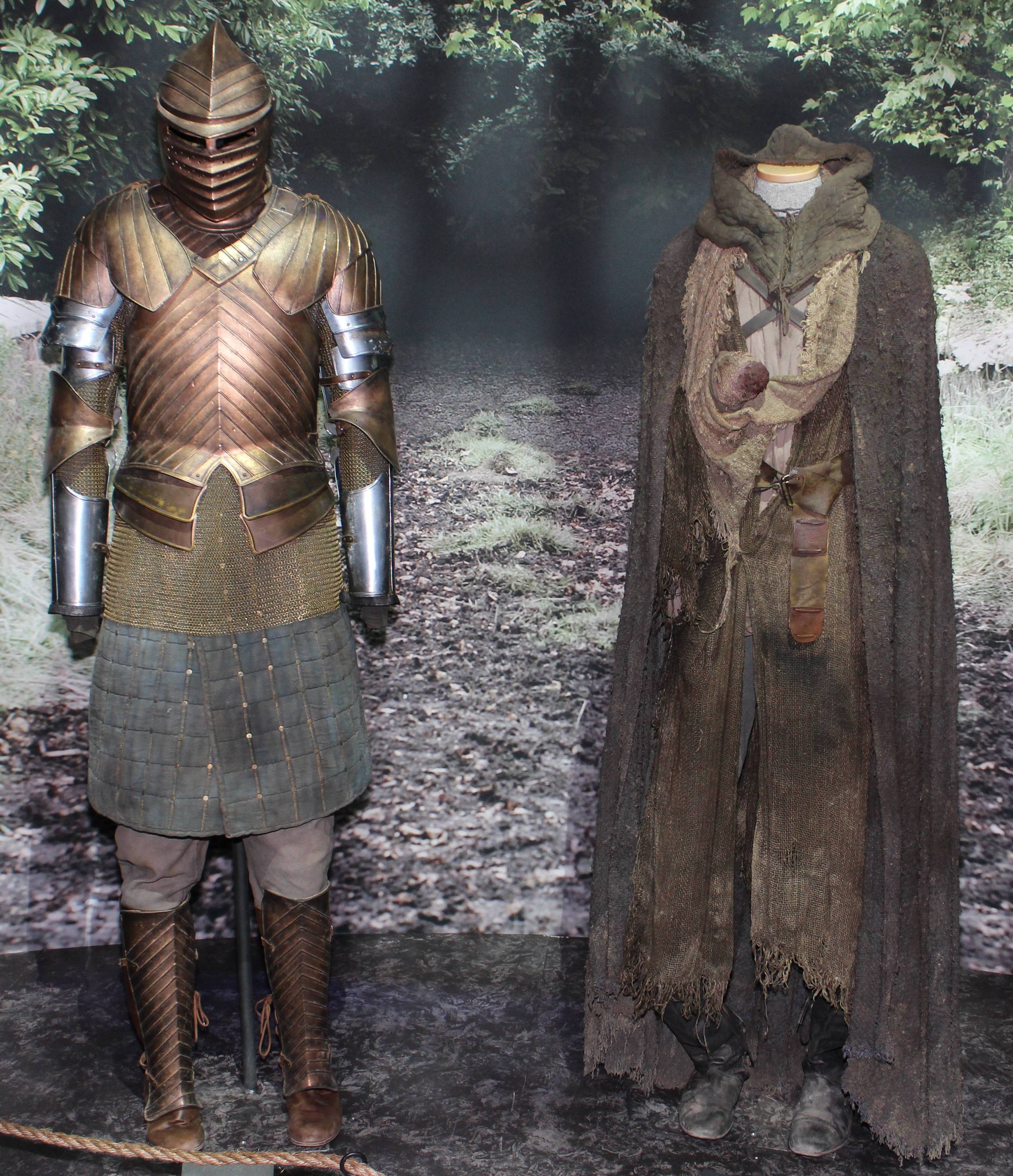
Functional weapons and armor, like Brienne of Tarth's (left), were manufactured for the series.

=== A Song of Ice and Fire ===
Brienne has proved to be a popular character with fans of the Ice and Fire series. Her popularity has led to merchandising, and HBO has released a T-shirt with Brienne's house sigil on it. Brent Hartinger writes in his essay, "A Different Kind of Other: The Role of Freaks and Outcasts in A Song of Ice and Fire", that Brienne is a disappointment, even a freak, to her family and culture. He believes her character is a well-written departure from fantasy novels where the main characters are commonly "the slender, the heterosexual, the average-heighted, the conventionally abled and traditionally gendered." Writing for witandfancy.com, Samantha Mann describes Brienne as an "awesome" character who "sticks to her belief that a knight is an honorable person who always keeps their oaths," even in a story where "good people do bad things (and vice versa)." Arthur McCulloch, writing for chamberfour.com, states that "Brienne, who while unique as a character, is never really developed. Brienne's issues and struggles remain constant. The reader merely follows her on her quest, which is an unsatisfying one at best."

=== Feminist critique ===
In her essay "Power and Feminism in Westeros," Caroline Spector describes Brienne as a woman who does not conform and who defies cultural expectations. Her character highlights the perception of women in Westeros in that her fellow warriors assume that her sex is "something to be coerced or taken, not something over which she has control... So, too, the consistent rejection Brienne endures for failing to offer the men around her a pleasing countenance." Spector also observes Brienne as a woman who has "taken for herself most of the attributes of male power," and thus provides a "stark lesson how women who dare to take male power for their own are judged and treated not only in Westeros but in all conventionally patriarchal societies."

=== Recognition and awards ===
Year	Award	Category	Result	Ref.
2014	Saturn Award	Best Supporting Actress on Television	Nominated	
2014	Screen Actors Guild Award	Outstanding Performance by an Ensemble in a Drama Series	Nominated	
2015	Screen Actors Guild Award	Outstanding Performance by an Ensemble in a Drama Series	Nominated	
2015	Empire Award	Empire Hero Award (Ensemble)	Won	
2016	Screen Actors Guild Award	Outstanding Performance by an Ensemble in a Drama Series	Nominated	
2019	Primetime Emmy Award	Outstanding Supporting Actress in a Drama Series	Nominated	
