= Onion knight =

Onion knight may refer to:

- Davos Seaworth, a character in George R. R. Martin's A Song of Ice and Fire novel series and television series Game of Thrones
- The characters Siegmeyer, Siegward and Sieglinde of Catarina in the Dark Souls games
- A job available to characters in some of the Final Fantasy games
