= Ramsay Bolton =

Character from "Game of Thrones"

- A Song of Ice and Fire character Game of Thrones character
- Iwan Rheon as Ramsay Bolton
- First appearance: Literature: A Clash of Kings (1998); Television: "Dark Wings, Dark Words" (2013); Video game: "Iron From Ice" (2014)
- Last appearance: Television: "Battle of the Bastards" (2016); Video game: "The Ice Dragon" (2015)
- Created by: George R. R. Martin
- Portrayed by: Iwan Rheon

In-universe information
- Aliases: The Bastard of Bolton; Ramsay Snow; Novels: The Bastard of the Dreadfort; Red Helm; Television: Lord Snow
- Gender: Male
- Titles: Lord of Winterfell; Castellan of the Dreadfort; Novels: Lord of the Hornwood; Television: Lord of the Dreadfort; Warden of the North; Lord Paramount of the North
- Family: House Bolton
- Spouses: Donella Hornwood; Novels: Jeyne Poole; Television: Sansa Stark
- Relatives: Roose Bolton (father); Walda Bolton (step-mother); Domeric Bolton (half-brother)

Ramsay Bolton, previously known as Ramsay Snow, is a fictional character in the A Song of Ice and Fire series of fantasy novels by American author George R. R. Martin and one of two secondary antagonists of its television adaptation, Game of Thrones, alongside Joffrey Baratheon.

Introduced in 1998's A Clash of Kings, Ramsay is a bastard son of Roose Bolton, the lord of the Dreadfort, an ancient fortress in the North of Westeros. He is subsequently mentioned in A Storm of Swords (2000) and A Feast for Crows (2005). He later appears in Martin's A Dance with Dragons (2011). Ramsay is an amoral and vicious sadist who strives to be legitimized as a true Bolton by his father. He is directly responsible for several atrocities in both the novels and television show, including the rape of Sansa Stark, the brutal torture of Theon Greyjoy, and the sacking of Winterfell; however, his role as a primary antagonist is greatly expanded in the television adaptation.

Ramsay is portrayed by Welsh actor Iwan Rheon in the HBO television adaptation. Rheon received critical acclaim for his performance, though his character's reception has been more polarized—he is widely considered to be one of the show's most brutal and hated villains.

== Character ==
Ramsay Bolton is not a point-of-view character in the novels and remains mostly in the background. His actions are witnessed and interpreted directly through the eyes of Theon Greyjoy and indirectly from stories heard by Bran Stark and Davos Seaworth.

=== Background ===
Ramsay is the product of rape. While hunting along the Weeping Water, Roose Bolton saw a miller's wife and decided to illicitly practice the banned tradition of ius primae noctis (lit. 'right of the first night'), wherein a lord had the right to bed a commoner's new bride on their wedding night. He hanged the miller under a tree for not informing his lord of his marriage to the woman and raped her beneath his swaying body. A year later, the woman arrived at the Dreadfort with the newborn Ramsay. Roose nearly killed her and the baby, but when he saw the child had his signature pale, cold eyes, the taboo of kinslaying stayed his hand. The woman claimed her husband's brother had stolen the mill and cast her out. Angered by this, Roose had the man's tongue removed so he would not tell the truth to Roose's liege lord, Rickard Stark. Roose then gave the woman the mill, a pig, several chicks, and a bag of coin every year, on the condition that she never reveal to Ramsay the truth about who his father was.

Ramsay's mother returned to the Bolton castle years later, claiming she needed help raising Ramsay, who had become wild and unruly. Roose sent Ramsay a servant named Reek. Despite frequent washes, Reek always smelled bad because of an "unknown birth condition" that made his skin smell foul, which is how he got his nickname. Giving him to Ramsay and his mother was actually a cruel joke by Roose, but Ramsay and Reek soon became inseparable. Roose would later wonder whether Ramsay had corrupted Reek or whether Reek had corrupted Ramsay, though Reek would quite faithfully follow Ramsay's orders. Ramsay once said that Reek knew better than to deny him. Despite Roose's instruction to Ramsay's mother, either she or Reek eventually told him the truth about his parentage. Roose believes that both Reek and Ramsay's mother encouraged Ramsay, constantly reminding the increasingly violent bastard of his "rights".

Roose's elder trueborn son, Domeric, tried to forge a sibling connection with his half-brother. Domeric would soon die of a mysterious sickness, and Roose believed that Ramsay poisoned him in order to rob his father of his trueborn heir. Ramsay earned the enmity of House Dustin in the process, as Lady Barbrey Dustin had been fond of her nephew, Domeric. Two years prior to the beginning of the War of the Five Kings, Roose brought Ramsay to the Dreadfort, as he had no other sons, trueborn or otherwise. There, Ramsay learned to read and write. Ramsay is accompanied by Dreadfort men called the Bastard's Boys, who are just as cruel and depraved as he is but who ultimately serve his father.

=== Appearance and personality ===
Ramsay is described as ugly and fleshy, with the sloping and big-boned body of someone who will be fat later in life. His skin is blotchy and pink, with long, brittle black hair. His two most distinctive features are his eyes—small and close-set, pale and icy like those of his father, Roose—and his mouth, consisting of two fleshy, wide lips that form a "wormy" smile. The armor he wears in battle is red and black, resembling a flayed man opening his mouth to scream. He carries a flaying knife wrought of yellow bone.

Ramsay is a vicious, savage and thoroughly unpredictable psychopath who enjoys rape, necrophilia and torture. He practises the sadistic Bolton custom of flaying his captives alive and keeps a pack of female hunting dogs that he uses to hunt down stripped-naked young women before raping and killing them; he names his dogs after women he has killed and brings back their flayed skin as a gruesome trophy. Despite this brutality, Ramsay is not unintelligent; he is a cunning and brutal tactician who is good at thinking on his feet, and a capable manipulator who pretends to be charming when he needs to. He is nonetheless described by his father as at times rash and foolish, whose violent "amusements" would make him a poor ruler in the North. Ramsay is a capable fighter but was never properly trained, and thus uses a wild and aggressive fighting style, wielding his sword "as if it were a butcher's cleaver".

== Storylines ==
=== A Clash of Kings ===
While his father is at war in A Clash of Kings, Ramsay is named castellan of the Dreadfort. After Lord Hornwood and his heir are killed fighting for Robb Stark, Ramsay forcibly marries Lady Hornwood to claim her lands before starving her to death. He escapes justice by switching places with his servant Reek, who is killed instead; Rodrik Cassel brings Ramsay, disguised as Reek, back to Winterfell, intending to have him testify to Ramsay's crimes before executing him. However, Theon Greyjoy and the Ironborn capture Winterfell and release Ramsay in exchange for a vow of service to Theon. When Theon's hostages escape, Ramsay murders two peasant boys and convinces Theon to present the corpses as those of Bran and Rickon Stark. As the Northerners move to take back Winterfell, Ramsay persuades Theon to let him ride to the Dreadfort to gather reinforcements. He returns with an army of Bolton soldiers and massacres the Northern relief force, but then proceeds to kill the Ironborn, burn Winterfell, and take Theon prisoner.

=== A Storm of Swords and A Feast for Crows ===
Before the Red Wedding, Roose Bolton presents Robb Stark with a piece of Theon's skin, revealing that Ramsay has been flaying him; though disgusted, Robb acquiesces to Theon's further captivity, as Theon's father, Balon Greyjoy, has recently died and Theon's absence presents a succession crisis for the Ironborn. Following Robb's death, Lannister king Tommen Baratheon legitimizes Ramsay as a Bolton. The Lannisters pass off Jeyne Poole as Arya Stark and send her north to be betrothed to Ramsay, with only the Lannisters and Boltons aware she is not the real Arya Stark.

=== A Dance with Dragons ===
In the dungeons of the Dreadfort, Ramsay has savagely tortured and mutilated Theon until he is so broken and in fear of Ramsay that he has adopted the identity of Reek. Ramsay coerces him to assist in lifting the Ironborn siege of Moat Cailin, subsequently reneging on his promise of safe passage to the Ironborn by having the garrison flayed. After Stannis Baratheon's capture of Deepwood Motte, Ramsay's wedding to "Arya" is moved from Barrowton to a rebuilt Winterfell. Following the wedding, Ramsay repeatedly abuses Jeyne. Shortly after the wedding, Jeyne and Theon escape with the help of Mance Rayder. Jon Snow later receives a letter, presumably from Ramsay, claiming that he has captured Mance and killed Stannis Baratheon (who was besieging Winterfell), threatening to destroy the Night's Watch if Jon does not deliver Theon, Jeyne, and several other members of Stannis's court to Ramsay as captives. Finally pushed to his breaking point, Jon instead decides that he will seek out and kill Ramsay himself, though his own men stab him before he can leave Castle Black.

=== The Winds of Winter ===
A released sample chapter reveals that Stannis is alive and preparing to fight Roose and Ramsay, though it is unclear whether the chapter occurs before or after Ramsay sends his letter. Theon, now a prisoner of Stannis, warns him not to underestimate Ramsay or even call him "Ramsay Snow," but Stannis, who is not afraid of Ramsay, ignores Theon's warnings.

=== Family tree of House Bolton ===
Bethany; Ryswell		Roose	"Fat" Walda; Frey
Domeric	Donella; Hornwood	Ramsay	Jeyne; Poole (Note: Ramsay marries Sansa Stark in the television adaptation Game of Thrones.)

== TV adaptation ==
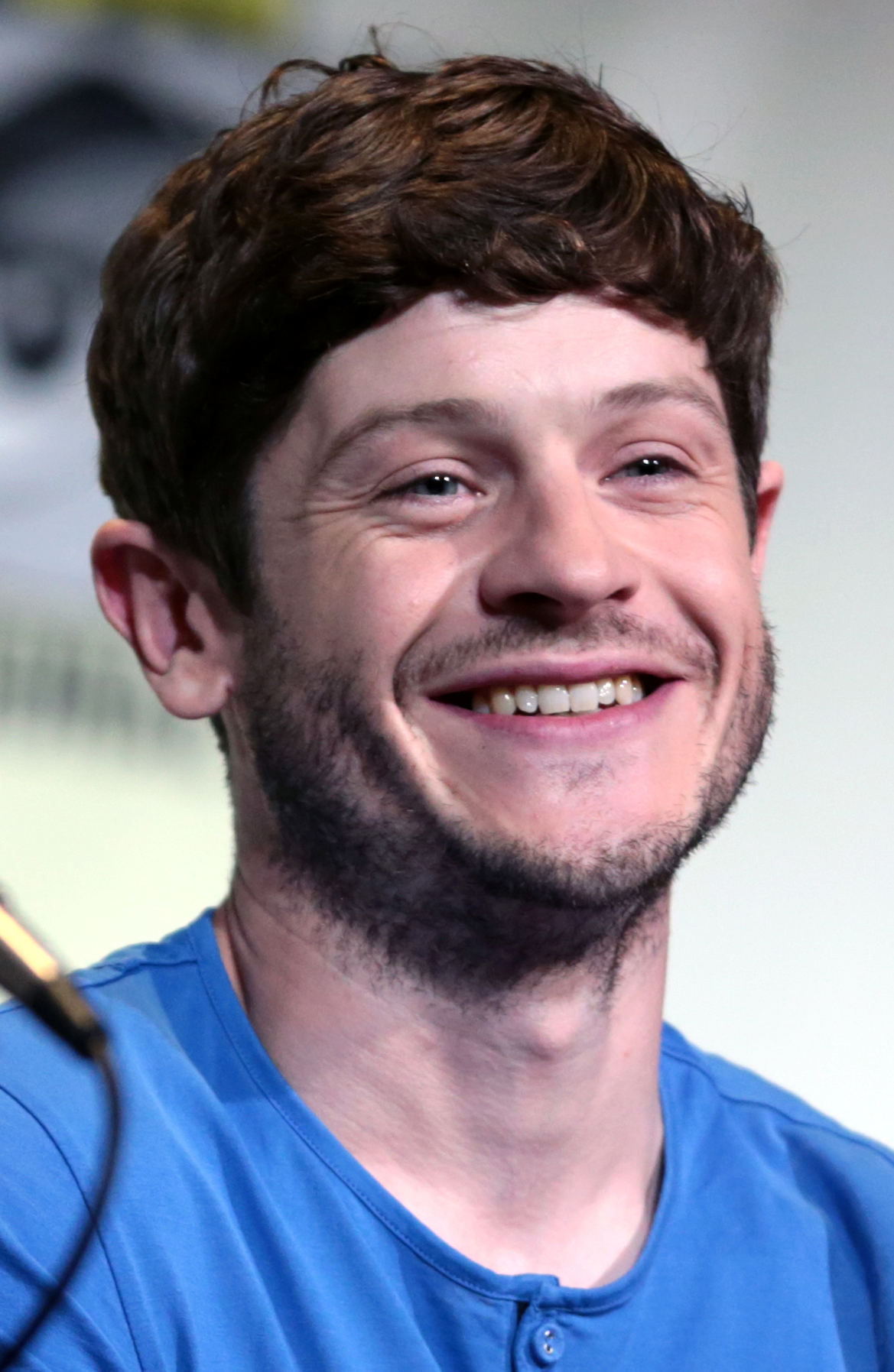
Iwan Rheon played the role of Ramsay Bolton in the television series.

Ramsay Bolton was portrayed by Welsh actor Iwan Rheon in the HBO television adaptation of the series of books, receiving critical acclaim for his performance. Rheon had previously auditioned for the role of Jon Snow, which he lost to Kit Harington. Ramsay is first mentioned in the show's second season and first appears onscreen in the third, though Rheon is credited as "Boy" until his true identity is revealed in the third-season finale, "Mhysa".

The circumstances of Ramsay's conception and acknowledgment do not change in the show, though Ramsay's childhood is never examined. His mother died when he was young, but she did raise him initially, just like in the books. When he is torturing Theon Greyjoy, Ramsay recounts, "My mother taught me not to throw stones at cripples. But my father taught me to aim for their head!" He also recounts how, at the age of eleven, he first encountered the Dreadfort kennelmaster's daughter, Myranda, and was drawn to her fearlessness, eventually taking her as his mistress. He tells her he plans to marry her, but after his legitimization, he dismisses those promises. Ramsay's dogs are Presa Canarios, a Spanish mastiff breed.

=== Season 2 ===
After Theon Greyjoy and his forces capture Winterfell, Roose Bolton offers Robb Stark the chance to have Ramsay and the men left at the Dreadfort lift the occupation. Robb agrees, with orders to spare the Ironborn if they surrender, but to bring Theon to Robb alive. The Ironborn subdue Theon and present him to Ramsay, who takes Theon prisoner, but Ramsay then proceeds to sack Winterfell and flay the Ironborn garrison for his own amusement.

=== Season 3 ===
Ramsay sends word to the Stark forces at Harrenhal claiming that the Ironborn sacked Winterfell and fled before the Bolton forces arrived. In the Dreadfort dungeons, Ramsay's men torture Theon while Ramsay watches on in the guise of a cleaning boy. Claiming to be a servant of Theon's sister Yara, he sets Theon free before sending his men after Theon, only to follow and kill them when they recapture Theon. Theon confesses that during his conquest of Winterfell he used two farmers' boys to fake the murders of Bran and Rickon Stark, as Ramsay pretends to lead Theon to Deepwood Motte, the castle Yara holds. In reality, Ramsay leads Theon in a circle back to the dungeon and imprisons him again, tormenting him with the revelation that he was the architect of his suffering all along.

Ramsay begins to torture Theon by flaying his finger until Theon begs him to cut it off. After severing Theon's pinky, he has Myranda and another servant seduce him; however, this is only intended to taunt Theon before Ramsay severs his genitals. He sends Theon's penis to his father, Balon, threatening to mutilate him further and to flay the other Ironborn invaders unless they flee the North; Balon refuses, as he now has no use for Theon. Theon begs Ramsay to kill him, but Ramsay states that Theon is more useful alive. Noting Theon's stench, he dubs him "Reek" and beats him until he responds to his new name.

=== Season 4 ===
When Roose Bolton returns to the Dreadfort, he reprimands Ramsay for having overstepped his boundaries as castellan by mutilating a valuable hostage and sending terms of surrender to the Greyjoys. Infuriated, Ramsay demonstrates his brainwashing of Reek by having him reveal that Bran and Rickon Stark are still alive, and having Reek shave him without harming him, even after revealing Roose's murder of Robb Stark. Impressed, Roose orders Ramsay and Reek to lift the Ironborn occupation of Moat Cailin. Yara and her men infiltrate the Dreadfort and try to rescue Theon, but he refuses to go with her, fearing another of Ramsay's tricks, and Ramsay chases the Greyjoy soldiers away with his hounds. Pleased with Reek's loyalty, Ramsay has him pose as Theon to convince the Ironborn holding Moat Cailin to surrender, with the promise of safe passage, though Ramsay reneges on his word and flays the entire garrison. As a reward for his success, Ramsay is legitimized as a Bolton. He then accompanies the rest of House Bolton in moving to Winterfell.

=== Season 5 ===
Ramsay draws the ire of Roose after flaying the family of a Northern lord who refuses to pledge fealty. To placate the other Northern houses and to solidify the Boltons' hold on the North, Ramsay is betrothed to Sansa Stark, publicly believed to be the last living Stark. Although he initially feigns kindness to Sansa, after Myranda shows her Reek in the kennels, Ramsay uses Sansa's contempt for Reek as psychological torment by having him apologize for "killing" Bran and Rickon, having him give Sansa away at the wedding, and ultimately forcing Reek to watch as he rapes Sansa on their wedding night. When Sansa begs Reek to signal for help, Reek instead warns Ramsay, who flays a maid who had tried to help Sansa.

With Stannis Baratheon's forces camped and ready to march on Winterfell, Ramsay persuades Roose to let him and twenty men infiltrate his camp and destroy his supplies. The plan succeeds, ultimately causing most of Stannis' army to desert him. The remnants of the Baratheon army march on Winterfell, but the Bolton cavalry, led by Ramsay, defeat them with ease and Stannis is slain. In the chaos of the battle, however, Theon kills Myranda and flees with Sansa.

=== Season 6 ===
After mourning Myranda, Roose warns Ramsay that he faces disinheritance if Sansa is not recovered and Roose's unborn child is a son. Ramsay's best hunters locate Sansa and Theon but are intercepted and killed by Brienne of Tarth. After Roose's wife, Walda, gives birth to a boy, Ramsay promptly murders his father and has his hounds maul Walda and his newborn half-brother to death, securing his position as Lord of Winterfell and Warden of the North.

Ramsay is approached by Smalljon Umber, who asks for his help in defending the North against the wildlings Jon Snow has offered refuge to at the Wall. To secure their alliance, Smalljon presents Ramsay with Osha and Rickon Stark, who were previously under the protection of Smalljon's now-deceased father, the Greatjon. Ramsay kills Osha when she tries to assassinate him, and throws Rickon in Winterfell's dungeons. He then sends a letter to Jon Snow at Castle Black, threatening to exterminate the wildlings and have Rickon and Jon killed if Sansa is not returned to him.

Jon Snow responds by leading an army of wildlings and assorted Stark loyalists on a march towards Winterfell. As the Stark and Bolton armies prepare for battle, Jon and Ramsay parley, during which Jon offers to settle their differences with one-on-one combat, and Ramsay offers Jon surrender terms, but both refuse. On the day of the battle, Ramsay releases Rickon and tells him to run to his half-brother before killing him with an arrow. With Jon having charged out in a futile attempt to save Rickon, his forces follow behind and are drawn out of their position. The Bolton phalanx quickly surrounds the Starks, but the Knights of the Vale arrive and overwhelm the Boltons. Ramsay flees to Winterfell and kills the giant Wun Wun when he breaches Winterfell's gate. With his men slain, Ramsay finally accepts Jon's offer of one-on-one combat, but is quickly overpowered by Jon, who brutally beats him and orders him locked in the kennels as a prisoner. That night, Ramsay is visited by Sansa, who watches as his hungry hounds eat Ramsay alive. Ramsay's death marks the end of House Bolton and its rule in the North.

=== Reception and awards ===
In 2016, The New York Times referred to the character as "arguably the most hated man on television" and "the signature Game of Thrones villain", replacing Joffrey Baratheon.

Year	Award	Category	Result	Ref.
2014	Screen Actors Guild Award	Outstanding Performance by an Ensemble in a Drama Series	Nominated	
2015	IGN Awards	Best TV Villain	Nominated	
2015	IGN People's Choice Award	Best TV Villain	Nominated	
2016	Screen Actors Guild Award	Outstanding Performance by an Ensemble in a Drama Series	Nominated	
