= A Dance with Dragons =

Novel by George R. R. Martin

- Author: George R. R. Martin
- Audio read by: Roy Dotrice
- Cover artist: Larry Rostant
- Language: English
- Series: A Song of Ice and Fire
- Release number: 5
- Genre: Fantasy
- Published: July 12, 2011
- Publisher: Voyager Books (UK); Bantam Spectra (US)
- Publication place: United States
- Media type: Print (hardback & paperback)
- Pages: 1056 (US hardcover)
- Award: Locus Award for Best Fantasy Novel (2012)
- ISBN: 978-0553801477; 9780007456376 (UK hardback)
- OCLC: 191922936
- Dewey Decimal: 813/.54
- LC Class: PS3563.A7239 D36 2011
- Preceded by: A Feast for Crows
- Followed by: The Winds of Winter (planned)

A Dance with Dragons is the fifth novel of seven planned in the epic fantasy series A Song of Ice and Fire by American author George R. R. Martin. In some countries, the paperback edition was published in two parts: Dreams and Dust and After the Feast. It was the only novel in the series to be published during the eight-season run of the HBO adaptation of the series, Game of Thrones. It is 1,056 pages long and has a word count of almost 415,000.

The US hardcover was officially published on July 12, 2011, and a few weeks later, it went to No. 1 on Publishers Weekly and USA Today bestsellers lists. The novel was adapted, along with A Feast for Crows, for television as the fifth season of Game of Thrones, although elements of the book have also appeared in the series' third, fourth, and sixth seasons.

== Plot summary ==
=== The Wall and beyond ===
Stannis Baratheon, a claimant to the Iron Throne of Westeros, occupies the Wall at the realm's northern border, having repelled an invasion of wildlings from the northern wilderness. He executes who he believes to be Mance Rayder, the leader of the wildlings, for refusing to submit to him and marches his army south to seek support in his bid for the throne.

Jon Snow, the newly elected Lord Commander of the Night's Watch, which defends the Wall, prepares the defense of the realm against the Others, a hostile race of inhuman creatures from the far north. Jon negotiates with the wildling leader Tormund Giantsbane to let Tormund's men pass in exchange for their assistance. This results in a fragile peace and creates unrest among the Watch, as they have long considered the wildlings their enemies.

Jon receives word that his half-sister, Arya Stark, is to be married to their family's enemy Ramsay Bolton, while Stannis's advisor, the sorceress Melisandre, warns that she is in danger. Mance, thanks to Melisandre's magic, is alive, and he is sent to the Starks' ancestral castle, Winterfell, now occupied by the Boltons, to rescue Arya. However, the girl in Melisandre's visions turns out to be Alys Karstark, a young noblewoman fleeing to escape her treacherous uncle. To protect Alys and integrate the wildlings into Westerosi society, Jon arranges for Alys to marry Sigorn of Thenn, a wildling leader.

Jon receives a taunting letter, seemingly authored by Ramsay Bolton, who claims to have crushed Stannis's army at Winterfell. Threatening an attack, Ramsay demands that Jon send him Stannis's wife, daughter, and other hostages, in addition to Arya and Jon's foster-brother, Theon Greyjoy, the latter two of whom Jon has not seen in years. Jon decides to march on Ramsay himself and asks for volunteers to accompany him. His officers view Jon's intent to march on Ramsay as a betrayal of the Watch's neutrality, and he is stabbed in a mutiny.

Meanwhile, Jon's quadriplegic half-brother, Bran Stark, traveling north of the Wall, is led to the last surviving Children of the Forest, the non-human natives of Westeros. They introduce Bran and his companions to the "last greenseer", a man intertwined with the roots of a weirwood tree (hinted to be Brynden Rivers, a character introduced in the Tales of Dunk and Egg). He helps Bran learn clairvoyant "greensight", enabling Bran to witness the past and present through the eyes of the weirwood trees that grow throughout the North.

=== Across the Narrow Sea ===
==== In the Free Cities ====
Having killed his father Tywin, the Hand of the King, the dwarf Tyrion Lannister is smuggled out of Westeros to the city of Pentos by the spymaster Varys, where he is sheltered by the merchant Illyrio Mopatis. Tyrion is sent south with a party ostensibly to aid the exiled princess Daenerys Targaryen, who controls the only living dragons, in claiming the Iron Throne. Tyrion learns that Varys and Illyrio have hidden the presumed-dead Aegon VI Targaryen, son of Daenerys's late brother Prince Rhaegar Targaryen, and intend to install him as the king of Westeros with Daenerys's aid. Tyrion persuades Aegon to invade Westeros immediately, without waiting for Daenerys. Soon afterward, Tyrion is kidnapped by Daenerys's disgraced advisor, Jorah Mormont, who intends to deliver him to Daenerys in order to regain her favor.

In the Free City of Braavos, Arya is an acolyte of the guild of assassins known as the Faceless Men. When they temporarily afflict her with blindness, Arya develops her sense of hearing and realizes that she can "see" through the eyes of cats the same way she could with her pet direwolf, Nymeria. After her sight is restored, Arya is tasked with assassinating a corrupt merchant while magically disguised with another girl's face. After doing so, Arya is declared an apprentice of the Faceless Men, to be sent to another assassin to continue her training.

==== Slaver's Bay ====
Daenerys has conquered the city of Meereen and banned slavery, but struggles to maintain peace among various factions within the city, including the Sons of the Harpy, a violent Meereenese resistance group, and the neighboring city of Yunkai.

Daenerys's dragons have become increasingly dangerous, and she reluctantly confines them in a dungeon for the safety of her people. Drogon, the largest, evades capture and flies off. Despite her sexual relationship with the mercenary Daario Naharis, Daenerys marries the Meereenese nobleman Hizdahr zo Loraq to secure an alliance to appease the Sons of the Harpy.

Quentyn Martell, the son of the prince of Dorne in southern Westeros, arrives in Meereen in hopes of renewing the alliance between Daenerys's family and his, but he is unable to maintain her attention. Jorah and Tyrion are shipwrecked, kidnapped, and sold to a Yunkish slave trader. They escape from the Yunkish army besieging Meereen and join the Second Sons mercenary group, with Tyrion intending to secure their support for Daenerys. Meanwhile, another Westerosi, Victarion Greyjoy, sails for Meereen, intending to marry Daenerys and use her dragons to overthrow his brother, the king of the Ironborn.

At Hizdahr's insistence, Daenerys reopens the city's "fighting pits" for gladiatorial combat, but the noise and carnage attract Drogon. In the resulting chaos, Daenerys climbs onto Drogon to calm him, but he flies away with her. Hizdahr is implicated in an attempt to poison Daenerys. Her advisor, Barristan Selmy, takes part in a plot to remove Hizdahr from power, and the Sons of the Harpy resume their killing. Barristan prepares for battle with the armies outside Meereen. Quentyn attempts to prove his worth by riding one of the remaining dragons but is killed, and both dragons are released.

Drogon flies Daenerys to the Dothraki Sea, the grassland controlled by the nomadic Dothraki people. After several days, Daenerys encounters a Dothraki horde led by Khal Jhaqo.

=== In the Seven Kingdoms ===
==== The North ====
In the North, Roose Bolton has overthrown House Stark and assumed authority as the Warden of the North after allying with House Frey. Much of the region is occupied by Ironborn invaders. Following Jon Snow's advice, Stannis wins the support of Northern mountain clans by pledging to recapture Winterfell and fighting off the Ironborn. With their support, Stannis captures Asha Greyjoy, Victarion's niece, and marches his forces toward Winterfell to attack the Boltons, but his advance is halted by heavy snowstorms.

Stannis's advisor, Davos Seaworth, is sent to win the support of the wealthy lord Wyman Manderly, who pretends to execute Davos to curry favor with the Lannister regime that controls the Iron Throne. In a secret meeting, Manderly tells Davos that he and other Northern vassals intend to feign submission to the Boltons and Lannisters while plotting the restoration of Stark rule and revenge for Robb Stark's death. Revealing to Davos that young Rickon Stark is in hiding on the remote island of Skagos, Manderly pledges to support Stannis if Davos can retrieve Rickon and unite the Starks' supporters around him.

Theon Greyjoy is a prisoner of the Boltons and is mutilated and tortured by Roose's sadistic son Ramsay, who renames Theon "Reek". To cement his rule over the North, Roose has Ramsay supposedly married to Arya Stark, but the girl is actually Jeyne Poole, a friend of Arya's sister, Sansa; Jeyne is forced to impersonate Arya and is physically and sexually tormented by Ramsay. Disguised, Mance Rayder arrives at Winterfell and enlists Theon to help him free the false Arya. Meanwhile, tensions are high in Winterfell, with Manderly suspected of murdering three Freys who came to White Harbor, and other deaths happening around Winterfell. Theon and Jeyne escape, leaping from the castle wall into the snow to be captured by Stannis's forces.

==== The South ====
Jaime Lannister, the uncle (and, secretly, father) of the young king Tommen Baratheon, negotiates the surrender of the last of the late Robb Stark's allies, nominally putting an end to the Stark–Lannister war in the Riverlands. Brienne of Tarth, whom Jaime had sent to search for Sansa Stark, finds Jaime and tells him Sansa is in danger; he follows after her.

After Tyrion convinces Aegon to attack Westeros, Aegon and his forces capture several castles in the Stormlands with little resistance. Meanwhile, Aegon's foster father, Jon Connington, is secretly succumbing to greyscale, a deadly and contagious disease.

Doran Martell, the prince of Dorne, sends two of his nieces north to the capital city of King's Landing to infiltrate the Faith and the government and work in Dorne's interests.

Cersei Lannister, Tommen's mother and queen regent, has been arrested by the Faith on charges of fornication and conspiracy. To gain release from her imprisonment, she confesses to several of the lesser charges against her, but does not confess to having murdered her husband, King Robert Baratheon, nor that her children are the product of incest. As a condition of her release, Cersei is forced to humiliate herself by walking naked across the city. Meanwhile, Cersei's ally, the ex-maester Qyburn, has created "Ser Robert Strong", an eight-foot-tall figure encased in armor, to be an unbeatable champion in Cersei's upcoming trial by combat.

Having taken control of the government, Cersei's uncle, Kevan Lannister, and Grand Maester Pycelle attempt to undo the damage caused by Cersei's misrule. However, Varys reappears and fatally wounds both Kevan and Pycelle, revealing that he has been plotting for years for the Lannisters to destroy themselves so that Aegon Targaryen can take the throne, having been raised to be an ideal ruler. The book ends with Varys sending his child spies to finish Kevan off.

=== Extras ===
In addition to the maps published in previous books, the book includes a new map of the previously unmapped area of the Free Cities on the eastern continent. Like the previous four volumes in the Ice and Fire series, the book includes an appendix with a complete list of characters.

== Characters ==
The story is narrated from the point of view of 18 different characters, including two minor one-off point-of-view (POV) characters featured in the prologue and epilogue. All but two POV characters were identified before the book's release.

In the North:

- Prologue: Varamyr Sixskins, a skinchanger and one of the surviving wildlings north of the Wall.
- Jon Snow, the 998th Lord Commander of the Night's Watch and bastard son of Eddard Stark.
- Bran Stark, rightful heir to his brother, the late Robb Stark. Seeking an old power beyond the Wall, believed dead by his own family.
- Davos Seaworth, former smuggler and Hand of the King to Stannis Baratheon. Has recently learned to read, sent to negotiate with northern houses.
- Reek, the Prince of Winterfell, the Turncloak, a Ghost in Winterfell: Theon Greyjoy, presumed-dead son of recently deceased King Balon Greyjoy of the Iron Islands, a captive of Ramsay Bolton and now tortured, starved and barely sane.
- The Wayward Bride, the King's Prize, the Sacrifice: Asha Greyjoy, niece of King Euron Greyjoy of the Iron Islands, fled the Iron Islands after her uncle's coronation.
- Lady Melisandre, a shadow-binder from Asshai and a devoted priestess to the red god R'hllor, advisor to Stannis.

In the eastern continent of Essos:

- Daenerys Targaryen, heir to the Targaryen dynasty which ruled Westeros for 300 years until their deposition 15 years before the first novel. Self-proclaimed Queen of Westeros, she now rules the city of Meereen.
- Tyrion Lannister, dwarf and uncle to the King Tommen of Westeros, a fugitive wanted for kinslaying and regicide. Recently fled the Seven Kingdoms.
- The Merchant's Man, the Windblown, the Spurned Suitor, the Dragontamer: Quentyn Martell, eldest son of Prince Doran Martell of Dorne, traveling into the East on a mission for his father.
- The Lost Lord, the Griffin Reborn: Jon Connington, one of the former Hands of the King to Aerys Targaryen and one of Prince Rhaegar's closest friends. Exiled, and falsely believed dead. His identity as a narrator was kept secret throughout the book's pre-release process.
- The Queensguard, the Discarded Knight, the Kingbreaker, the Queen's Hand: Ser Barristan Selmy, the former Lord Commander of Robert Baratheon's Kingsguard, and the first of Daenerys's Queensguard.
- The Iron Suitor: Victarion Greyjoy, Captain of the Iron fleet, recently gone on a quest to find Daenerys and use her for the Ironborn's own ends.
- The Blind Girl, the Ugly Little Girl: Arya Stark, hiding in the Free City of Braavos, where she has taken on the identity of the "Cat of the Canals" and continues her training as an assassin by the House of Black and White (The Faceless Men).

In the South:

- The Watcher: Areo Hotah, Captain of Doran Martell's guard.
- Ser Jaime Lannister, the Kingslayer, Lord Commander of the Kingsguard; currently occupying the lands around Riverrun.
- Cersei Lannister, the Queen Regent, currently imprisoned in a tower cell, awaiting trial.
- Epilogue: Ser Kevan Lannister, head of House Lannister in light of his brother's death, and current regent to King Tommen. His identity as a narrator was kept secret throughout the book's pre-release process.

Chapters for several POVs, which may include Sansa Stark, Samwell Tarly, Aeron Damphair, Arianne Martell, and Brienne of Tarth were written for the book, but they will instead tentatively appear in the next book, The Winds of Winter.

== Writing ==
=== Early development ===
A Dance with Dragons was originally intended to be the title of the second novel in the sequence, when Martin still envisioned the series as a trilogy. Some early US editions of A Game of Thrones (1996) list A Dance of Dragons as the forthcoming second volume in the series. The 1998 anthology Legends, which features the novella The Hedge Knight from the same universe, listed A Dance of Dragons as the third installment of a four-book series.

Due to the size of the still-unfinished manuscript for A Feast for Crows, Martin and his publishers split the narrative into two books. Rather than divide the text in half chronologically, Martin instead split the material by character and location, resulting in "two novels taking place simultaneously" with different casts of characters. Published in 2005, A Feast for Crows is narrated primarily by characters in the South of the Seven Kingdoms and in the new locations of the Iron Islands and Dorne. A Dance with Dragons covers characters in the North and across the narrow sea, although Jaime Lannister, Cersei Lannister, Arya Stark, Areo Hotah and Victarion and Asha Greyjoy appear in both volumes.

Approximately one-third of the published A Dance with Dragons consists of material that had been written for the pre-split A Feast for Crows, although much of this has been rewritten by Martin.

In 2009, Martin confirmed that, contrary to earlier statements, Sansa Stark would not appear in A Dance with Dragons; Sansa chapters initially slated for the novel have instead been pushed back to The Winds of Winter, which is planned to be the sixth book in the series. In early 2010, Martin noted that his intent for A Dance with Dragons was for the first 800 manuscript pages to cover the alternate characters in the same time span as A Feast for Crows, and that "Everything that follows is post-Feast, so that's where some of the cast from the last book start popping up again." Stating that "I wanted to resolve at least a few of the cliffhangers from Feast," Martin also mentioned the possibility that some of his finished chapters might get pushed to the next novel, The Winds of Winter, depending on the length of the finished manuscript for A Dance with Dragons.

=== Road to publication ===
Martin supplied a note at the end of A Feast for Crows explaining the reason for the split and promising that A Dance with Dragons would follow with the missing POV characters 'next year'. Despite these original, optimistic predictions of possible completion in late 2006, Martin completed the novel in April 2011, nearly five years later. During this period, Martin's blog featured sporadic updates on his progress, and in January 2008 he posted an update affirming his vigilant commitment to finishing the novel. In early 2008, publisher Spectra Books stated that A Dance with Dragons would be released on September 30, 2008, but Martin stated this would only be possible if he finished writing by the end of June, before his trip to Spain and Portugal, a goal which he did not meet.

On February 19, 2009, Martin posted on his website: "I am trying to finish the book by June. I think I can do that. If I do, A Dance with Dragons will likely be published in September or October." On June 22, 2009, the author expressed "guarded optimism" with respect to his progress on the novel, while still not confirming a publication date. When asked in a July 2009 interview with FREE! Magazine how the book was going, Martin stated, "It is going pretty well, actually. I am hoping to finish it by September or October; that is my goal." On October 6, 2009, Martin said that his working manuscript for A Dance with Dragons had just exceeded 1,100 pages of completed chapters, plus "considerably more in partials, fragments, and roughs." He noted that this made the upcoming novel longer than his earlier books A Game of Thrones and A Feast for Crows.

On March 2, 2010, Martin remarked that he had reached 1,311 manuscript pages, making A Dance with Dragons the second-longest novel in the series at that point, behind only the 1,521-page manuscript of A Storm of Swords. On July 8, 2010, Martin spoke at a conference and confirmed the then current length of the book to be 1,400 manuscript pages. He expressed his disappointment that he was unable to completely finish the novel by the conference, although he would not speculate how soon the book would be completed after his return home on July 11. At the same conference, Martin also confirmed that he has written one Sansa, one Arya, and two Arianne chapters for the planned sixth novel, Winds of Winter, and had transferred two Cersei chapters from that book into A Dance with Dragons. On August 7, 2010, Martin confirmed that he had completed eight POVs, excluding the prologue and epilogue.

At the New York Comic Con on October 10, 2010, Spectra senior editor Anne Groell revealed that Martin had only five chapters remaining to finish, with sections of the chapters already completed. She stated her desire to have the manuscript completed by December. In a December 2010 interview with Bear Swarm, Martin stated that he almost had A Dance With Dragons completed.

On March 3, 2011, the release of the novel, though at that point still not completed, was set for July 12. Martin claimed this July 2011 publication date was different from the previous publication dates mentioned, in that this was "real", as opposed to earlier "wishful thinking, boundless optimism, cockeyed dreams, [and] honest mistakes". By April 27, 2011, A Dance with Dragons was completed save for incorporating requested changes made by his book editor and her staff copy-editors, suggested final draft notes from trusted friends and a line-by-line reread done to tighten and eliminate any unnecessary "fat" remaining in the manuscript. While the unfinished manuscript exceeded 1,600 pages, making it the longest volume in the series, the final draft was reduced to 1,510 pages, making A Dance of Dragons, by narrow margin, shorter than A Storm of Swords and thus the series' second-longest novel.

As scheduled, the novel was released on July 12, 2011, though on June 29, 2011, Amazon Germany mistakenly released 180 copies of the novel early. Martin requested that those who held copies not spoil the book for fans who had to wait. Several Song of Ice and Fire websites put an embargo in place on their forums with the same intent.

== Reception ==
=== Critical response ===
The Atlantic's Rachael Brown found A Dance with Dragons "infinitely more satisfying than its predecessor, 2005's bleak and plodding A Feast for Crows. The aspects of Martin's work that have endeared him to fans are abundant here – rich world building, narrative twists and turns, and gritty depictions of the human struggle for power. Characters who were sorely missed in Feast – Daenerys Targaryen, Tyrion Lannister, and Jon Snow – make up more than a third of the novel, and Martin is wise enough to give us at least a chapter from (almost) everyone else. Weaknesses that have plagued Martin's previous books are also present: too much repetition, unexceptional prose, and characters who use the same idioms (and have sex in exactly the same manner) no matter their ethnicity, social class, or continent. But while A Dance with Dragons cries out for better editing, it remains entirely engrossing. Martin has hidden so many clues and red herrings throughout his previous volumes that it is a thrill to see certain pieces fall into place."

Remy Verhoeve of The Huffington Post said, "A Dance with Dragons is just a book, of course. It is not the Second Coming or anything. And I understand that the author must feel a lot of pressure concerning this one (he should). It's late and it has to repair some of the damage done by A Feast for Crows, which frankly felt as if it was written by a ghost writer at times. Finally it is here, and some of the things we've been wondering about for more than a decade are actually revealed (not everything, but at least some things). It has the same structural problems as the previous book; it is sprawling and incoherent at times, but at least the characters are more interesting than in the previous installment. It does feel like I'm reading a bunch of separate stories within the same setting–the chapters are told through the eyes of various characters–but that doesn't really bother me as I love the setting and like to see it through various points of view. Theories that have been bandied about online for the last ten years mostly come true in this book, so in that respect the novel isn't shocking but neither is it disappointing. Martin also manages to put in a few twists, but ends the book much like he did the previous one with cliffhangers instead of wrapping things up a little better so the next long wait won't hurt so much."

David Orr of The New York Times said, "A Dance With Dragons comes in at roughly 9,574,622,012 pages, and smart money says the final two books in the series will make this one look like 'The Old Man and the Sea'. Such length isn't necessary, and it hurts Martin's prose and his plot mechanics. Tyrion 'waddles' at least 12 times here, and even if we suppose the unflattering word reflects Tyrion's contempt for his own awkward gait, it seems unlikely he would indulge this contempt when he's, say, fighting for his life. Similarly, when your novel's terrain stretches across hundreds of miles and your world lacks jet propulsion, as an author you face some basic problems of transportation that can result in conveyance via Rube Goldberg," but also wrote that "Still, 'A Dance With Dragons' is relentlessly entertaining."

Time's James Poniewozik found a possible "weakness to the early Meereen sections [by] marking time (and making Dany uncharacteristically indecisive) to allow time for all the pieces to fall into place" and said, "All this makes for a thousand-page book that feels half as long, that moves dextrously, answers key questions and gobsmacks you with convincing feints and change-ups. As in AFFC, there are sections that feel like they could have used an editor. In some chapters you suddenly find yourself in a strange land with a character you have little attachment to, wondering where this thread is going, as if you had stayed too long at a party after the friends you came with have left.

The Washington Post's Bill Sheehan said, "Filled with vividly rendered set pieces, unexpected turnings, assorted cliffhangers and moments of appalling cruelty, A Dance With Dragons is epic fantasy as it should be written: passionate, compelling, convincingly detailed and thoroughly imagined. Despite a number of overtly fantastic elements (dragons, seers, shape shifters and sorcerers), the book—and the series as a whole—feels grounded in the brutal reality of medieval times and has more in common with the Wars of the Roses than it does with The Lord of the Rings. The result is a complex summer blockbuster with brains and heart, a book with rare—and potentially enormous—appeal.

Megan Wasson of The Christian Science Monitor said, "A Dance with Dragons may well be one of the best books in the five-book series so far. Martin's prose is concise but pithy, begging to be devoured over and over again. All the fans' favorite characters make an appearance, unlike in the last book. But what truly sets this book above some of the others in the series is Martin's ability to keep his readers on their toes and the edges of their seats. No character, no matter how likeable and seemingly important, is ever safe from Martin's pen (remember Ned Stark?), and on the other hand, no one can ever be truly pronounced dead. What you thought was going to happen after reading Books No. 1, 2, and even 3 and 4, now clearly will not happen, and that's where Martin's strength lies."

=== Awards ===
In April 2012, A Dance with Dragons was nominated for the 2012 Hugo Award for Best Novel. In May 2012, it was nominated for the 2012 Locus Award for Best Fantasy Novel and won it in June 2012. In August 2012, the novel was nominated for a World Fantasy Award for Best Novel.
