= Bran Stark =

Character in A Song of Ice and Fire

- A Song of Ice and Fire character Game of Thrones character
- Isaac Hempstead Wright as Brandon Stark
- First appearance: Literature: A Game of Thrones (1996); Television: "Winter Is Coming" (2011)
- Last appearance: Television: "The Iron Throne" (2019)
- Created by: George R. R. Martin
- Adapted by: D.B. Weiss & David Benioff (Game of Thrones)
- Portrayed by: Isaac Hempstead Wright

In-universe information
- Aliases: Novels: The Winged Wolf; Television: Little Lord; Three-Eyed Raven; Bran the Broken
- Gender: Male
- Titles: Prince of Winterfell; Television: King of the Andals and the First Men; Lord of the Six Kingdoms; Protector of the Realm
- Family: House Stark
- Relatives: Eddard Stark (father); Catelyn Tully (mother); Robb Stark (brother); Sansa Stark (sister); Arya Stark (sister); Rickon Stark (brother); Theon Greyjoy (foster brother); Rickard Stark (grandfather); Lyarra Stark (grandmother); Brandon Stark (uncle); Lyanna Stark (aunt); Benjen Stark (uncle); Hoster Tully (grandfather); Minisa Whent (grandmother); Lysa Tully (aunt); Edmure Tully (uncle); Brynden Tully (granduncle); Robert Arryn (cousin); Novels: Jon Snow (half-brother); Television: Jon Snow (cousin/adoptive brother)
- Origin: Winterfell, The North

Brandon Stark, also known as Bran, is a fictional character in the A Song of Ice and Fire series of epic fantasy novels by American author George R. R. Martin, and its television adaptation, Game of Thrones, in which he is portrayed by English actor Isaac Hempstead Wright in every season except the fifth. Introduced in 1996's A Game of Thrones, Bran subsequently appears in A Clash of Kings (1998) and A Storm of Swords (2000). He is one of a few prominent characters not included in the fourth novel, A Feast for Crows (2005), but returns in the fifth novel, A Dance with Dragons (2011).

Bran is the second son and fourth child of Lord Eddard and Lady Catelyn Stark of Winterfell, the ancient capital of the Northern kingdom in Westeros. Bran dreams of becoming a knight since childhood but is rendered paraplegic by Jaime Lannister in the first novel after stumbling upon the latter's affair with twin sister Cersei Lannister. Awaking from a months-long coma, he is subsequently plagued by dreams of a mysterious figure beckoning him to travel north beyond the Wall. Bran's journey alongside a variety of companions lead him deeper into the lore and magic of the North, where he begins to discover various mysterious powers and abilities.

Martin told Rolling Stone in 2014 that Bran's momentous chapter with Jaime and Cersei is what "hooked" many readers early in the first novel. Bran's characterization in later seasons of the show, including his relationship to the White Walkers and the Night King, has generated many theories in the fandom, as well as significant critical interest.

== Character overview ==
The youngest point of view character in the novels, Bran is in the very first chapter and was set up by Martin as the main protagonist of the series. Mikal Gilmore of Rolling Stone noted in 2014 that the moment in A Game of Thrones in which Jaime Lannister pushes Bran to his likely death "grabs you by the throat". Martin commented in the interview:

I've had a million people tell me that was the moment that hooked them, where they said, "Well, this is just not the same story I read a million times before." Bran is the first viewpoint character. In the back of their heads, people are thinking Bran is the hero of the story. He's young King Arthur. We're going to follow this young boy—and then, boom: You don't expect something like that to happen to him. So that was successful [laughs].

In 2000, Martin called Bran the hardest character to write:

Number one, he is the youngest of the major viewpoint characters, and kids are difficult to write about. I think the younger they are, the more difficult. Also, he is the character most deeply involved in magic, and the handling of magic and sorcery and the whole supernatural aspect of the books is something I'm trying to be very careful with. So I have to watch that fairly sharply. All of which makes Bran's chapters tricky to write.

Booklist cited Bran as a notable character in 1999, and the Publishers Weekly review of A Game of Thrones noted, "It is fascinating to watch Martin's characters mature and grow, particularly Stark's children, who stand at the center of the book."

Noting Bran's absence in 2005's A Feast for Crows, James Poniewozik of Time wrote in his review of A Dance with Dragons (2011):

Some favorite characters were MIA for eleven long years. ADWD brings them back—bastard warrior Jon Snow, exiled dragon queen Daenerys Targaryen, fugitive dwarf Tyrion Lannister and crippled, mystical Bran Stark, among others—and almost from the get-go that gives it a narrative edge over its companion book. Each, in his or her own way, is dealing with a question of power.

=== Description ===
Brandon Stark, as described in the novels and depicted on the cover of Issue #23 of the graphic novels. Art by Mike S. Miller.

Bran is seven years old at the beginning of A Game of Thrones (1996). He is the fourth child and second son of Lord Eddard "Ned" Stark of Winterfell, Hand of the King, and his wife Lady Catelyn, and has five siblings: an older brother Robb, two older sisters Sansa and Arya, a younger brother Rickon, and an older illegitimate half-brother Jon Snow. Bran is constantly accompanied by his direwolf Summer, the intellectually disabled stableboy Hodor (who carries him around after his crippling), and the Reed siblings Meera and Jojen.

Martin describes Bran as favoring his mother in appearance, having the thick auburn hair and deep blue eyes of the Tullys. According to Martin, Bran is strong willed, but a sweet and thoughtful boy, well-loved by everyone at Winterfell. Before his fall he enjoyed climbing and exploring the walls and ramparts of the castle. He grew up wanting to be a knight for the Kingsguard, but those dreams were quickly brought to an end when Bran had to face the fact that he will never walk again. He is also dutiful and tough-minded.

With his dreams of being a knight dashed by the crippling attempt on his life in A Game of Thrones, duty forces Bran to overcome his new limitations and embrace his new abilities. Although he doesn't realize his newfound powers at first, he grows to discover what he can accomplish. His gradual acceptance of his seemingly-prophetic visions (called the "greensight") and his ability to psychically inhabit his direwolf Summer (which marks him as a type of skinchanger known as a warg) show his growing maturity and his worth beyond the loss of his legs. He also manages to enter Hodor's mind, and later skinchanges into crows and even weirwood trees under the mentorship of the Three-Eyed Crow.

== Storylines ==
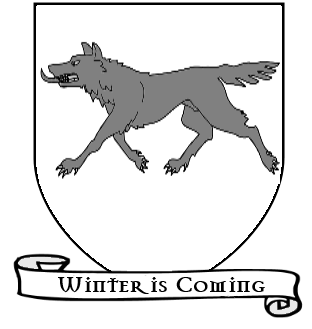
The coat of arms of House Stark.

=== A Game of Thrones ===
At the beginning of A Game of Thrones (1996), Bran accidentally witnesses Queen Cersei Lannister and her twin brother, Ser Jaime Lannister, having sex during King Robert Baratheon's visit to Winterfell, the seat of House Stark. Jaime pushes him out of the castle tower window he had climbed to hide the sibling incest, but he survives and falls into a coma. Although some characters speculate that Jaime and Cersei pushed Bran, no public accusations were made against the Crown. While Bran lies comatose, a fire is ignited at a nearby tower as a diversion, and an attempt on his life is carried out. Lady Catelyn Stark, his mother, who has remained with Bran while his eldest brother, Robb, takes care of the fire, is able to delay the assassin long enough for Bran's direwolf, Summer, to kill him. Senseless, Bran dreams of his plunge from the tower, accompanied by a three-eyed raven that offers to teach him to fly. Guided by the raven, Bran awakens, but the fall has left him paralyzed, unable even to feel his legs. Thereafter, he relies on the giant simpleton Hodor to get around and on a harness designed by Tyrion Lannister, who is disabled by dwarfism, to ride a horse. When Robb rides south in reaction to the arrest of his father, Hand of the King Lord Eddard "Ned" Stark, by the Lannisters in King's Landing in the wake of Robert's death, Bran becomes the acting lord of Winterfell.

=== A Clash of Kings ===
In 1998's A Clash of Kings, Robb is named King in the North, and Bran, as Robb's heir, rules Winterfell in his brother's absence. When Theon Greyjoy betrays the Starks and captures Winterfell, Bran and Rickon escape, aided by the wildling Osha. To hide his failure, Theon has two other children murdered and proclaims them to be Bran and Rickon. Having been hiding in the crypts of Winterfell, Bran and his companions emerge to find the castle in ruins, having been sacked by Ramsay Snow and a small garrison from House Bolton. They come upon a mortally wounded Maester Luwin, who advises their traveling party to split. Osha takes Rickon in the direction of White Harbor, while Bran, Hodor, Meera Reed, and Jojen Reed set off north to seek the three-eyed raven of Bran's dreams. Meanwhile, Bran has slowly accepted the veracity of his dreams and his ability to psychically inhabit Summer, which makes him a type of skin-changer known as a warg.

=== A Storm of Swords ===
Bran, Hodor, Meera, and Jojen travel north to the Wall in search of the three-eyed raven in A Storm of Swords (2000).

=== A Dance with Dragons ===
In A Dance with Dragons (2011), Bran, Hodor, Meera, and Jojen are joined by the mysterious Coldhands, and a Child of the Forest named Leaf takes them to the three-eyed raven (actually a human telepath), who in turn offers to train Bran in retrocognition and clairvoyance.

=== Family tree of House Stark ===
Descendants of Rickard Stark

Rickard	Lyarra
Brandon	Catelyn; Tully	Eddard	Lyanna (Note: In season 7 of the TV series Game of Thrones, Jon is revealed to be the son of Rhaegar Targaryen and Lyanna.)	Benjen
Robb	Jeyne; Westerling	Sansa	Tyrion; Lannister	Arya	Brandon	Rickon	Jon; Snow

== TV adaptation ==
Bran Stark is played by Isaac Hempstead Wright in the television adaptation of the books. Like the other children in the books, Bran is aged up for television. He begins the series as a 10-year-old boy—3 years older than his book counterpart—and is 17 by the end.

=== Storylines ===
Brandon "Bran" Stark is the second son and fourth child of Lord of Winterfell Eddard "Ned" Stark and Lady Catelyn Stark (née Tully). He was named after his deceased paternal uncle, Brandon.

==== Season 1 ====
Bran receives one of a litter of recovered direwolves found by the Stark children and names him Summer. During King Robert Baratheon's visit to Winterfell with his entourage, Bran accidentally interrupts Queen Cersei Lannister having sex with her twin brother, Ser Jaime Lannister, who shoves him out of the window of the tower Bran is observing them in, leaving him comatose. While he is unconscious and recovering from his injuries, Summer kills an assassin sent to murder Bran. When he wakes, Bran cannot recall the events before his fall and finds that he is paralyzed from his waist down, forcing him to be carried everywhere by the stable boy, Hodor. Gradually, he discovers that he has gained the ability to assume Summer's consciousness, making him a warg or a skinchanger. After his older brother, Robb, is crowned King in the North, Bran becomes Robb's heir and the lord of Winterfell.

==== Season 2 ====
After Theon Greyjoy captures Winterfell, Osha helps Bran and his younger brother, Rickon, go into hiding. To cement his claim to Winterfell, Theon has two orphan boys killed and their bodies burned, and passes their charred corpses off as Bran and Rickon. After Theon's men betray him and Winterfell is sacked, Bran, Rickon, Hodor, Osha, and their direwolves head north to find his elder brother, the bastard Jon Snow, for safety.

==== Season 3 ====
Bran and his group encounter Jojen Reed and his sister, Meera, two siblings who aid them in their quest. Jojen shares Bran's "greensight" and tutors him in his prophetic visions. After coming close to the Wall, Osha departs with Rickon for Last Hearth (to keep him safe) while Bran insists on following his visions beyond the Wall. Bran and his group encounter Sam and Gilly, who try to persuade Bran not to venture beyond the Wall, but Bran claims it is his destiny and leaves through the gate with Hodor and the Reeds.

==== Season 4 ====
During their travels beyond the Wall, Bran and his group stumble across Craster's Keep, where they are captured and held by Night's Watch mutineers led by Karl Tanner. Night's Watchmen led by Jon eventually converge on Craster's Keep, but Locke, an agent of Roose Bolton pretending to be a new Watch recruit, finds Bran first and takes him hostage. Bran wargs into Hodor and snaps Locke's neck. The group then continues without telling Jon, who Jojen claims would stop them. Bran eventually reaches the Heart Tree but is set upon by wights outside the entrance. Jojen is killed in the attack, but the Children of the Forest lead Bran and his company safely into a magical cave to meet the Three-Eyed Raven. The Three-Eyed Raven declares that Bran will not walk again but will fly instead.

==== Season 6 ====
As part of his training, Bran is shown several visions of the past, including Ned Stark and Howland Reed confronting Ser Arthur Dayne and Ser Gerold Hightower at the Tower of Joy, and sees how the Children of the Forest injected one of the First Men with dragonglass in a ritual to create the Night King, the first White Walker, as a defense against the other First Men. However, the Three-Eyed Raven is always quick to withdraw Bran from the visions, warning that he may become trapped in them if he stays too long. Growing bored with his slow progress, Bran enters a vision on his own and witnesses the Night King in the present day, who sees Bran and marks him, making the Three-Eyed Raven's cave vulnerable to the White Walkers' magic.

The Three-Eyed Raven enters Bran into another vision of Winterfell's past to impart all his knowledge. Still, before the transfer is completed, the White Walkers attack the cave, killing the Three-Eyed Raven, Summer, and the Children of the Forest. Bran, still caught in the vision, wargs into Hodor through the latter's younger self (named Wylis), and he and Meera flee as Hodor carries Bran's unconscious body out of the cave. Meera carries Bran into the forest, while Hodor gives his life to hold back the cave door against the army of wights until they overwhelm him. Bran witnesses how his warging accidentally connects Hodor's past and present minds, causing a brain-damaging seizure in young Wylis and making him repeat Meera's command to "hold the door" over and over until he can only slur the word "Hodor".

After the wight army catches up to them again, Bran and Meera are rescued by Bran's uncle Benjen Stark, who had been killed by the White Walkers several years prior but was revived by the Children. Benjen quickly guides the duo to safety and tells them that Bran has become the Three-Eyed Raven and needs to learn to control his powers before the Night King attacks the Seven Kingdoms. Benjen leaves Bran and Meera at the weirwood in the Haunted Forest because the Wall's magic stops the dead (and therefore Benjen) from passing. When Bran touches the weirwood, he sees the rest of the vision of Ned Stark at the Tower of Joy. He learns that Lyanna Stark died giving birth to Rhaegar Targaryen's son Aegon, whom Ned found and raised as Jon Snow at Lyanna's last wish.

==== Season 7 ====
Bran returns to Winterfell, which has been rebuilt and reoccupied by the remaining Starks. Jon Snow has traveled to Dragonstone to meet with Daenerys Targaryen, after which he is finally reunited at Winterfell with Sansa and Arya, who are both concerned by Bran's knowledge about their tribulations following Ned's execution. Petyr "Littlefinger" Baelish gives Bran a Valyrian steel dagger (the one used by Bran's would-be assassin in season one), which Bran passes to Arya. Meera leaves Winterfell to return to Greywater Watch; Bran's indifference to her departure makes her realize that Bran "died" in the Three-Eyed Raven's cave. For that reason, Bran remains aloof from his siblings, as well. He uses his greenseeing abilities to discover Littlefinger's betrayal of Ned. When Sansa confronts Littlefinger about his treason towards House Stark, Bran corroborates the accusations leveled against him, and Arya kills Littlefinger at Sansa's command, avenging all the lives lost as a result of the War of the Five Kings.

Samwell Tarly arrives in Winterfell and comes to visit Bran. Bran tells Sam about his discovery that Jon is the bastard son of Rhaegar and Lyanna. Still, Sam mentions a former high septon's record of annulling Rhaegar's marriage to Elia Martell so that he could marry Lyanna. Bran uses greenseeing to confirm that the marriage took place, then revisits the vision of the Tower of Joy and discovers that Jon's real name is Aegon Targaryen. Bran declares that Jon is, therefore, the heir to House Targaryen.

==== Season 8 ====
Bran is reunited with Jon when he returns to Winterfell with Daenerys Targaryen and her forces. Bran reveals to them that the Night King has reanimated Daenerys's dragon Viserion and used it to breach the Wall. Bran urges Sam to tell Jon the truth of his parentage, upon which Jon abdicates his claim in favor of Daenerys. Jaime later arrives at Winterfell to aid in the fight against the dead, but Bran does not reveal Jaime's role in crippling him.

At the war council before the battle against the dead, Bran explains that the Night King wants to create an endless winter and will try to kill him during the fight because of his ability to hold humanity's collective memories. He persuades the council to let him wait in the Godswood as bait for the Night King. Theon, who has returned to Winterfell to fight the dead with his men, offers to defend Bran, while Jon and Daenerys plan to hide and wait to attack the Night King when he appears. The Night King eventually breaches the castle and approaches Bran, killing Theon in the process. He is about to kill Bran, but Arya intervenes and manages to stab the Night King with the Valyrian steel dagger, destroying the Night King along with all the other White Walkers and undead he raised.

Westeros is left without a ruler when, after Daenerys successfully wrests King's Landing from Cersei Lannister, she proceeds to burn the surrendered populace of the city, during which Cersei is also killed. Jon fails to dissuade Daenerys from further destruction and ultimately assassinates her. He is arrested. Weeks later, Tyrion Lannister proposes choosing Bran as the new king before a council of the lords and ladies of Westeros. He reasons that it would make a good story to unite the people, suggesting that future kings be elected by the lords of Westeros rather than inheriting the crown. When Tyrion asks Bran if he is willing to be king, Bran replies, "Why do you think I came all this way?" The council holds a vote and all agree except for Sansa, who instead requests the North's independence as it was before Aegon Targaryen's conquest, which Bran accepts. Tyrion subsequently declares Bran as Bran the Broken, King of the Six Kingdoms. He appoints Tyrion as his Hand of the King to compensate for the mistakes he made as Daenerys's Hand. Later, Brienne of Tarth, Bronn, Davos Seaworth, and Sam form Bran's small council. It is revealed that Bran has decided to exile Jon to the Night's Watch for killing Daenerys as a compromise to appease Daenerys's supporters and avoid another civil war. As Jon leaves, he apologizes to Bran for not being there for him, but Bran responds, "You were exactly where you were supposed to be." Bran tasks himself with finding Drogon.

== See also ==
- Night King
