= Davos Seaworth =

- A Song of Ice and Fire character Game of Thrones character
- Liam Cunningham as Davos Seaworth
- First appearance: Novel: A Clash of Kings (1998); Television: "The North Remembers" (2012)
- Last appearance: Television: "The Iron Throne" (2019)
- Created by: George R. R. Martin
- Portrayed by: Liam Cunningham

In-universe information
- Aliases: The Onion Knight; Davos Shorthand; Davos the Smuggler; Davos of Flea Bottom; Knight of the Onion Ship; Ser Onions; Onion Lord
- Gender: Male
- Titles: Ser; Lord of the Rainwood; Admiral of the Narrow Sea; Hand of the King; Television: Master of Ships
- Occupation: Smuggler (previously)
- Family: House Seaworth
- Spouse: Marya Seaworth
- Children: Matthos Seaworth; Novels: Dale Seaworth; Allard Seaworth; Maric Seaworth; Devan Seaworth; Stannis Seaworth; Steffon Seaworth

Davos Seaworth, also known as the Onion Knight or Davos Shorthand, is a fictional character from the A Song of Ice and Fire series of epic fantasy novels by American writer George R. R. Martin, and its television adaptation Game of Thrones. He is a prominent point of view character in the novels.

Davos first appears in 1998's A Clash of Kings and later in A Storm of Swords (2000) and A Dance with Dragons (2011), serving as Stannis Baratheon's most trusted counselor. Davos comes from humble means and is an extraordinary sea captain who had a very successful early career as a smuggler. He came into Stannis' service during Robert's Rebellion after slipped through Targaryen loyalists' blockade on Storm's End to bring a shipful of much-needed foods to Stannis' starving forces defending the castle. As appreciation for saving his men, Stannis promoted Davos as a knight and a vassal lord, but as justice for Davos' past criminal career, Stannis personally cut off the fingertips of Davos' left hand as punishment. Davos considers Stannis' judgement fair, and serves dutifully as Stannis' master of ships, and remains stubbornly loyal to Stannis despite fearing the growing influence of the Red Priestess Melisandre.

Davos is portrayed by Irish actor Liam Cunningham in the HBO television adaptation.

== Character ==
Davos is of low birth, being born into the life of a poor commoner in King's Landing's Flea Bottom. Despite being illiterate, Davos is a talented seafarer who excels at navigating treacherous shallows, and became one of the most infamous smugglers of the Seven Kingdoms in his youth, often piloting his black-sailed ship into harbors undetected in the dead of night. He married a woman named Marya, with whom he had seven sons: Dale, Allard, Matthos, Maric, Devan, Stannis and Steffon.

At the time of Robert Baratheon's rebellion against the Targaryen dynasty, Davos evaded the loyalist blockade of Shipbreaker Bay and smuggled a shipment of onions and salted fish into Storm's End to Stannis Baratheon and his starving troops, whose ration were depleted under siege by Mace Tyrell and the Redwynes. The food that Davos brought through enabled Stannis' men to hold on for almost another year until Eddard Stark arrived to relieve the siege. As a reward for this service, Stannis knighted Davos and awarded him nobility status with choice lands on Cape Wrath, for which Davos chose "Seaworth" as the name of his new house. However, also as a punishment for his past years of criminal activity as a smuggler, Stannis personally "shortened" Davos's left hand, cutting off the first joint from each finger. Despite this, Davos considers Stannis's judgement fair and deserving, and keeps the bones of his severed fingertips in a pouch hung around his neck as a good luck charm, calling them his "luck".

Davos is humble and introverted, but is stubbornly outspoken on matters he considers morally important. He is very loyal to Stannis due to the life opportunities that Stannis' knighting provided him and his family. Davos is a devout believer in the Faith of the Seven, which puts him at odds with Stannis' new spiritual adviser, the Red Priestess Melisandre, who converted Queen Selyse Baratheon and a number of Stannis' knights (collective known as "Queen's Men") to the oriental religion of R'hllor. Davos always tries to serve Stannis with honesty, speaking his mind instead of simply saying what Stannis likes to hear, which earns him Stannis's silent respect in return despite the often-heated disagreements between them.

== Storylines ==
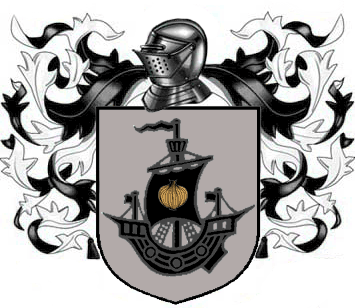
Coat of arms of Davos Seaworth

=== A Clash of Kings ===
Stannis Baratheon names himself the legitimate heir to his late brother King Robert, citing the real identities of Robert's three nominal children Joffrey, Tommen and Myrcella as bastards born of incestuous affairs between Queen Cersei and her twin brother Ser Jaime and therefore ineligible to claim the Iron Throne. Davos supports Stannis' claim, despite his disapproval of Stannis's recent religious conversion to the faith of R'hllor, the so-called Lord of Light, which Stannis and his wife Selyse adopted under the influence of the new spiritual adviser Melisandre, a powerful, enigmatic and seductive priestess who dresses in red and excels in fire magic and shadowmancy, about whom Davos already has bitter misgivings. Davos is tasked with delivering letters exposing Cersei's sibling incest, but Stannis still receives limited support from other noble lords.

Davos sails with Stannis to lay siege to Storm's End when Stannis's younger brother Renly also declares himself king. Renly arrogantly rebuffs Stannis' claim and attempts to defeat and kill Stannis with a much larger army, as he has supports from most of the Stormlands and alliance from the Reach from his marriage to Margaery Tyrell, but he is later assassinated in his own tent by a mysterious "shadow". Despite Renly's death, the castellan of Storm's End, Ser Cortnay Penrose, still refuses to surrender. Davos advises attacking King's Landing before taking Storm's End, but Stannis fears that the Stormlords will not follow him if he appears unable to capture the castle. Davos is then tasked to personally smuggle Melisandre into the caverns underneath Storm's End, where he witnesses her, to his horror, giving birth to another "shadow" in the shape of Stannis that goes ahead and assassinates Penrose. Penrose's death allows Stannis to claim the Stormlands and seize custody of Robert's only highborn bastard Edric Storm.

Stannis then marches on King's Landing with a combined amphibious assault from the Blackwater Bay, and seems certain to win as the Lannister main host is held up in the Riverlands fighting Robb Stark's Northern army. Davos is given command of his own galley Black Bertha, though he disagrees with the campaign's commander-in-charge, Stannis's brother-in-law Ser Imry Florent, who ignores Davos' many warnings of tactical errors. Despite the numerical superiority of Stannis' forces, Tyrion Lannister, the Iron Throne's acting Hand of the King who is put in charge of defending King's Landing, traps Stannis' vanguard fleet with a hidden river chain and destroys much of it with wildfire, killing Imry and Davos's four oldest sons. Davos is blown overboard by the explosion in the ambush but survives after being washed ashore and stranded on seamounts known as the Spears of the Merling King, losing his "luck" in the process, and he is eventually recovered by Stannis' surviving sailors. At the same time, the Lannister forces, returning after receiving ṯimely news of Stannis' siege and having secured a marriage alliance with the Tyrells, arrive and attack Stannis' army from the rear, defeating him.

=== A Storm of Swords ===
Blaming Melisandre for the loss at the Battle of the Blackwater (due to Tyrion's use of wildfire and Melisandre's religious associations with fire), Davos plots to murder the priestess. However, Melisandre foresees it, and Davos is imprisoned by Stannis's uncle-in-law Ser Axell Florent, who also threatens to kill Davos if he does not help Axell become Stannis's Hand of the King. Imprisoned with Davos is Stannis's Hand and uncle-in-law Lord Alester Florent, who was imprisoned for trying to negotiate with the Lannisters behind Stannis's back.

Stannis releases Davos to hear his counsel on attacking Claw Isle, and Davos claims that it would be unjust to attack despite Lord Celtigar bending the knee to Joffrey, as its people are innocent and only following their Lord. Pleased by his honesty, Stannis names Davos Admiral of the Narrow Sea, Lord of the Rainwood, and Hand of the King. Davos then watches a blood ritual whereby Stannis uses blood leeched from Edric Storm to curse the three rival kings: Joffrey Baratheon, Balon Greyjoy and Robb Stark.

After Robb is murdered at the Red Wedding and Balon later dies from a suspicious fall off a chain bridge, Stannis and Melisandre consider sacrificing Edric to raise a rumored dragon sleeping under Dragonstone, despite Davos' objection, but Stannis does agree to spare Edric until Joffrey is slain, too. On hearing of Joffrey's poisoning death at his own royal wedding, Davos hastily smuggles Edric to the Free Cities in Essos to protect him from Melisandre, but Stannis does not punish him. Learning to read, Davos comes across a plea for aid from the Night's Watch, and convinces Stannis to sail north and help defend the Wall against an invasion of wildlings fleeing the Others. Davos follows Stannis as they make port at Eastwatch-by-the-Sea, where the Dragonstone forces march on to reinforce Castle Black and arrive just in time to rout the wildling army under Mance Rayder.

=== A Feast for Crows and A Dance With Dragons ===
Davos does not go with Stannis' army to Castle Black and is instead sent to White Harbor to persuade Lord Wyman Manderly, the wealthiest and second-most powerful Northern lord, to support Stannis' war effort. After being abandoned by the Lyseni sellsail Salladhor Saan, the escortless Davos manages to arrive at White Harbor after a much-troubled journey via Sisterton, and discovers that House Manderly are already hosting three visiting members of House Frey, who previously betrayed House Stark at the Red Wedding and massacred unarmed Northmen, including Lord Wyman's younger son Ser Wendel Manderly. Alone and disadvantaged, Davos nevertheless stands his ground and argues the North should support Stannis, as that will give them vengeance. Davos' speech has aroused support from Lord Wyman's wilful granddaughter Wylla, but Wyman appears disinterested with Davos' proposition and instead has him arrested. To satisfy the Freys, Wyman orders Davos to be executed as a token of allegiance to the Iron Throne, and Davos' severed head and hands are allegedly mounted on the city wall for the Freys to see, while Wyman sends word to King's Landing as a gesture of fealty.

In reality, the Manderlys have executed a criminal who vaguely resembles Davos, and had the substitute's left fingertips cut off to make it convincing. Davos is instead kept imprisoned but treated well in the Wolf's Den, and is later released and taken to meet with Wyman in secrecy by Robett Glover, who is also Wyman's secret guest. Wyman apologizes to Davos for the earlier reception and explains that he cannot publicly defy the Lannisters while his only surviving son and heir, Ser Wylis, is a captive at Harrenhal. Still, the fake execution has worked, and Wylis is being released home. Wyman implies he plans to murder the three Freys after they depart, and reveals that many other Northern lords also wish to overthrow House Bolton, who has assumed control of the North after betraying House Stark at the Red Wedding, but dare not openly defy the Boltons unless a legitimate Stark heir can be found. Wyman also reveals to Davos that he has been harboring Wex Pyke, Theon Greyjoy's mute squire, who is a hidden survivor and witness to Ramsay Snow's sacking of Winterfell and has secretly followed the fleeing Rickon Stark and Osha, who have gone to the fabled cannibal island of Skagos. Wyman then tells Davos that if he can successfully retrieve Rickon from Skagos, House Manderly will support Stannis' claim.

== TV adaptation ==
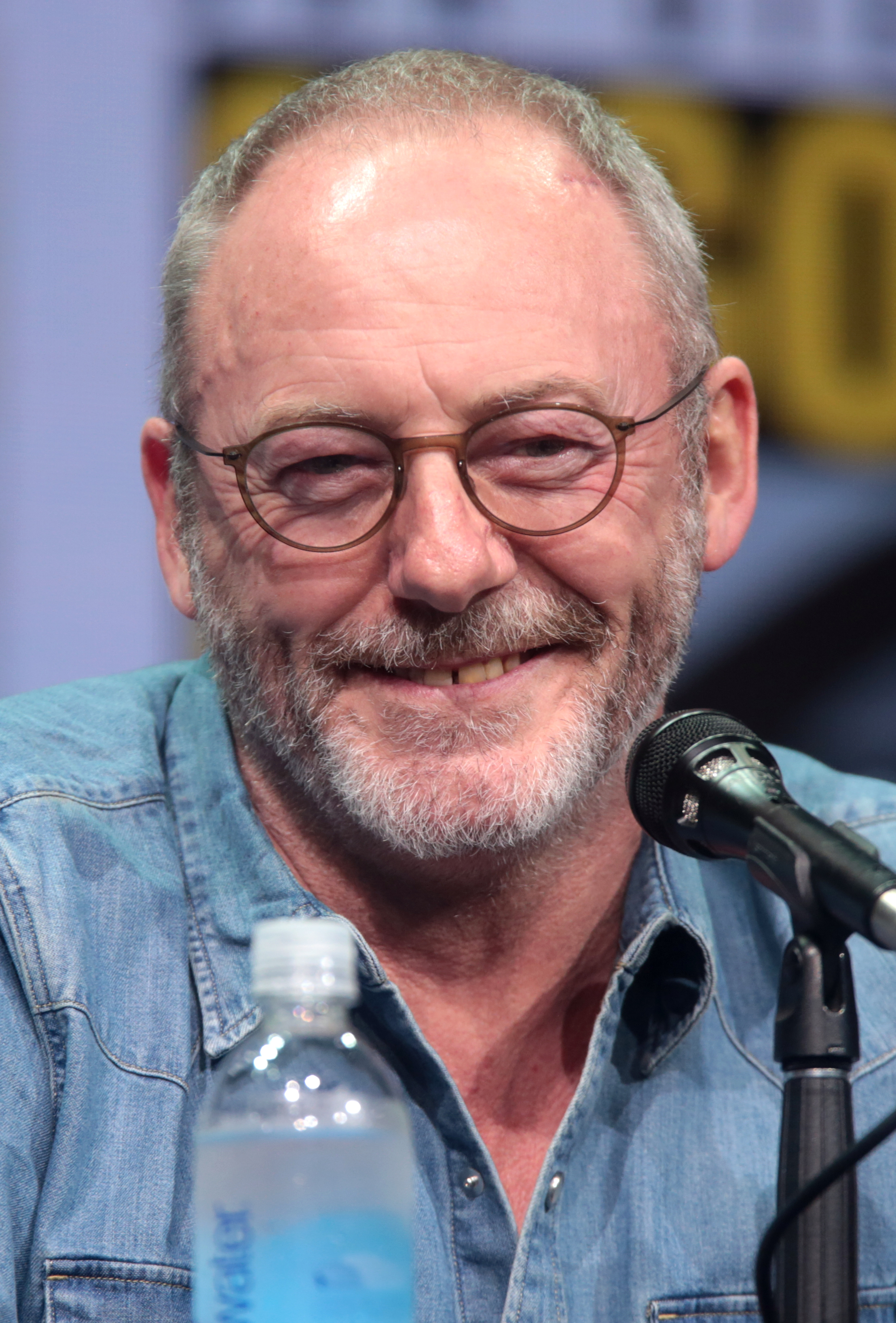
Liam Cunningham plays the role of Davos Seaworth in the television series

In the HBO series, Davos has the top two tips of the fingers taken from his right hand (as actor Liam Cunningham is left-handed). He references having multiple sons, but only one (Matthos) is seen or included in the story. He also forms a close fatherly relationship with Stannis' disfigured daughter, Princess Shireen (played by Kerry Ingram), which wasn't described in the novels.

=== Season 2 ===
When Renly refuses to surrender to Stannis, Davos is ordered to sail with Melisandre beneath Storm's End. When they reach shore, Davos is horrified when Melisandre gives birth to a shadowy demon, who kills Renly. The Stormlords bend the knee to Stannis, who plans to launch a naval attack on King's Landing and gives Davos command of the fleet. As the Baratheon fleet arrives in Blackwater Bay, a ship filled with wildfire is detonated in the middle of the fleet; Davos's ship is one of the closest, and he is thrown into the sea when his ship is destroyed.

=== Season 3 ===
Davos is revealed to have survived by swimming to a rock and is rescued by his friend, the pirate Salladhor Saan, who reveals that Matthos died during the Battle of the Blackwater. Grief-stricken by the death of his son, Davos blames Melisandre for Stannis's defeat and unsuccessfully tries to assassinate her before being thrown into the dungeons. During his captivity, Stannis's daughter Shireen discovers that Davos is illiterate and teaches him to read. Stannis eventually releases Davos, naming him as his Hand. Soon after, Stannis and Melisandre plot to sacrifice Robert's bastard, Gendry, until Davos frees him and helps him escape Dragonstone. An enraged Stannis resolves to execute Davos, until Davos presents a letter from Castle Black warning of the White Walkers' return. Melisandre corroborates this and counsels Stannis that he will need Davos when the Long Night comes, thus prompting Stannis to pardon Davos.

=== Season 4 ===
After Joffrey Baratheon's death, Stannis reprimands Davos for not being able to secure more men. Davos arranges a meeting with Tycho Nestoris, a representative of the Iron Bank of Braavos, and persuades him to give their financial backing to Stannis instead. Davos uses the money to hire ships and sellswords, and the Baratheon army travels to the Wall, defeating the wildling army besieging it.

=== Season 5 ===
Davos accompanies the Baratheon forces on their march to Winterfell. During their march, Ramsay Bolton and his men infiltrate the camp and destroy their supplies. Davos is sent back to the Wall to ask for more supplies, unaware that Stannis plans to sacrifice Shireen to ensure his victory. Lord Commander Jon Snow, though sympathetic, is unable to offer help. Soon after, Melisandre arrives at Castle Black, having fled in the aftermath of Shireen's sacrifice. Davos realises that Stannis has been defeated and Shireen is dead, though Melisandre does not reveal her role.

=== Season 6 ===
Davos is the first to discover Jon Snow's body after his assassination, and barricades his body in a storeroom with the help of Jon's loyalists. After the wildlings imprison the mutineers who killed Jon, Davos persuades Melisandre to attempt a resurrection of Jon, which is ultimately successful. Jon's death releases him from his Night's Watch vows and he decides to gather allies to march with him on Winterfell. Davos accompanies him and is able to convince the young Lady Lyanna Mormont to offer House Mormont's support, though few other houses do the same. During the army's march to Winterfell, Davos finds the remnants of a sacrificial pyre and the burnt remains of the wooden stag he had carved for Shireen as a gift and realises that she had been sacrificed by Melisandre. Davos initially keeps this revelation to himself, instead participating in the Stark loyalists' victory over the Bolton forces. After the battle has been won and Winterfell retaken, Davos confronts Melisandre. When Melisandre confesses to killing Shireen, Jon exiles her from the North and Davos threatens to execute her personally if she ever returns. Davos is later among the Northern and Vale lords who crown Jon as the King in the North.

=== Season 7 ===
Jon receives an invitation from Daenerys Targaryen to come to Dragonstone to bend the knee. Though apprehensive, Jon decides to go to obtain access to Dragonstone's dragonglass mines, taking Davos with him. There, Davos supports Jon's claim that the White Walkers have returned, whilst almost accidentally revealing Jon's resurrection in the process. Daenerys is unconvinced, but permits them to mine the dragonglass as a gesture of goodwill. Daenerys's advisor Tyrion Lannister suggests that Jon go beyond the Wall to capture a wight, to present to Queen Cersei Lannister as evidence of the White Walkers.

Davos smuggles Tyrion into King's Landing to arrange a meeting between Cersei, Daenerys, and Jon after their return, while Davos seeks out Gendry, who is hiding as a blacksmith in King's Landing. Despite being encouraged to conceal his identity, Gendry reveals his parentage to Jon and is allowed to join Jon in the journey beyond the Wall. Davos travels with Jon and his party to Eastwatch-by-the-Sea, staying at the castle while the others seek out a wight. Gendry returns in the evening, telling Davos that Jon and his allies are surrounded by the White Walkers and ordering a raven to be sent to Dragonstone to request Daenerys's assistance. Daenerys arrives with her dragons to rescue Jon's allies, while Jon flees to Eastwatch on horseback. Davos joins Jon, Daenerys, and Sandor Clegane as they journey to King's Landing. There, they meet Queen Cersei, who is shocked by the wight captured by Jon. Cersei pledges her forces in the fight against the White Walkers, and Davos sails back to Winterfell with Jon, Daenerys, and their army.

=== Season 8 ===
After arriving at Winterfell, Davos, Tyrion, and Lord Varys discuss the implications of Jon and Daenerys' budding romantic relationship. As the White Walkers approach Winterfell, Davos spends time with Tyrion, Podrick Payne, Brienne of Tarth, Ser Jaime Lannister, and Tormund Giantsbane. Shortly thereafter, the Walkers' army arrives, and Melisandre returns to aid the Northern forces with her fire magic. Before Davos can threaten to execute her, Melisandre tells him she will be dead before dawn. Davos survives the Battle of Winterfell, during which he helps command the Northern army. As dawn breaks, Davos watches as Melisandre removes her enchanted necklace and fades to bones in the snow. In the aftermath, Davos celebrates with the survivors and joins Jon when he marches the bulk of the remaining allied army to face Cersei.

In the final episode of the series, Davos accompanies Jon into the devastated city of King's Landing, intervening in a futile attempt to prevent the execution of Lannister prisoners by Grey Worm and the Unsullied. He is last seen as a member of King Bran's Small Council, tasked with the rebuilding of fleets and forts.
