= Rickon Stark =

Character in A Song of Ice and Fire

- A Song of Ice and Fire character Game of Thrones character
- Art Parkinson as Rickon Stark
- First appearance: Novel: A Game of Thrones (1996); Television: "Winter Is Coming" (2011)
- Last appearance: Television: "Battle of the Bastards" (2016)
- Created by: George R. R. Martin
- Adapted by: D.B. Weiss & David Benioff (Game of Thrones)
- Portrayed by: Art Parkinson

In-universe information
- Gender: Male
- Title: Prince of Winterfell
- Family: House Stark
- Relatives: Ned Stark (father); Catelyn Tully (mother); Robb Stark (brother); Sansa Stark (sister); Arya Stark (sister); Bran Stark (brother); Theon Greyjoy (foster brother); Rickard Stark (grandfather); Lyarra Stark (grandmother); Brandon Stark (uncle); Lyanna Stark (aunt); Benjen Stark (uncle); Hoster Tully (grandfather); Minisa Whent (grandmother); Lysa Tully (aunt); Edmure Tully (uncle); Brynden Tully (granduncle); Robert Arryn (cousin); Novels: Jon Snow (half-brother); Television: Jon Snow (cousin/adoptive brother)
- Origin: Winterfell, The North

Rickon Stark is a fictional character in the A Song of Ice and Fire series of epic fantasy novels by American author George R. R. Martin and its television adaptation, Game of Thrones, in which he is portrayed by Irish actor Art Parkinson. Introduced in 1996's A Game of Thrones, Rickon subsequently appears in Martin's A Clash of Kings (1998) and will appear in the upcoming The Winds of Winter.

== Character description ==
Rickon is the fifth and youngest child of Lord Eddard "Ned" Stark and his wife, Catelyn Stark (née Tully), and has five siblings—Robb, Sansa, Arya, Bran, and his illegitimate half-brother Jon Snow. Like his brothers and sisters, Rickon is constantly accompanied by his direwolf, Shaggydog, with whom he shares a strong connection. Martin describes Rickon as favoring his mother in appearance. He is naturally aggressive, bold, tough, strong-willed, and violent: traits reflected in his direwolf companion, Shaggydog.

== Storylines ==
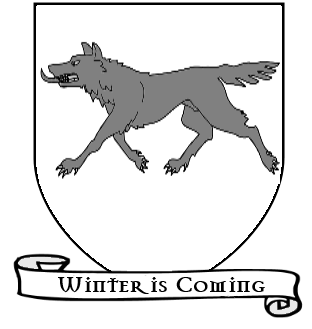
Coat of arms of House Stark

=== Novels ===
Rickon Stark is not a point-of-view character in the novels and is mostly a background character. His actions are witnessed and interpreted through the eyes of his older brother Bran.

==== A Game of Thrones ====
In A Game of Thrones (1996), Ned Stark departs Winterfell with his daughters to serve King Robert Baratheon in King's Landing. His wife, Catelyn, remains behind with their sons, grief-stricken over their comatose son Bran. All an overwhelmed young Rickon can do is follow around his eldest brother, Robb, crying. Upset when Robb prepares to leave, Rickon hides in the crypts of Winterfell. Shortly after Ned's death in King's Landing, both Bran and Rickon share a vision of their father's spirit in the crypts below the holdfast.

==== A Clash of Kings ====
As recounted in 1998's A Clash of Kings, following Ned's death, Rickon is largely unsupervised as Robb and Catelyn leave for war and his sisters are held captive at King's Landing. Alone with his now-disabled, paraplegic brother Bran, Rickon develops an unruly, often violent temper. His fear and rage are reflected in Shaggydog, who turns largely feral and attacks several people before being restrained. Several times, Bran's direwolf, Summer, is forced to fight Shaggydog into submission. Bran and Rickon become Theon Greyjoy's hostages when Theon takes Winterfell by force. He later manages to escape and hide in the crypts below the castle with Bran, Hodor, the Reed siblings, Meera and Jojen Reed, and the wildling woman Osha. After Winterfell is sacked and burned by Ramsay Bolton, the group emerges to find Winterfell in ruins. A mortally wounded Maester Luwin tells them that Bran and Rickon need to be separated and taken into hiding. Osha flees with Rickon in her care, and the others accompany Bran.

==== A Dance with Dragons ====
In A Dance with Dragons (2011), most of Westeros believes Rickon is dead, but Lord Wyman Manderly hears from a survivor of the sack of Winterfell that Rickon is allegedly alive and has fled with a woman to the island of Skagos. Skagos is a large northern island in the mouth of the Bay of Seals and is subject to the rule of House Stark. In return for pledging his loyalty to Stannis Baratheon instead of the Lannisters, Manderly tasks Ser Davos Seaworth with retrieving Rickon from Skagos so that they may reveal him to the Northern lords and inspire them to rally against Roose Bolton, Ramsay Bolton, and Walder Frey for betraying the Starks.

==== Family tree of House Stark ====
Descendants of Rickard Stark

Rickard	Lyarra
Brandon	Catelyn; Tully	Eddard	Lyanna (Note: In season 7 of the TV series Game of Thrones, Jon is revealed to be the son of Rhaegar Targaryen and Lyanna.)	Benjen
Robb	Jeyne; Westerling	Sansa	Tyrion; Lannister	Arya	Brandon	Rickon	Jon; Snow

=== TV adaptation ===
Rickon Stark is played by Art Parkinson in the television adaptation of the book series. During an interview with YouTube channel Flicks and the City in 2014, Parkinson mentioned that he was not allowed by his parents to watch Game of Thrones due to its adult content, apart from a few scenes that were related to him. In a later interview published in the New Zealand Herald on 7 April 2015, Parkinson admitted that he was put off from watching Game of Thrones after seeing a 3-year-old child getting his throat slit in one episode. In a later interview with IGN, he admitted that he had begun watching the series.

In a later interview with IGN, Parkinson spoke about his return and death, saying: "Whenever I was told that I was coming back for season 6, before they sent me through the scripts and stuff, they sent me through a ring just to say, 'Listen, so that you don't get a shock whenever you read the scripts, just know that you die this season.'" He continued, "Whenever I came back, I was excited to come back, and the scenes all seemed pretty amazing. I was so happy to re-embrace the character."

Parkinson has said that his fellow castmember Natalia Tena, who played Rickon's travelling companion Osha, helped him with his acting. He also shared what he believes Rickon went through after the death of his father Ned Stark, saying "After the death of his father, I think he became very independent and very angry, I think Rickon is a little bit more mature now. He's been away for quite a long time at this point. I think he's a bit more independent and stronger-willed."

Remarking on the character's exit and death:

It was sad at first, but once I realized how I was going to die in it, then it was cool. It was a cool death, and it was always going to be a good death, so at the same time, I was pretty happy.

==== Season 1–3 ====
Rickon Stark is Lord Eddard and Lady Catelyn's youngest child, naturally aggressive, and strong-willed. His black direwolf, Shaggydog, shares these qualities. When Theon Greyjoy captures Winterfell in season 2, Rickon hides in the crypts with Bran, Hodor, and the wildling woman Osha. After Theon cannot seem to find where Rickon and Bran are, he has two farm boys killed and burned to pass their charred bodies off as the Stark boys'. After Winterfell is sacked and burned, Rickon, Bran, Hodor, Osha, and the direwolves travel through the North. In season 3, before they reach the Wall, Rickon, Osha, and Shaggydog split up from the rest of the group and head to Last Hearth, the seat of House Umber.

==== Season 6 ====
Following Lord Greatjon Umber's death, Rickon and Osha are betrayed by Greatjon's heir, Smalljon, and handed over to the new Warden of the North, Ramsay Bolton, in order to secure an alliance with the Boltons against the wildlings Jon Snow has let through the Wall. To prove Rickon's identity, Smalljon kills Shaggydog and presents his head to Ramsay. Ramsay kills Osha, locks Rickon in the dungeons, and sends a letter to Jon at Castle Black demanding the return of Sansa Stark (his wife) and threatening to kill Rickon if Jon does not comply. In retaliation, Jon gathers an army of Stark loyalists and marches on Winterfell, now occupied by House Bolton.

As the armies prepare for battle outside Winterfell, Ramsay brings out Rickon and orders him to run to Jon in one of his sadistic "games," shooting arrows at Rickon to lure Jon into the open. Jon charges out to save Rickon, but Rickon is shot through the heart and dies almost instantly. In the aftermath of the ensuing battle, Rickon's body is recovered, and Jon buries him in the crypt, alongside Ned's remains.

Because many Northern noble houses were plotting against the Boltons in the books, the show's decision to have them betray Rickon led to fan theories that the direwolf head Smalljon Umber showed to Ramsay was fake and the Umbers would turn on the Boltons. Parkinson dispelled the rumours, confirming the direwolf head was intended to be real. Rickon's death scene referenced his first appearance in the series pilot, in which he laughs at Bran's poor archery shot before handing off arrows to the archer and running to stand by the target.

== Bibliography ==
- Martin, George R. R. (1996). Game of Thrones (UK ed.). Voyager Books. ISBN 0-00-224584-1.
- Martin, George R. R. (1998). A Clash of Kings (UK ed.). Voyager Books. ISBN 0-00-224585-X.
