= Theon Greyjoy =

Character in A Song of Ice and Fire

- A Song of Ice and Fire character Game of Thrones character
- Alfie Allen as Theon Greyjoy in Game of Thrones
- First appearance: Literature: A Game of Thrones (1996); Television: "Winter Is Coming" (2011)
- Last appearance: Television: "The Last of the Starks" (2019)
- Created by: George R. R. Martin
- Adapted by: D.B. Weiss & David Benioff (Game of Thrones)
- Portrayed by: Alfie Allen

In-universe information
- Aliases: Theon Turncloak; The Squid Prince; Reek
- Gender: Male
- Titles: Captain of Sea Bitch; Lord of Winterfell; Prince of Winterfell
- Family: House Greyjoy; House Stark (foster family)
- Relatives: Balon Greyjoy (father); Alannys Harlaw (mother); Rodrik Greyjoy (brother); Maron Greyjoy (brother); Asha/Yara Greyjoy (sister); Euron Greyjoy (uncle); Victarion Greyjoy (uncle); Aeron Greyjoy (uncle); Foster family: Eddard Stark (guardian/foster father); Robb Stark (foster brother); Jon Snow (foster brother); Sansa Stark (foster sister); Arya Stark (foster sister); Bran Stark (foster brother); Rickon Stark (foster brother)

Theon Greyjoy is a fictional character in the A Song of Ice and Fire series of fantasy novels by American author George R. R. Martin and its television adaptation, Game of Thrones. Theon is the youngest son and heir of Balon Greyjoy, taken as a ward by Lord Eddard Stark following Balon's failed rebellion. Theon's complex and troubled relationship with both his family and his captors is central to the character's arc throughout the novels and its television adaptation.

Introduced in 1996's A Game of Thrones, Theon subsequently appeared in A Clash of Kings (1998) and A Dance with Dragons (2011), in which he is reintroduced as "Reek", the tortured victim of Ramsay Bolton. He is one of the major third-person points of view through which Martin narrates both books.

Theon is portrayed by English actor Alfie Allen in the HBO television adaptation, who received widespread acclaim for his performance.

== Character description ==
Theon Greyjoy is the heir apparent and only living son of Balon Greyjoy. Theon is the narrator for a total of thirteen chapters in the second and fifth novels, A Clash of Kings and A Dance with Dragons. Theon is 19 in the first novel, and either 21 or 22 in the fifth. He is lean and handsome, and he has long black hair. He always smiles, and he seems to find everything amusing.

Nine years before the events of the series, Theon was taken hostage by Eddard Stark. He would have been executed had his father, Balon, displeased King Robert Baratheon. Theon was raised at Winterfell with the Stark children and developed a close friendship with Robb Stark. As an adult, Theon was arrogant, cocky, and proud until being imprisoned by Ramsay Snow, who is the eldest and bastard son of Roose Bolton. During his imprisonment, Ramsay severely tortured, maimed, and abused Theon physically and psychologically, forcing him to take the name of "Reek".

== Storylines ==
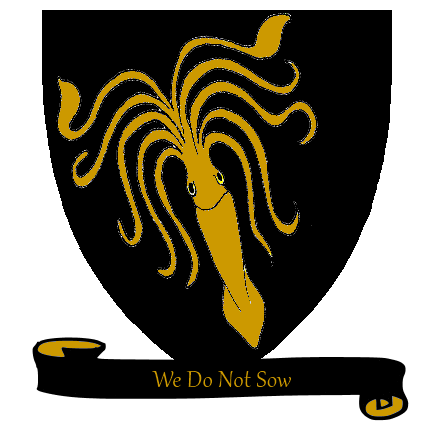
Coat of arms of House Greyjoy

=== A Game of Thrones ===
Theon Greyjoy becomes a trusted companion of Robb Stark on the battlefield, participating in the North's victories at Riverrun and the Whispering Wood.

=== A Clash of Kings ===
Robb sends Theon as an envoy to Pyke, seeking Balon Greyjoy's aid in his rebellion against House Lannister. Theon arrives to find that Balon instead intends to seize the North while Robb is fighting in the Riverlands. Theon is charged to raid on the Stony Shore, but he decides to take Winterfell. After sending some of his men to besiege Torrhen's Square and lure Winterfell's garrison away from the castle, Theon and his party invade and capture Winterfell. He releases the prisoner Reek, formerly a servant of House Bolton. When Bran and Rickon Stark apparently escape Winterfell, Reek advises Theon to kill two miller boys and pass their bodies off as those of the Stark children.

Winterfell's garrison soon repels the Ironborn at Torrhen's Square and besieges Winterfell. When Asha Greyjoy, his sister, refuses to give Theon men to hold the castle, he allows Reek to seek reinforcements from the Dreadfort. Reek returns with several hundred Bolton men; he kills Ser Rodrik Cassel and all the other Northmen, but he then reveals his true identity as Roose Bolton's bastard, Ramsay Snow. Ramsay kills the people of Winterfell; he burns the castle and takes Theon prisoner.

=== A Storm of Swords and A Feast for Crows ===
Ramsay imprisons Theon in the Dreadfort's dungeons and tortures him, though most of the Ironborn believed that Theon was dead. At some point, Theon manages to escape with his former bedwarmer, Kyra, though this turns out to be a trick of Ramsay's, and the two are soon recaptured; as a result, Kyra gets killed.

=== A Dance with Dragons ===
Ramsay's torture leaves Theon with some of his toes, fingers, and teeth missing. The trauma of this torture causes Theon to lose much of his body weight and turns his hair white. Psychologically broken, he is forced to assume the identity of Reek. When Roose Bolton begins to lead his forces back to the North, Ramsay (who has since been legitimised as a Bolton) forces Theon to convince the Ironborn garrison holding Moat Cailin to surrender but flays them regardless. Theon is forced to give away Jeyne Poole (who is presented as Arya Stark) at her wedding to Ramsay, who later sexually abuses both Theon and Jeyne. Theon later encounters Mance Rayder (disguised as Abel the bard) and his spearwives, who ask for his help in freeing "Arya Stark", having been sent by Jon Snow. When the alarm is raised, Theon jumps from Winterfell's battlements with Jeyne and is captured by Mors Umber, who sends him to Stannis Baratheon's camp several days' ride away. There, he reunites with Asha, who initially does not recognize him.

=== The Winds of Winter ===
Theon is kept prisoner by Stannis, who notes that he may have useful information about the Boltons but means to execute him for the supposed murders of Bran and Rickon. Asha unsuccessfully tries to ransom Theon before convincing Stannis to behead him rather than burn him alive.

=== Family tree of House Greyjoy ===
Family tree of House Greyjoy

Lady; Stonetree	Quellon	Lady; Piper
Lady; Sunderly
Harlon	Quenton	Donel	Balon IX	Alannys Harlaw	Euron III "Crow's Eye"	Victarion	Urrigon	Aeron "Damphair"	Robin
Rodrik	Maron	Asha Greyjoy (Note: For the TV series, Asha was renamed Yara)	Erik; Ironmaker	Theon	several bastard children

== TV adaptation ==
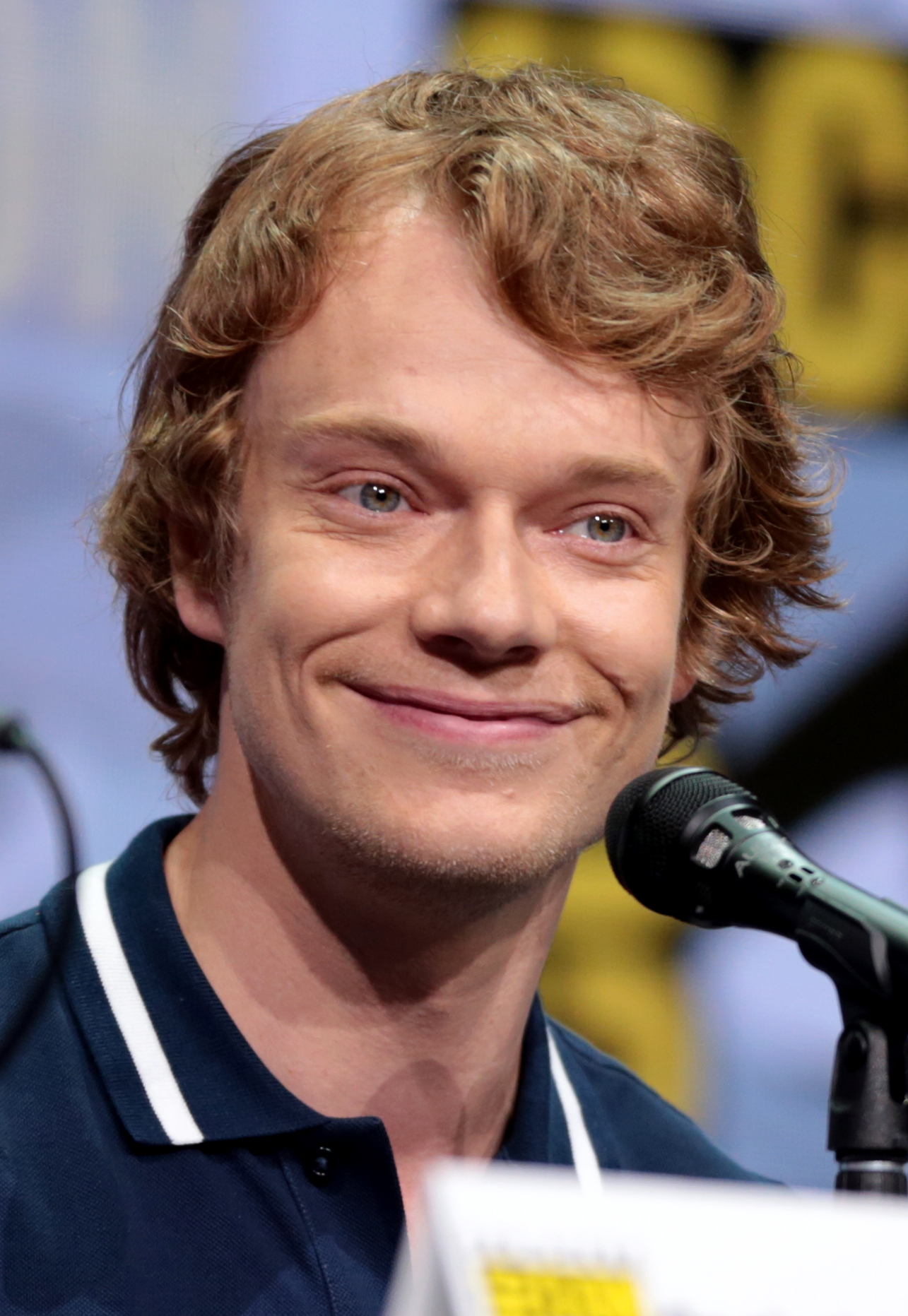
Alfie Allen plays the role of Theon Greyjoy in the television series

Theon Greyjoy is played by Alfie Allen in the television adaptation of the book series.

=== Season 1 ===
Theon is introduced as the hostage and ward of Lord Eddard Stark, stemming from the failed Greyjoy Rebellion. Despite his position, he remains loyal to Eddard and is good friends with his sons Robb and Jon. While he has never questioned his position, he soon begins to have doubts after Tyrion Lannister tells him he is nothing more than a servant to the Starks and that not everyone respects him. Nevertheless, Theon initially remains loyal to Robb after he goes to war with the Lannisters and supports his decision to have the North secede from the Seven Kingdoms and form their own kingdom.

=== Season 2 ===
Theon is sent to the Iron Islands to persuade Balon to ally with the Starks against the Lannisters, but Balon instead intends to conquer the North while its army is fighting in the Westerlands. Theon is insulted when he is given command of a single ship to raid the Stony Shore and contemplates sending a warning to Robb, but ultimately decides to remain loyal to his family. When his crew proves to be disrespectful of Theon's station, his first mate, Dagmer Cleftjaw, suggests that Theon prove himself by capturing Winterfell. Theon lures the Stark garrison away from Winterfell and easily captures the castle, but he is forced to execute his old mentor, Ser Rodrik Cassel, when the latter refuses to surrender. The wildling servant Osha seduces Theon to give Bran and Rickon Stark a chance to escape. Theon's men fail to recapture the two, and Theon kills two farm boys to pass their bodies off as those of the Stark boys—an act he soon feels guilty about.

Theon asks his sister Yara to bring reinforcements, but instead she arrives with a paltry force to warn Theon of his untenable position and to return to the Iron Islands. Theon refuses, and soon afterwards Winterfell is besieged by men of House Bolton commanded by the then-unnamed Ramsay Snow, the sadistic bastard son of Lord Roose Bolton. Theon attempts to rally his men to fight to the death, but they knock him out and hand him over to Ramsay, hoping for amnesty. Ramsay disobeys his orders to free the Ironborn and instead flays them all and sacks Winterfell, before taking Theon back to the Dreadfort as a prisoner.

=== Season 3 ===
Theon is captured and tortured in an unfamiliar castle but manages to escape with help from a serving boy claiming to serve Yara. However, he is taken back to his captors' castle, where the boy reveals himself as Ramsay Snow, Theon's actual captor. Ramsay then subjects Theon to brutal torture, including flaying and possibly castration, and forces him to adopt the name Reek, beating him until he accepts it. A severed body part, claimed to be Theon's penis, is sent in a box to Balon, with Ramsay threatening further mutilation unless the Ironborn withdraw from the North. Balon refuses, believing Theon's defiance has rendered him unable to continue the Greyjoy line. In response, Yara declares her intention to rescue him on her own initiative.

=== Season 4 ===
Theon, submitting to his identity as Reek, has been freed from his restraints but remains Ramsay's prisoner, living in the kennels with Ramsay's hounds. Yara infiltrates the Dreadfort, but he refuses to go with her, and she is forced to flee when Ramsay releases his hounds. Impressed by Theon's loyalty, Ramsay has him resume his identity as Theon Greyjoy to gain entry to Moat Cailin, a fortress held by the Ironborn that is blocking Roose Bolton's forces from returning North. Theon promises that Ramsay will give the Ironborn amnesty if they surrender, but Ramsay breaks his word and has the garrison flayed. Afterwards, Theon joins Ramsay (now legitimized as a Bolton) and the rest of House Bolton as they move to occupy Winterfell.

=== Season 5 ===
Theon is stunned to find that Ramsay has been betrothed to Sansa Stark. He tries to avoid her until Ramsay's psychotic paramour Myranda leads Sansa to Theon's sleeping quarters, a cage in the kennels. After learning of their reunion, Ramsay involves Theon in his torment of Sansa by having him give her away at the wedding and then forces him to watch as he rapes her on their wedding night. Sansa asks for Theon's assistance to escape from Ramsay, but Theon, wishing to spare her Ramsay's wrath, instead warns Ramsay, causing him to flay the maid who had tried to help Sansa escape. When Sansa confronts Theon, he confesses that he did not kill her brothers, but is too scared to give more information.

While Ramsay and the Bolton army attack Stannis Baratheon's forces, Sansa makes another escape attempt but is caught and threatened by Myranda. Finally snapping, Theon pushes Myranda off a walkway to her death just as the victorious Boltons return. Instead of facing Ramsay's anger, Theon and Sansa jump from the Winterfell battlements into the snow and escape.

=== Season 6 ===
Bolton hunters catch Theon and Sansa in the woods around Winterfell, but they are saved by the arrival of Brienne of Tarth and Podrick Payne, who kill the hunters. Although Sansa and Brienne decide to head for Castle Black, where Jon Snow is Lord Commander of the Night's Watch, Theon tells her that he does not deserve the Starks' forgiveness and instead chooses to return to the Iron Islands. When he gets back, Theon finds that Balon is dead and offers to support Yara at the Kingsmoot, a ceremony whereby the Ironborn choose their new leader. However, the Kingsmoot is won by Theon's uncle, Euron Greyjoy, who admits to killing Balon but wins over the Ironborn by promising to conquer Westeros through marriage to Daenerys Targaryen, who has the only known living dragons in the world. Recognizing that Euron will likely have them killed, Theon, Yara, and their loyalists escape the Iron Islands with the best ships of the Iron Fleet. They stop in Volantis for supplies and spend some time at a brothel. Theon remains deeply traumatized by Ramsay's torture, showing little interest in anything but his own regrets, but Yara urges him to find courage. They travel to Meereen, where Daenerys has established her seat, and form an alliance with her. During this time, Theon makes amends with Tyrion Lannister, who is advising Daenerys. Theon and Yara then join Daenerys as she sets sail for Westeros.

=== Season 7 ===
After Daenerys seizes Dragonstone as her base for the invasion of Westeros, Theon and Yara are sent with Ellaria Sand and the Sand Snakes to Dorne to transport the Dornish army to besiege King's Landing. However, Yara's fleet is attacked by Euron in the Narrow Sea, with Euron personally taking Yara captive. Theon is overcome by terror as the carnage breaks his fragile psyche, being rescued some time later by survivors of the battle unimpressed by his cowardice.

Theon returns to Dragonstone, seeking Daenerys' aid in freeing Yara, but discovers that Daenerys has left to confront the Lannister army on the Roseroad. He is confronted by Jon Snow, now King of the North after defeating Ramsay. Theon asks about Sansa's well-being. Jon grabs Theon by the lapels and furiously tells him that his life is only being spared since he helped save Sansa.

After Jon captures a wight beyond the Wall, Theon joins Daenerys, Jon, and their retinues as they present the wight to Queen Cersei Lannister as evidence of the White Walkers' threat. During the meeting, Theon is confronted by Euron, who threatens to execute Yara if Theon does not bend the knee to him. Returning to Dragonstone, Theon speaks to Jon, who reassures him that Theon is both a Stark and a Greyjoy and forgives him, urging him to find and rescue Yara. Inspired by this, and remembering that Yara was the only one who tried to free him from Ramsay, Theon orders the Ironborn survivors to aid him in freeing Yara. Their leader, Harrag, defies Theon and nearly beats him to death, but Theon eventually gains the upper hand and beats Harrag senseless. Having regained the respect of the Ironborn, Theon leads his men to find Yara.

=== Season 8 ===
Theon and his men infiltrate Euron's ship and rescue Yara. Yara decides to retake the Iron Islands while Euron is preoccupied in King's Landing, but gives Theon her blessing to travel to Winterfell with his men to stand with the Starks against the White Walkers. He reunites with Sansa and pledges fealty to House Stark for the impending battle.

At the war council before battle, Bran (who has since developed his greenseeing abilities to become the Three-Eyed Raven) declares that he will wait in the Godswood to lure out the Night King, commander of the White Walkers. Theon volunteers to defend him with the Ironborn. While preparing for battle, Theon attempts to apologize to Bran for his misdeeds, but Bran reassures him that his actions ultimately brought him back "home" to Winterfell.

Theon defends Bran against the undead until he is the last survivor, but the Night King arrives. Bran thanks Theon, and Theon charges at the Night King, but he is killed after the Night King impales him with his own spear. In the aftermath of the Long Night, Theon is cremated along with those slain in battle.

== Reception ==
Originally auditioning for the role of Jon Snow, English actor Alfie Allen has received critical acclaim for his role as Theon Greyjoy in the TV series, and was nominated for the Outstanding Supporting Actor in a Drama Series for the 2019 Primetime Emmy Awards.
