= White Walker =

Fictional entity in Game of Thrones

- A Song of Ice and Fire character
- A White Walker with an ice spear from Game of Thrones
- First appearance: Novel: A Game of Thrones (1996); Television: "Winter Is Coming" (2011)
- Last appearance: Television: House of the Dragon; "The Queen Who Ever Was" (2024)
- Created by: George R. R. Martin
- Portrayed by: Various actors

In-universe information
- Aliases: The Others; The Dead; White Shadows; Craster's Sons
- Type: Non-human creature

White Walkers are humanoid beings featured in the HBO television series Game of Thrones and the George R. R. Martin novel series A Song of Ice and Fire that inspired it. Primarily referred to as the Others in the novels, White Walkers are a supernatural threat to humanity who dwell north of the Wall in Westeros. The Verge named them among "the most visually iconic creatures on the show". White Walkers are also featured in the show's merchandising.

== Description ==
Martin introduces the Others in the prologue of A Game of Thrones (1996), describing them as "Tall [...] and gaunt and hard as old bones, with flesh pale as milk" with eyes "deeper and bluer than any human eyes, a blue that burned like ice". Accompanied by intense cold, they wear armor that "seemed to change color as it moved" and wield thin crystal swords capable of shattering steel. The Others move silently, and they speak their own language; Martin writes that their voices are "like the cracking of ice on a winter lake". In A Storm of Swords (2000), they are shown to be vulnerable to weapons made of dragonglass (obsidian), as Samwell Tarly kills one this way:

The Other's armor was running down its legs in rivulets as pale blue blood hissed and steamed around the black dragonglass dagger in its throat [...] where its fingers touched the obsidian they smoked [...] the Other shrank and puddled, dissolving away. In twenty heartbeats its flesh was gone, swirling away in a fine white mist. Beneath were bones like milkglass, pale and shiny, and they were melting too. Finally only the dragonglass dagger remained, wreathed in steam [...] Grenn bent to scoop it up and flung it down again at once. "Mother, that's cold."

In A Dance with Dragons (2011), Sam uncovers ancient record fragments that suggest the Others are also vulnerable to something called "dragonsteel", which he and Jon Snow surmise is another term for Valyrian steel.

Creatures killed by the Others quickly reanimate as wights: undead with pale skin, black hands, and glowing blue eyes that resemble those of the Others. Dragonglass has no effect on wights in the books (though it kills them in the TV series). Wights can be physically harmed, and even their dismembered parts stay animated, but fire can destroy them. The humans who live in the north beyond the Wall—called "wildlings" by the inhabitants of Westeros—burn their dead so they will not become wights. Wildlings call the Others "White Walkers", unlike others in Westeros.

== Novels ==
In 2012, Chris Lackner wrote in Dose: "Fans of the novels are eagerly awaiting Martin's final two installments of the seven-part series. In particular, they are eager to learn more about the White Walkers—or [t]he Others—a mysterious, undead race seemingly bent on humanity's destruction."

=== Backstory ===
In the novels and the 2014 companion book The World of Ice & Fire, Martin establishes that, millennia before the events of the A Song of Ice and Fire series, a pact existed between the Children of the Forest (elf-like creatures) and the First Men (humankind). This pact weakened with the emergence of the Others, an enigmatic and malevolent nonhuman species that inflicted a night lasting a generation and a winter lasting decades. After the Others were pushed back, the Children and the First Men raised the Wall, a vast barrier of stone, ice and magic from one coast of northern Westeros to the other, to bar the passage of the Others south.

=== A Game of Thrones ===
As A Game of Thrones (1996) begins, the general belief across Westeros is that the Others are a legend to scare children, or else "gone eight thousand years". But the Others have re-emerged and are gaining power—and creating wights—beyond the Wall. In the prologue, a ranging party from the Night's Watch comes face-to-face with a group of the Others, who kill Ser Waymar Royce. Reanimated as a wight, he then kills the ranger Will. Out ranging beyond the Wall, Jon Snow and the Night's Watch find the corpses of two of their fallen brothers. Brought home to Castle Black, the dead men rise and kill several of their living fellows before they are destroyed.

=== A Storm of Swords ===
Sam Tarly kills an Other with a dragonglass dagger in A Storm of Swords (2000). His former comrade Small Paul is killed and reanimated as a wight. The undead Paul is immune to dragonglass, but Sam is able to put him down with fire. Bran Stark recalls the story of the Night's King, a Stark and the 13th Lord Commander of the Night's Watch who had been seduced by a female White Walker. The Night's King and his queen enslaved the brothers of the Watch until the Starks and the wildlings joined forces to defeat him.

=== The Winds of Winter ===
Martin said in 2012 that readers will see more of the Others in his forthcoming novel, The Winds of Winter. He noted in a 2012 Dose interview, "[We'll learn more about their] history, certainly, but I don't know about culture [...] I don't know if they have a culture".

== TV adaptations ==
The White Walkers portrayed on HBO's Game of Thrones differ slightly in appearance from their literary counterparts, but Aaron Souppouris of The Verge named them among "the most visually iconic creatures on the show". In the TV series, the primary White Walker has been portrayed by Ross Mullan. The show calls them "White Walkers", a term used occasionally in the novels, to avoid confusing "the Others" and "others" in speech.

Their apparent leader is the Night King, portrayed by Richard Brake and Vladimir Furdik, who first appeared in the episode "Oathkeeper", in which he places his hand on Craster's baby son, transforming him into a White Walker. In "Hardhome", the effectiveness of Valyrian steel against the White Walkers is proven as Jon shatters one to pieces with a single stroke of his ancient sword Longclaw. Unlike in the novels, the TV series has established that wights can be destroyed by dragonglass.

In the season 6 episode "The Door" (May 2016), Bran Stark experiences a vision of the creation of the Night King by Leaf, one of the Children of the Forest, by stabbing a human prisoner in the chest with an ice dagger. Leaf explains to an incredulous Bran that the Children were at war with the First Men at the time of the Night King's creation. In season 7, when Jon kills a White Walker, the wights under its control are also destroyed. The Night King kills Daenerys Targaryen's dragon Viserion in the seventh season episode "Beyond the Wall", and then reanimates him as a wight. In the season finale episode "The Dragon and the Wolf", the Night King uses the dragon to breach the Wall.

In the eighth season premiere, "Winterfell", a group of survivors from the Wall's destruction discovers that Last Hearth, the home of House Umber, has been attacked by the Army of the Dead in their conquest of the North, with all of its inhabitants killed. The Night King has also left a message in the form of the deceased Ned Umber impaled on a wall and surrounded by a spiral of severed limbs. In the second episode "A Knight of the Seven Kingdoms", the inhabitants of Winterfell make plans for defending the castle against the Army of the Dead. Bran states that the Night King is seeking an "endless night", as he plans to cleanse the world of all life and memory and intends to kill Bran as a major step towards this goal. The White Walkers are later seen viewing Winterfell from a distance as the living prepare to fight them.

In the third episode, "The Long Night", the Army of the Dead marches on Winterfell and nearly wipes out the combined armies of the living. The Night King eventually reaches the Godswood, kills Theon Greyjoy, and prepares to strike down Bran. However, the Night King is ambushed and killed by Arya Stark with the Valyrian steel dagger that Bran had previously given her ("The Spoils of War"), which causes both him and the other White Walkers to shatter and results in the complete obliteration of the Army of the Dead.

In House of the Dragon, the TV adaptation of Fire & Blood, it is revealed in the first episode "The Heirs of the Dragon" (August 2022) that Aegon the Conqueror was inspired to unify Westeros by a dream in which he saw the end of the world of the living coming from the cold northernmost reaches of the continent. Daemon Targaryen has a vision of a White Walker in the episode "The Queen Who Ever Was" (August 2024).

=== Merchandising ===
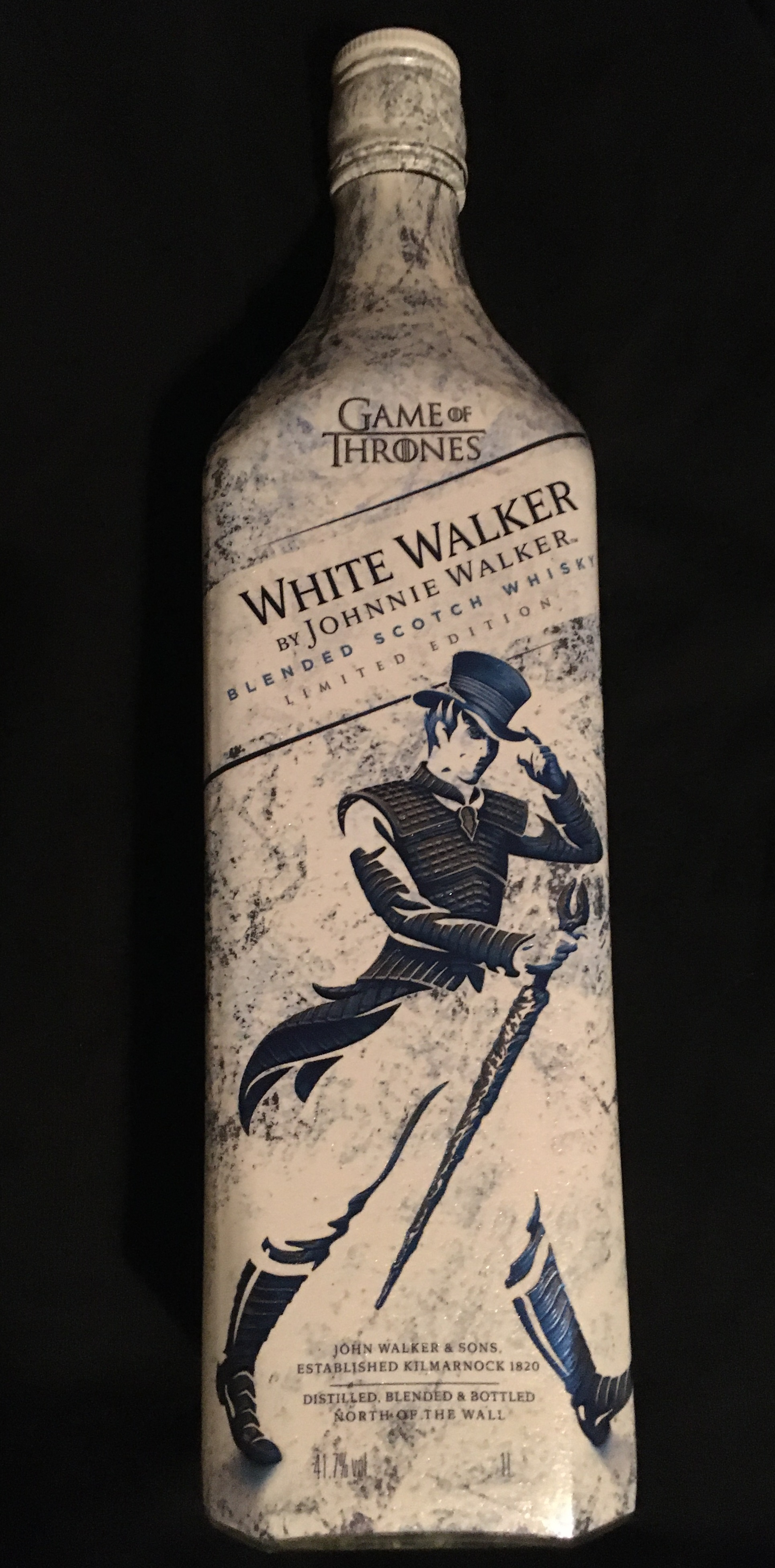
White Walker whisky

In 2012, Funko released a White Walker figure as part of their POP! Television line, which consists of 4.5-inch vinyl figures in the Japanese super deformed style. The company later produced a Mystery Mini Blind Box figurine of a stylized White Walker. Dark Horse released a 9-inch White Walker bust statue in 2013, and later a 9-inch full figure statue. In 2014, Funko released a 6.5 inch articulated White Walker action figure (with spear accessory) as part of their HBO-licensed Legacy Collection line, which features "some of the series’ most popular characters". In 2018, Johnnie Walker released White Walker, the first of several Game of Thrones-inspired whiskies.

== See also ==
- Themes in A Song of Ice and Fire
