= A Clash of Kings =

1998 novel by George R. R. Martin

- US hardcover (first edition)
- Author: George R. R. Martin
- Audio read by: Roy Dotrice
- Cover artist: Steve Youll
- Language: English
- Series: A Song of Ice and Fire
- Release number: 2
- Genre: Epic fantasy, Political novel
- Published: November 16, 1998 (Voyager Books/UK); February 2, 1999 (Bantam Spectra/US)
- Publication place: United States
- Pages: 761
- Award: Locus Award for Best Fantasy Novel (1999)
- ISBN: 0-00-224585-X (UK Hardback); ISBN 0-553-10803-4 (US hardback)
- OCLC: 59667381
- Dewey Decimal: 813/.54
- LC Class: PS3563.A7239 C58 1999
- Preceded by: A Game of Thrones
- Followed by: A Storm of Swords

A Clash of Kings is the second of seven planned novels in A Song of Ice and Fire by American author George R. R. Martin, an epic fantasy series. It was first published in the United Kingdom on November 16, 1998; the first United States edition followed on February 2, 1999. Like its predecessor, A Game of Thrones, it won the Locus Award (in 1999) for Best Novel and was nominated for the Nebula Award (also in 1999) for Best Novel. In May 2005, Meisha Merlin released a limited edition of the novel, fully illustrated by John Howe.

The novel has been adapted for television as the second season of the HBO series Game of Thrones.

A Clash of Kings is also the name of the first expansion to the Game of Thrones board game.

== Plot ==
A Clash of Kings depicts the Seven Kingdoms of Westeros in civil war, while the Night's Watch mounts a reconnaissance mission to investigate the mysterious people known as wildlings. Meanwhile, Daenerys Targaryen continues her plan to conquer the Seven Kingdoms.

=== In the Seven Kingdoms ===
With King Robert Baratheon dead, his purported son Joffrey sits on the Iron Throne. His reign is far from stable, as both of Robert's brothers, Renly and Stannis Baratheon, have claimed the throne as well. Two regions attempt to secede from the realm: Robb Stark is declared "King in the North", while Balon Greyjoy declares himself King of the Iron Islands. The war among these contenders is dubbed the War of Five Kings.

Stannis Baratheon, publicizing the claim that Joffrey and his siblings are bastards, claims the throne as Robert's eldest brother and therefore heir. He is supported by Melisandre, a foreign priestess of R'hllor who believes Stannis is a savior figure prophesied by her religion. Renly is supported by the wealthy Lord Mace Tyrell, and has married Mace's daughter, Margaery. Robb's mother, Catelyn Stark, meets with Renly and Stannis to discuss an alliance against Joffrey's family, the Lannisters, but she is unable to reach an agreement with them. Melisandre uses magic to send a shadow to assassinate Renly in the middle of the night, and Stannis besieges Storm's End, Renly's castle; after witnessing Renly's death, Catelyn and Renly's bodyguard, Brienne of Tarth, flee the scene.

Tyrion Lannister, Joffrey's uncle, arrives at the capital city of King's Landing as acting Hand of the King, the senior adviser to Joffrey's reign. Tyrion improves the defenses of the city while jockeying for power against his sister (Joffrey's mother), Queen Regent Cersei. Learning of Renly's death, Tyrion sends the crown's treasurer, Petyr "Littlefinger" Baelish, to win the Tyrells' support for Joffrey. Catelyn's daughter Sansa, a hostage of the Lannisters, is regularly abused by Joffrey. Riots break out in the city due to Joffrey's cruelty and food shortages caused by the ongoing war.

Robb wins several victories against the Lannisters, while his younger brother Bran rules the Northern stronghold of Winterfell in his absence. Against Catelyn's advice, Robb sends his friend Theon Greyjoy, Balon Greyjoy's son, to negotiate an alliance between the North and the Iron Islands. Theon betrays Robb and attacks Winterfell, taking the castle and capturing Bran and the youngest Stark, Rickon. When Bran and Rickon escape, Theon fakes their deaths. Stark supporters besiege the castle, including a force from the Starks' sometime ally House Bolton. However, the Bolton soldiers turn against both the Stark and Greyjoy forces, set Winterfell ablaze, slaughter its inhabitants, and take Theon prisoner.

Catelyn's daughter Arya is taken north, posing as a recruit for the Night's Watch. The recruits are attacked by Lannister forces, and the survivors are taken to the gigantic castle of Harrenhal, which is controlled by Joffrey's grandfather, Tywin Lannister. For saving his life during the attack, a mysterious man named Jaqen H'ghar promises to repay Arya by killing three men of her choice. Arya leverages this offer to help Northern forces retake control of Harrenhal. Jaqen gives Arya a mysterious iron coin and tells her to find him in the foreign city of Braavos if she should ever desire to learn his secrets. Arya soon escapes the castle.

Stannis's army launches an amphibious assault on King's Landing in a battle on Blackwater Bay. Under Tyrion's command, the Lannister forces use "wildfire" (a substance similar to Greek fire) to ignite the bay, and raise a massive chain across its mouth to prevent Stannis's fleet from retreating. When Stannis's troops storm the gates, it falls to Tyrion to lead the Lannister troops into battle. Stannis's victory seems to be assured until Tywin Lannister arrives with his army and the Tyrell forces, defeating Stannis. During the battle, Tyrion is attacked and injured by a knight of Joffrey's Kingsguard; by the time Tyrion regains consciousness after the battle, Tywin has assumed the post of Hand of the King.

=== Beyond the Wall ===
A scouting party from the Night's Watch learns that the wildlings are uniting under "King-beyond-the-Wall" Mance Rayder. Lord Commander of the Watch Jeor Mormont assigns Jon Snow to a group sent to investigate Rayder's aims, led by Qhorin Halfhand. Hunted by wildling warriors and facing certain defeat, Halfhand commands Jon to infiltrate the wildlings and learn their plans. To win the wildlings' trust, Jon is forced to kill Qhorin. He learns that Mance Rayder is advancing towards the Wall that separates the wildlings from the Seven Kingdoms with an army of thirty thousand wildlings, giants, and mammoths.

=== Across the Narrow Sea ===
Daenerys Targaryen travels south, accompanied by the knight Jorah Mormont, her remaining followers, and three newly hatched dragons. At the city of Qarth, Daenerys's dragons make her notorious. Xaro Xhoan Daxos, a prominent trader in Qarth, initially befriends her, but Daenerys cannot secure aid because she refuses to give away any of her dragons. As a last resort, Daenerys seeks counsel from the warlocks of Qarth, who show Daenerys many confusing visions and threaten her life, whereupon one of Daenerys's dragons burns down the warlocks' House of the Undying. An attempt to assassinate Daenerys is thwarted by a warrior named Strong Belwas and his squire, Arstan Whitebeard: agents of Daenerys's ally Illyrio Mopatis, who have come to escort her back to Pentos.

== Characters ==
The tale is told through the eyes of 9 recurring POV characters plus one prologue POV character:

- Prologue: Maester Cressen, maester at Dragonstone.
- Tyrion Lannister, youngest son of Lord Tywin Lannister, a dwarf and a brother to Queen Cersei, and the acting Hand of the King to Joffrey Baratheon.
- Lady Catelyn Stark, of House Tully, widow of Eddard Stark, Lord of Winterfell.
- Ser Davos Seaworth, a smuggler turned knight in the service of King Stannis Baratheon, often called the Onion Knight.
- Sansa Stark, eldest daughter of Eddard Stark and Catelyn Stark, held captive by King Joffrey in King's Landing.
- Arya Stark, youngest daughter of Eddard Stark and Catelyn Stark, missing and presumed dead.
- Bran Stark, second son of Eddard Stark and Catelyn Stark, ruling in Winterfell in his elder brother’s absence.
- Jon Snow, bastard son of Eddard Stark, and a man of the Night's Watch.
- Theon Greyjoy, heir to the Seastone Chair and former ward of Lord Eddard Stark.
- Queen Daenerys Targaryen, the Unburnt and Mother of Dragons, of the Targaryen dynasty.

== Television adaptation ==
A Clash of Kings has been adapted for television by HBO as the second season of its successful adaptation of A Song of Ice and Fire. Filming began July 2011, and the first episode of season 2 of Game of Thrones aired on April 1, 2012.

== Reception ==
As with its predecessor, A Clash of Kings was positively received by critics. Dorman Shindler of The Dallas Morning News described it as "one of the best [works] in this particular subgenre", praising "the richness of this invented world and its cultures ... [that] lends Mr. Martin's novels the feeling of medieval history rather than fiction." Writing in The San Diego Union-Tribune, Jim Hopper called A Clash of Kings "High Fantasy with a vengeance" and commented: "I'll admit to staying up too late one night last week to finish off this big book, and I hope it's not too terribly long until the next one comes out." Danielle Pilon wrote in the Winnipeg Free Press that the book "shows no signs of the usual 'middle book' aimlessness". Although she found the constantly switching viewpoints "momentarily confusing", she felt that it "draws the reader deep into the labyrinthine political and military intrigues and evokes sympathy for characters on all sides of the conflict." Bradley H. Sinor of the Tulsa World praised Martin for "keep[ing] readers balanced on a sword's edge" and managing to do "three important things" with A Clash of Kings: "It grips the reader whether or not they read the earlier book, tells a satisfying story and leaves the reader wanting the next book as soon as possible." The Oregonian's Steve Perry called the book "easily as good as the first novel" and commented that the Song of Ice and Fire books were "so complex, fascinating and well-rendered that readers will almost certainly be hooked into the whole series." However, he cautioned that "if it were a movie, it would be rated "R" for sex and violence, so don't pick the book up for your 10-year-old nephew who likes Conan."

== Awards and nominations ==
- Locus Award – Best Novel (Fantasy) (Won) – (1999)
- Nebula Award – Best Novel (Nominated) – (1999)
- Ignotus Award – Best Novel (Foreign) (Won) – (2004)
