= Robb Stark =

Character in A Song of Ice and Fire

- A Song of Ice and Fire character Game of Thrones character
- Richard Madden as Robb Stark
- First appearance: Literature: A Game of Thrones (1996); Television: "Winter Is Coming" (2011)
- Last appearance: Literature: A Storm of Swords (2000); Television: "The Rains of Castamere" (2013)
- Created by: George R. R. Martin
- Based on: Edward IV
- Adapted by: D.B. Weiss and David Benioff (Game of Thrones)
- Portrayed by: Richard Madden

In-universe information
- Aliases: The Young Wolf; Novels: Robb the Lord; The Wolfling; The Pup; The Boy Wolf; Television: The Wolf Pup
- Gender: Male
- Titles: Lord of Winterfell; King in the North; Novels: King of the Trident
- Occupation: Military commander
- Family: House Stark
- Spouses: Novels: Jeyne Westerling; Television: Talisa Maegyr
- Relatives: Eddard Stark (father); Catelyn Tully (mother); Sansa Stark (sister); Arya Stark (sister); Bran Stark (brother); Rickon Stark (brother); Theon Greyjoy (foster brother); Rickard Stark (grandfather); Lyarra Stark (grandmother); Brandon Stark (uncle); Lyanna Stark (aunt); Benjen Stark (uncle); Hoster Tully (grandfather); Minisa Whent (grandmother); Lysa Tully (aunt); Edmure Tully (uncle); Brynden Tully (granduncle); Robert Arryn (cousin); Novels: Jon Snow (half-brother); Television: Jon Snow (cousin/adoptive brother)

Robb Stark, also known by his epithet the Young Wolf, is a fictional character in the A Song of Ice and Fire series of epic fantasy novels by American author George R. R. Martin and its HBO television adaptation Game of Thrones, in which he is portrayed by Richard Madden.

Introduced in A Game of Thrones (1996), Robb is the eldest son and heir of Lord Eddard Stark of Winterfell and Lady Catelyn Stark. He subsequently appeared in Martin's A Clash of Kings (1998) and A Storm of Swords (2000). After his father is executed on the order of King Joffrey Baratheon, Robb is crowned King in the North by his bannermen and wages a war against the Iron Throne. Robb's subsequent betrayal and murder at an event known as the Red Wedding shocked both book readers and television audiences alike.

== Character ==
=== Description ===
At the beginning of A Game of Thrones, Robb Stark is 14 years of age (increased to 17 in the TV series). As the oldest legitimate son of Eddard Stark and his wife, Catelyn (née Tully), Robb is raised as the heir to the ancient House Stark of Winterfell, which holds dominion over the North, one of the Seven Kingdoms of Westeros. Trained by Winterfell's master-at-arms Ser Rodrik Cassel, Robb is a talented rider, swordsman, and lancer. He has five siblings: younger sisters Sansa and Arya, younger brothers Bran and Rickon, and a bastard half-brother, Jon Snow. He is also a close friend to Eddard's ward, Theon Greyjoy. Robb is accompanied by his direwolf, Grey Wind. Like most of his siblings, Robb favors his mother's House Tully features over those of House Stark. He is strong and fast with a stocky build, blue eyes, and thick auburn hair.

=== Development, overview and reception ===
James Poniewozik of Time describes Robb as less eager to seek retaliation than his father Eddard but as more pragmatic. Poniewozik's overview of the television version of Robb focuses on his role as a foil for Eddard:

Robb has risen to take his father's place, as a lord of Winterfell and as a focal character in the show. We never saw what kind of warrior Ned was in the field, but in King's Landing, he fought a straight-ahead battle, telegraphing his moves, and died for it. Robb, seeing the Lannisters' numbers, shows himself capable of feints and deceptions—albeit at the cost of 2,000 men and the guilt of having sent them on a suicide mission.

In the third novel, A Storm of Swords, Robb is assassinated in an event called the Red Wedding, which was inspired by the Black Dinner and Glencoe Massacre from Scottish history. Martin has said that he decided to kill Robb Stark because he wished to keep the story difficult to predict: "I killed Ned because everybody thinks he's the hero ... The next predictable thing is to think his eldest son is going to rise up and avenge his father. And everybody is going to expect that. So immediately [killing Robb] became the next thing I had to do."

In their 2015 book Game of Thrones and Business, Tim Phillips and Rebecca Claire agree:

The Internet-crashing shock wasn't fundamentally about death. There's loads of that on TV. What really made this stand out was that it broke the rules – the story just wasn't supposed to go this way. We'd invested in the revenge story of Robb Stark and his family who, in Hollywood narrative terms, should clearly win the war against the Lannisters because that's the way things are done in fairy stories.

Richard Madden has received positive reviews for his role as Robb Stark in the TV series.

== Storylines ==
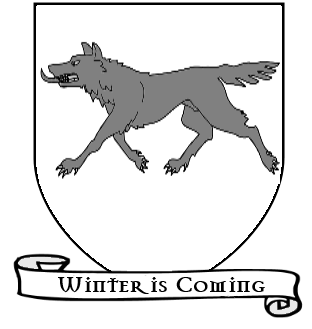
Coat of arms of House Stark

=== Novels ===
Robb is not a point-of-view character in the novels and is mostly a background character. His actions are mainly witnessed and interpreted through the eyes of his brother Bran and mother, Catelyn, as well as via memories of Jon Snow and Theon Greyjoy.

==== A Game of Thrones ====
When his father departs for King's Landing to serve as the Hand of the King for Robert Baratheon, Robb becomes the acting lord of Winterfell. Following his father's arrest for presumed treason, he calls his banners and marches south with an assembled Northern army in an attempt to free his father. Additionally, Robb seeks to relieve the besieged Riverlands, the dominion of House Tully, which has fallen under attack by the forces of House Lannister after his mother imprisoned Lord Tyrion Lannister for the suspected attempted murder of Bran Stark.

To secure safe passage at the vital crossing of the Twins, Robb consents to marrying one of Lord Walder Frey's daughters or granddaughters as negotiated by his mother. After crossing the river, he surprises and destroys the Lannister army besieging Riverrun, capturing Ser Jaime Lannister during the Battle of Whispering Wood. Upon hearing of his father's execution on the orders of now-King Joffrey Baratheon, Robb is crowned the King in the North and King of the Trident by his bannermen.

==== A Clash of Kings ====
Robb continues to win crushing victories against Lord Tywin Lannister's armies, and earns the nickname The Young Wolf for his ferocity in battle. With the War of the Five Kings raging, he sends his mother to negotiate an alliance with King Renly Baratheon, but Renly is assassinated by his surviving brother, King Stannis Baratheon, with blood magic by the priestess of R'hllor, Melisandre. Robb invades the Westerlands in order to strategically assist Stannis's campaign against the Iron Throne. He also sends Theon Greyjoy to Pyke to broker an alliance with Theon's father, Lord Balon Greyjoy, ruler of the Iron Islands. However, Balon declares himself king and decides to invade the North instead. Theon betrays Robb, seizing Winterfell by surprise. Theon is believed to have murdered Robb's youngest brothers, Bran and Rickon; in reality, they escaped and went into hiding.

==== A Storm of Swords ====
During an assault in the Westerlands, Robb is wounded and learns of the apparent deaths of his brothers at the hands of his closest friend. Falling ill from mourning and injury, he is cared for by Lady Jeyne Westerling and takes her maidenhood. To preserve Jeyne's honor, Robb marries her, rescinding his previous marriage arrangement with House Frey, causing them to desert his army.

Following King Stannis's defeat at the Battle of the Blackwater, Robb withdraws from the Westerlands and returns to Riverrun to attend the funeral of his grandfather, Lord Hoster Tully. Robb learns that his mother has secretly released Jaime Lannister as an exchange for her daughter Sansa, who remains a hostage in King's Landing. This leads to the mutiny of Lord Rickard Karstark, whose two sons were slain by Jaime, forcing Robb to execute Rickard and subsequently lose House Karstark's support. With his army dwindling, Robb tries to repair the alliance with the Freys by bargaining his uncle Edmure Tully to marry Lady Roslin Frey. The Freys demand that Robb personally attend the wedding at the Twins as an apology.

Robb learns that King Balon Greyjoy has died, and he decides to lead his army to retake the North immediately after the wedding is complete. He soon learns that his sister Sansa has been forcibly married to Tyrion Lannister. To prevent the Lannisters from claiming Winterfell through Sansa's child by Tyrion, Robb, against the opposition of his mother, disinherits Sansa and signs a decree legitimizing his bastard half-brother, Jon Snow, as his heir if he happens to die with no children, and requests the Night's Watch release Jon from service. Robb then entrusts the decree to Lord Galbart Glover and Lady Maege Mormont, sending them to make contact with Lord Howland Reed so that he can launch a coordinated attack to recapture the strategically crucial Moat Cailin.

At the Twins, the Northern convoy, which is treated with bread and salt (and thus promised guest rights and safety), is betrayed and massacred by House Frey and House Bolton during the wedding feast in an event orchestrated by Tywin Lannister known as the Red Wedding. Robb is shot by crossbow bolts multiple times and then personally murdered by his chief vassal, Lord Roose Bolton, who has secretly defected in exchange for House Bolton gaining dominion over the North from House Stark. After his death, the Freys mutilate Robb's body by sewing the head of his dead direwolf, Grey Wind, onto his decapitated corpse. His mother, as well as his entire army (save for the Boltons and Freys, a few soldiers who managed to escape), are also murdered.

=== Television adaptation ===
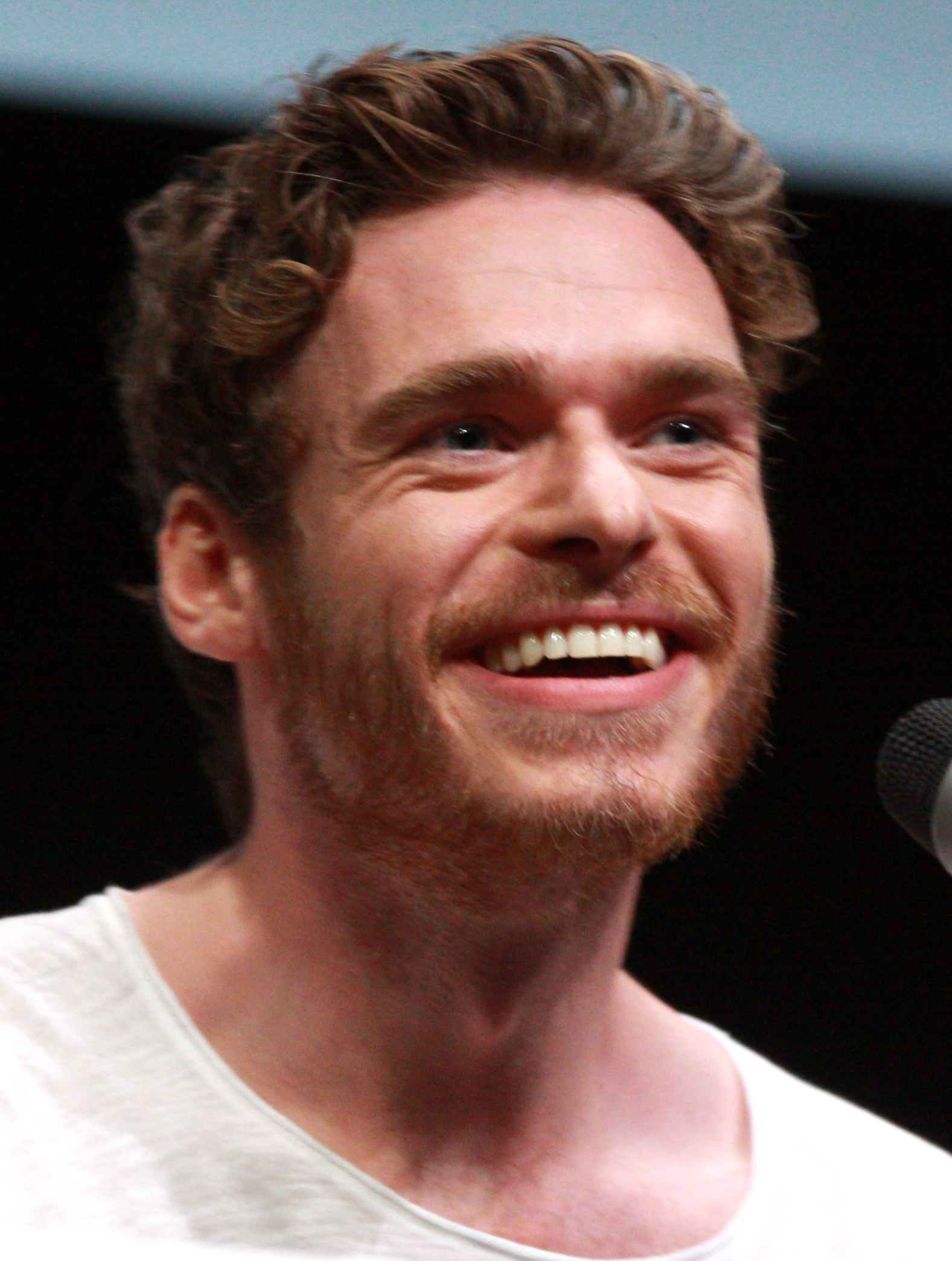
Richard Madden plays the role of Robb Stark in the television series.

Richard Madden portrays Robb Stark in the television adaption of the series. There are some slight differences between Robb's TV portrayal and the book version. Robb's age changes from 14 to 17 at the start of the series. Instead of marrying Jeyne Westerling, he marries a healer from Volantis named Talisa Maegyr. Robb is not a point-of-view character in the books, but he is given a much larger role in the TV series.

James Poniewozik comments in TIME on Madden's performance in "The Pointy End": "Both the script and Richard Madden show in deft, quick strokes how the crisis focuses him. (This is another case where having a live actor does a better job of showing a transition that seemed more abrupt in the book.)"

Madden said that he learned that the character would be killed off early on but otherwise read the books season by season, focusing primarily on the scripts: "I'm, as an actor, forced to bend the path I put Robb on and change it and keep the surprises coming. Hopefully, I managed to do that."

==== Season 1 ====
Robb is the eldest son of Lord Eddard and Lady Catelyn Stark. When King Robert Baratheon summons Eddard to King's Landing to serve as Hand of the King, Robb becomes the acting lord of Winterfell. After his father is arrested for apparent treason, Robb summons the Northern bannermen and assembles an army of 20,000 in an effort to rescue his father and aid the Riverlands, which have come under attack by the armies of House Lannister. Catelyn brokers an alliance between the North and House Frey when Robb consents to marrying one of Lord Walder Frey's daughters, allowing the Stark army to strategically cross the river at the Twins and launch a surprise engagement against the Lannisters, successfully capturing Ser Jaime Lannister in the process. After the death of King Robert and the execution of Eddard Stark on the orders of King Joffrey Baratheon, a bastard born of incest between twins Jaime and Cersei Lannister, the Northern and Riverland lords declare their independence from the Iron Throne and proclaim Robb as the King in the North.

==== Season 2 ====
Robb proves to be a skillful military commander, and he wins a succession of battles against Lord Tywin Lannister's forces, earning him the nickname "The Young Wolf". He sends his closest friend, Lord Theon Greyjoy, to the Iron Islands to broker an alliance with Lord Balon Greyjoy, Theon's father. In exchange for Greyjoy support and the use of their naval fleet, Robb intends to recognize the Iron Islands' independence. Robb also sends his mother to parley with Renly Baratheon, who has declared himself king and has amassed an army of 100,000. However, Stannis Baratheon, having also declared himself king via the lawful line of succession, prepares to engage Renly. Catelyn is successful in brokering an alliance with Renly, but he is assassinated by Stannis using blood magic. Theon fails to convince his father to ally with Robb, and instead Balon declares himself king and launches an invasion of the North. Theon decides to capture Winterfell to earn his father's favor. Robb offers amnesty to the Ironborn invaders on the condition that they hand over Theon. Robb soon meets and falls in love with Talisa Maegyr, a foreign healer from Volantis.

Stannis assaults King's Landing at the Battle of Blackwater Bay and is defeated when Tywin, joined by the armies of House Tyrell via a newly brokered alliance, arrives and stops the city from being sacked. While Robb travels to the Crag to negotiate a surrender, Jaime escapes and kills the son of Lord Rickard Karstark before he is recaptured. Catelyn stops Rickard from killing Jaime, but discontent within the Stark army begins to grow. Additionally, despite his mother's protest, Robb breaks his engagement with the Freys and marries Talisa. As a result, the Freys abandon the Stark army.

==== Season 3 ====
Believing Jaime to be her only chance of seeing her daughters again, Catelyn frees him and commands Brienne of Tarth to bring him to King's Landing in exchange for Sansa Stark. Furious, Robb has his mother imprisoned. He leads his army to capture Harrenhal but finds that hundreds of his imprisoned bannermen have been slaughtered. Upon learning of the death of his grandfather, Lord Hoster Tully, Robb returns to Riverrun for the funeral. Robb's uncle and the new Lord of Riverrun, Edmure Tully, is scolded by Robb for previously disobeying a command when he attacked Ser Gregor Clegane's forces. While at Riverrun, Robb executes Rickard Karstark after he murders two teenage Lannister squires. As a result, the Karstarks abandon his army. To regain an alliance with the Freys and bolster his army, Robb arranges for the reluctant Edmure to marry one of Walder Frey's daughters. With the advisement of his mother, Robb prepares to invade Casterly Rock, the domain of House Lannister.

At the Twins, Walder Frey provides guest right to Robb, his family, and bannermen. The wedding commences, but Walder betrays Robb in an event secretly orchestrated by Tywin Lannister, Walder, and Lord Roose Bolton. Talisa, pregnant with Robb's child, is stabbed in the stomach and killed. Robb's entire army (save for the Boltons and Freys) is murdered. Robb himself is shot with multiple crossbow bolts, taunted by Walder, and subsequently executed by Roose with a knife to the heart. Catelyn kills Walder's wife, but she too is executed when her throat is slit. Robb's corpse is decapitated, his direwolf Grey Wind's head is sewn on in its place, and the corpse is then paraded around as the Stark forces are slaughtered. Robb's great-uncle, Ser Brynden Tully, escapes, but Edmure is held captive, and Walder becomes Lord of Riverrun. Roose once again swears fealty to the Iron Throne and is granted the title of Warden of the North. This event comes to be known as the Red Wedding.

==== Legacy ====
House Lannister strips House Stark of all lands and titles after Robb's failed rebellion against the Iron Throne. The Boltons recapture Winterfell from Theon, expel the Ironborn from the North, and begin to rule with an iron fist. Sansa is forced to marry Roose's legitimized bastard, Lord Ramsay Bolton. Tywin and Roose are later both killed by their own sons. The remnants of Robb's army, now led by Brynden Tully, recapture Riverrun and hold it until Jaime Lannister retakes it and Brynden is killed. Years later, Arya Stark returns to Westeros, murders Walder Frey and his sons, and poisons all of his male descendants, ultimately exterminating House Frey. Sansa escapes from the Boltons, and she and Jon Snow successfully destroy House Bolton and retake Winterfell. Jon is crowned the King in the North, restoring Stark rule in the process. With the arrival of Queen Daenerys Targaryen, Jon declares fealty and becomes Warden of the North. However, following her death and Jon's banishment, the North is permitted by the newly appointed King Bran Stark to regain its independence, and the Northern lords declare Sansa the Queen in the North.

== In other media ==
In his article "The War in Westeros and Just War Theory", Richard H. Corrigan uses Robb to illustrate the concepts of just cause and right intention in the decision to go to war: "Robb is not only fighting this war to ensure that his fellow Northerners have a just king [Robb's cause]. He is also doing it to avenge his father, Ned, and to recover his sisters Arya and Sansa [Robb's intention]." Corrigan speculates that Robb may be suffering from cognitive dissonance and says that, ethically, once Robb has achieved his cause, he is obligated to cease fighting even if he has not yet avenged his family.

Robb's decision to renege on his promise to marry one of Walder Frey's daughters features heavily in the fifth chapter of Tim Phillips and Rebecca Clare's Game of Thrones and Business, "Keep Your Word: Robb Stark discovers too late the dangers of broken promises in business deals."

== Family tree of House Stark ==
Descendants of Rickard Stark

Rickard | Lyarra
Brandon | Catelyn; Tully | Eddard | Lyanna (Note: In season 7 of the TV series Game of Thrones, Jon is revealed to be the son of Rhaegar Targaryen and Lyanna.) | Benjen
Robb | Jeyne; Westerling | Sansa | Tyrion; Lannister | Arya | Brandon | Rickon | Jon; Snow

Notes:

Rickard Stark
