= Sons of the Harpy =

- Game of Thrones episode
- Episode no.: Season 5 Episode 4
- Directed by: Mark Mylod
- Written by: Dave Hill
- Cinematography by: Anette Haellmigk
- Editing by: Tim Porter
- Original air date: May 3, 2015
- Running time: 50 minutes

Guest appearances
- Jonathan Pryce as High Sparrow; Ian McElhinney as Ser Barristan Selmy; Julian Glover as Grand Maester Pycelle; Anton Lesser as Qyburn; Tara Fitzgerald as Selyse Baratheon; Roger Ashton-Griffiths as Mace Tyrell; Jacob Anderson as Grey Worm; Ian Beattie as Ser Meryn Trant; Joel Fry as Hizdahr zo Loraq; Eugene Simon as Lancel Lannister; Ben Crompton as Edd Tollett; Keisha Castle-Hughes as Obara Sand; Rosabell Laurenti Sellers as Tyene Sand; Jessica Henwick as Nymeria Sand; Kerry Ingram as Shireen Baratheon; Brenock O'Connor as Olly; Finn Jones as Loras Tyrell; Will Tudor as Olyvar

Episode chronology
| ← Previous "High Sparrow" | Next → "Kill the Boy" |
- Game of Thrones season 5

"Sons of the Harpy" is the fourth episode of the fifth season of HBO's fantasy television series Game of Thrones, and the 44th overall. The episode was written by Dave Hill, and directed by Mark Mylod. It aired on May 3, 2015. Prior to airing, this episode was leaked online along with the first three episodes of the season.

The episode received a nomination for a Primetime Emmy Award for Outstanding Cinematography for a Single-Camera Series at the 67th Primetime Creative Arts Emmy Awards. The episode was met with generally positive reviews, praising the action and character development, but received heavy criticism for the decision to kill off Ser Barristan Selmy, who in the novels is still alive and is a major supporting character.

== Plot ==
=== At the Wall ===
Jon Snow sends letters to various nobles requesting men for the Night's Watch, including, to his chagrin, Roose Bolton. Melisandre attempts to entice Jon to join Stannis Baratheon in taking Winterfell from the Boltons, but he declines. As she departs, Melisandre repeats Ygritte's saying and final words to Jon: "You know nothing, Jon Snow."

Shireen questions Stannis about whether he feels shame about her deformity caused by the "greyscale" disease. Stannis remembers how she contracted greyscale and his attempts to heal her rather than exile her, reaffirming her as his daughter.

=== At Winterfell ===
Petyr Baelish informs Sansa Stark that he is leaving Winterfell to return to King's Landing at Cersei Lannister's request. He adds that Stannis will soon take Winterfell from the Boltons and make Sansa Wardeness of the North.

=== In King's Landing ===
Mace Tyrell informs Cersei that the Iron Bank has called in 10% of the Crown's debt and that it can pay only half that amount. Cersei sends Mace to Braavos with Meryn Trant to negotiate a deal. Mace and Meryn leave immediately, prompting Maester Pycelle to state that the Small Council grows smaller and smaller.

Cersei authorizes the "High Sparrow" to revive the Faith Militant, the paramilitary division of the Faith of the Seven. The Faith Militant arrests Loras Tyrell because of his homosexuality. Margaery Tyrell asks King Tommen to order his release, but the Faith Militant prevents Tommen from disturbing the High Sparrow's prayer. Margaery informs Olenna Tyrell of the situation.

=== In Dorne ===
Jaime Lannister and Bronn arrive in Dorne. Jaime tells Bronn that he will kill his brother, Tyrion, for murdering Tywin, their father, if he ever sees him again.

Oberyn Martell's bastard daughters, Obara, Nymeria, and Tyene, known collectively as the "Sand Snakes", learn that Jaime has infiltrated Dorne. They agree to join Ellaria Sand, Oberyn's former partner, in starting a war against the Lannisters by killing Myrcella Baratheon.

=== On the Summer Sea ===
Jorah Mormont sets sail with his captive, Tyrion, who deduces Jorah's identity. Jorah reveals he is taking Tyrion to Daenerys Targaryen.

=== In Meereen ===
Daenerys receives Hizdahr zo Loraq, who repeats his request to reopen the fighting pits, noting that it can unite the masters and freedpeople. Meanwhile, Grey Worm and several "Unsullied" are attacked by the Sons of the Harpy. Barristan Selmy arrives to assist Grey Worm, and they are successful in slaying their attackers before both collapse from their wounds.

== Production ==
=== Writing ===
This episode was the first to be written by staff writer Dave Hill, who previously worked as an assistant to showrunners David Benioff and D. B. Weiss and contains content from two of George R. R. Martin's novels, A Feast for Crows, The Captain of Guards, Cersei IV and Cersei VI, and A Dance with Dragons, chapters Tyrion VII with elements of Jon I, Jon II, Daenerys II and the Epilogue.

Like the season's earlier episodes, "Sons of the Harpy" deviated from George Martin's novels in several places. Hilary Busis and Darren Francich of Entertainment Weekly continued their approval of the decision to consolidate the Sansa and Arya impostor storylines. The scene between Stannis and Shireen was written specifically for the episode. Both Sarah Moran of Screen Rant and Matt Fowler of IGN agreed that interacting with a more visible and vocal Shireen gives Stannis's character some emotional depth, with Moran adding that the change "gives us insight into characters we already know."

Moran also approved of the streamlined story and cast, noting that the show has "whittled down Oberyn Martell's bastard daughters from eight to three" and giving Arianne Martell's plotline to the already-established Ellaria Sand. David Crow of Den of Geek expressed reservations about the scene in which Grey Worm and Barristan Selmy are wounded and left for dead, referring to it as "vainglorious and artificial," but he also said, "Bringing Bronn back into the fold was one of Game of Thrones more astute changes from the books as he offers a great counterbalance to either Lannister brother." Matt Fowler of IGN, however, found the acceleration of the Faith Militant storyline jarring, "like a time-crunch collage."

=== Casting ===
The episode has the introduction of new recurring cast members Keisha Castle-Hughes, Jessica Henwick and Rosabell Laurenti Sellers, who play the Sand Snakes: Obara, Nymeria and Tyene Sand.

== Reception ==
=== Ratings ===
"Sons of the Harpy" was watched by an estimated 6.82 million American viewers during its first airing, and received a 3.6 rating among adults 18–49. In the United Kingdom, the episode was viewed by 2.151 million viewers, making it the highest-rated broadcast that week. It also received 0.164 million timeshift viewers.

=== Critical reception ===
Rotten Tomatoes scored this episode at 100% based on 30 reviews with an average score of 8.1 out of 10, stating "An episode that benefits from the intricate plotting of the previous three, "Sons of the Harpy" balances bloody action with illuminating character interplay."

David Crow of Den of Geek called this the weakest episode of the season so far but still reasonably solid. Eric Kain of Forbes writes, "All told, an excellent episode filled with revelations and surprises, great action and fantastic drama. I’m excited to see the back story begin to emerge in earnest, something I’ve been wondering about for years."
