= Two Swords (Game of Thrones) =

- Game of Thrones episode
- Episode no.: Season 4 Episode 1
- Directed by: D. B. Weiss
- Written by: David Benioff; D. B. Weiss
- Cinematography by: Jonathan Freeman
- Editing by: Katie Weiland
- Original air date: April 6, 2014
- Running time: 58 minutes

Guest appearances
- Diana Rigg as Olenna Tyrell; Pedro Pascal as Oberyn Martell; Indira Varma as Ellaria Sand; Michiel Huisman as Daario Naharis; Ian McElhinney as Ser Barristan Selmy; Peter Vaughan as Maester Aemon; Owen Teale as Alliser Thorne; Anton Lesser as Qyburn; Yuri Kolokolnikov as Styr; Jacob Anderson as Grey Worm; Nathalie Emmanuel as Missandei; Dominic Carter as Janos Slynt; Daniel Portman as Podrick Payne; Ian Beattie as Ser Meryn Trant; Tony Way as Dontos Hollard; Will Tudor as Olyvar; Andy Kellegher as Polliver; Chris Reilly as Morgan; Joseph Gatt as a Thenn Warg; Daniel Rabin as Lord Blackmont; Brian Fortune as Othell Yarwyck; Dez McMahon as Ser Endrew Tarth

Episode chronology
← Previous "Mhysa"	Next → "The Lion and the Rose"
- Game of Thrones season 4

"Two Swords" is the first episode of the fourth season of HBO's medieval fantasy television series Game of Thrones. The fourth season premiere and the 31st episode overall, the episode was written by series co-creators David Benioff and D. B. Weiss, and directed by Weiss. It first premiered on April 6, 2014.

The title of the episode refers to the two swords Tywin Lannister forges from Ice, Ned Stark's large Valyrian steel sword, in the opening sequence. In the episode, Tywin awards one of these swords to Jaime Lannister, who refuses to leave the Kingsguard as Tywin commands. Tyrion Lannister welcomes Prince Oberyn Martell of Dorne to King's Landing ahead of Joffrey Baratheon's royal wedding. Sandor "The Hound" Clegane and Arya Stark stop at an inn on their way to the Vale. Jon Snow is interrogated by the Night's Watch council. Across the Narrow Sea, Daenerys Targaryen marches with her army to Meereen.

The episode received positive reviews from critics, praising the final scene in particular, and achieved a viewership of 6.64 million during its initial airing, setting a new viewership record for HBO. The episode was nominated for Outstanding Cinematography for a Single-Camera Series at the 66th Primetime Creative Arts Emmy Awards, sharing its nomination with the following episode, "The Lion and the Rose".

== Plot ==
=== In King's Landing ===
Tywin reforges House Stark's greatsword, Ice, into two smaller swords. One is given to Jaime, now Lord Commander of the Kingsguard. Tywin wants Jaime to marry and rule from Casterly Rock in his stead, but Jaime refuses, prompting Tywin to disown him. Qyburn gives Jaime a gilded steel hand. Later, Brienne tries to convince Jaime to fulfil his vow to return the Stark girls to safety, but he argues the matter is now complicated by Catelyn's death, Arya's disappearance, and Sansa's marriage to Tyrion.

Tyrion waits to receive the Dornish welcome party at the gates of the city. Prince Oberyn Martell is sent instead of Doran Martell, who remains in Sunspear for his health. Oberyn, whose sister Elia was married to Rhaegar Targaryen and killed by Gregor "The Mountain" Clegane, seeks vengeance for her and her children's deaths.

Shae tries to rekindle her romance with Tyrion, and is observed by another handmaiden, who informs Cersei. Jaime attempts to renew his relationship with Cersei, who rebuffs him, because he "took too long".

Sansa, traumatised by her mother and brother's murder, is approached in the godswood by Ser Dontos Hollard, whose life she had previously saved. Dontos gives her his mother's necklace to wear at Joffrey's wedding as thanks.

=== In Slaver's Bay ===
Daenerys' dragons continue to grow and become more difficult to control. As her army marches on Meereen, Jorah tells her there is one crucified slave child on every mile marker. Daenerys orders them to be taken down, their collars removed and then buried, but only after she has seen the face of every victim.

=== At the Wall ===
Jon is interrogated by the Night's Watch leadership regarding his time with the Wildlings, and the killing of Qhorin Halfhand. Janos Slynt and Alliser Thorne call for Jon to be executed, but Aemon frees him, believing Jon's testimony about the Wildling's forthcoming attack to be truthful.

=== In the North ===
Tormund and Ygritte meet with a group of cannibalistic Thenns, led by Styr, who are roasting the severed arm of a dead Night's Watch member.

=== In the Riverlands ===
Sandor tells Arya that he plans to ransom her to Lysa Arryn in the Vale, her last living relative with money. They stop at an inn, where they come across Gregor's men, including Polliver. A brawl breaks out; Sandor kills most of the soldiers, while Arya reclaims Needle from Polliver and kills him in the same manner he had killed Lommy ("What Is Dead May Never Die").

== Production ==
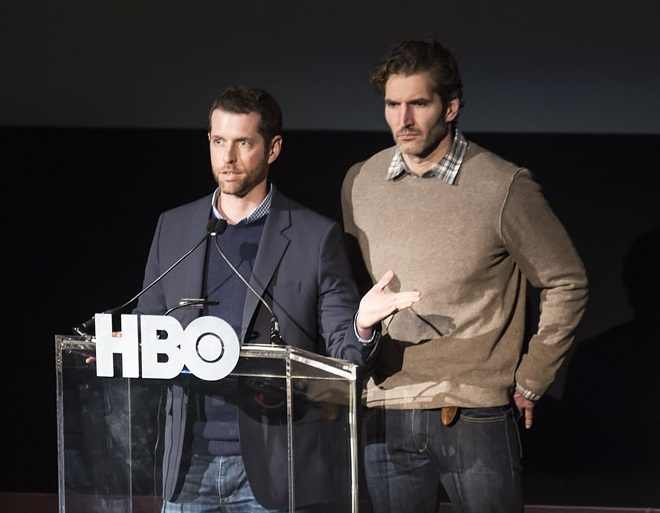
"Two Swords" was written and directed by producers D.B. Weiss and David Benioff.

The episode was directed by the showrunners themselves, although to comply with the rules of the Directors Guild of America only Weiss is credited for directing. They previously co-directed the season three episode "Walk of Punishment", in which Benioff received sole directing credit. "Two Swords" is the third episode of the series to feature a cold open.

=== Writing ===
"Two Swords" was written by executive producers David Benioff and D. B. Weiss, based on George R. R. Martin's original work from his novel A Clash of Kings, chapters Sansa II and Sansa VIII, and A Storm of Swords, chapters Jaime VII, Tyrion V, Tyrion IV, Jon VI, Jon IX, Daenerys V, and Arya XIII. Arya's revenge against Lommy's murderer using the same method of killing was depicted in The Winds of Winter chapter Mercy.

=== Casting ===
With this episode, Gwendoline Christie (Brienne of Tarth) and Kristofer Hivju (Tormund Giantsbane) are promoted to series regulars. The episode has the introduction of new recurring cast members Pedro Pascal (Oberyn Martell) and Indira Varma (Ellaria Sand), while Michiel Huisman replaces Ed Skrein as the recurring character Daario Naharis. Owen Teale (Alliser Thorne), Dominic Carter (Janos Slynt) and Tony Way (Ser Dontos Hollard) make return appearances after an absence of several years (Teale in the first season, Carter and Way in the second).

== Reception ==
=== Television ratings ===
"Two Swords" broke the viewership record for Game of Thrones, which was set by episode six the previous season. 6.64 million people watched the premiere airing, and when coupled with encore airings, that number rose to 8.2 million total viewers. This was at the time HBO's highest ratings for any show since the finale episode of The Sopranos, though it was shortly exceeded. In the UK on Sky Atlantic, "Two Swords" was top in the week with a viewership of 1.21 million.

=== Critical reception ===
The season premiere obtained a 95% rating from 44 reviews with an average score of 9 out of 10 according to Rotten Tomatoes. The consensus reads: "While not particularly eventful, "Two Swords" expertly lays the foundation for the coming excitement of season four with superb writing."

Reviewing it for IGN, Matt Fowler gave the episode a mark of 8.5 out of 10, and wrote that "'Two Swords' was a solid GoT premiere, though it certainly didn't hide the fact that the show, post-Red Wedding, is going to possibly meander more than people might enjoy or expect." Two reviews from The A.V. Club were written, with one intended for those who have read the novels and one for those who have not. Reviewing for the novel readers, Emily VanDerWerff gave the episode an "A−", while Erik Adams, who reviewed for the non-readers, rated the episode a "B+". Myles McNutt at Cultural Learnings also gave the episode a positive review, singling out the final scene with Arya and Sandor as the episode's best sequence.

=== Awards and accolades ===
Year	Award	Category	Nominee(s)	Result	Ref.
2014	Primetime Creative Arts Emmy Awards	Outstanding Cinematography for a Single-Camera Series	Jonathan Freeman	Nominated	
