= Stormborn =

- Game of Thrones episode
- Episode no.: Season 7 Episode 2
- Directed by: Mark Mylod
- Written by: Bryan Cogman
- Cinematography by: P. J. Dillon
- Editing by: Tim Porter
- Original air date: July 23, 2017
- Running time: 58 minutes

Guest appearances
- Diana Rigg as Olenna Tyrell; Jim Broadbent as Archmaester Ebrose; Pilou Asbæk as Euron Greyjoy; Gemma Whelan as Yara Greyjoy; Anton Lesser as Qyburn; Jacob Anderson as Grey Worm; Keisha Castle-Hughes as Obara Sand; Rosabell Laurenti Sellers as Tyene Sand; Jessica Henwick as Nymeria Sand; Hafþór Júlíus Björnsson as Gregor Clegane; Ben Hawkey as Hot Pie; Tim McInnerny as Robett Glover; James Faulkner as Randyll Tarly; Rupert Vansittart as Yohn Royce; Tom Hopper as Dickon Tarly; Bella Ramsey as Lyanna Mormont; Richard Rycroft as Maester Wolkan; Megan Parkinson as Alys Karstark; Harry Grasby as Ned Umber

Episode chronology
← Previous "Dragonstone"	Next → "The Queen's Justice"
- Game of Thrones season 7

"Stormborn" is the second episode of the seventh season of HBO's medieval fantasy television series Game of Thrones, and the 62nd overall. The episode was written by Bryan Cogman and directed by Mark Mylod. It first aired on HBO on July 23, 2017.

The episode's main plot focuses on Daenerys Targaryen planning her conquest of Westeros; at the behest of Melisandre, she orders Tyrion Lannister to summon Jon Snow, who agrees to meet with her despite the objections of Sansa Stark and several other supporters. In King's Landing, Cersei Lannister warns her bannermen about Daenerys's impending invasion. Meanwhile, in the Narrow Sea, the Greyjoys and Sand Snakes are attacked by Euron Greyjoy's Iron Fleet, with Yara Greyjoy and Ellaria Sand being taken as hostages. The title of the episode refers to both Daenerys, who was born during a terrible storm, and Euron, who declares himself to be "the storm". The episode received praise from critics, who considered Euron's raid on Yara's Iron Fleet, the assembly of Daenerys' allies at Dragonstone, and Arya Stark's reunion with her direwolf Nymeria as highlights of the episode. In the United States, it achieved a viewership of 9.27 million in its initial broadcast.

This episode marks the final appearance of Keisha Castle-Hughes (Obara Sand) and Jessica Henwick (Nymeria Sand).

== Plot ==
=== At Dragonstone ===
Daenerys confronts Varys over his previously shifting allegiances. Varys declares he is loyal to the people of the realm, and Daenerys makes him swear to be always honest with her, threatening to burn him alive if he ever betrays her.

Daenerys grants an audience to Melisandre, who urges her to meet Jon Snow. Tyrion vouches for Jon and recommends the Starks as allies. Daenerys instructs Tyrion to summon Jon to bend the knee.

During a war council, Yara Greyjoy and Ellaria Sand support an overwhelming offensive on King's Landing. Unwilling to win the war at the cost of innocent lives, Daenerys instead adopts Tyrion's plan to have her Westerosi allies besiege King's Landing, while the Unsullied will take Casterly Rock. Olenna Tyrell advises Daenerys to trust more in her own instinct than counsel of her advisors.

Before departing to lead his army, Grey Worm reveals to Missandei he never feared before loving her. Missandei is moved by his words and they make love.

=== In Oldtown ===
Archmaester Ebrose tells Sam that Jorah's greyscale is now untreatable, Jorah has about six months of sanity left, and suicide is his only alternative to exile in Valyria. Sam discovers a treatment; Ebrose tells him it is forbidden because it risks transmission, but Sam performs the agonizing procedure in secret.

=== At Winterfell ===
Jon receives Daenerys' message. Sansa and Davos advocate refusal, but Davos notes that dragonglass can stop the undead. After receiving Sam's information about dragonglass on Dragonstone, Jon decides to go, despite uniform opposition from his loyalists. Jon names Sansa as regent, surprising her, and threatens Littlefinger to stop pursuing Sansa when he tries to ingratiate himself with Jon.

=== In the Riverlands ===
Arya goes to an inn where she encounters Hot Pie. After he tells her that Jon has retaken Winterfell, she decides to head north. She's beset by a wolfpack, the leader of the pack being her direwolf Nymeria, whom she drove off years earlier ("The Kingsroad"). Arya invites her north but Nymeria instead leaves her be with Arya stating, “That’s not you.”

=== In King's Landing ===
Cersei appeals to the lords of Westeros, including House Tyrell's former bannermen, for support against Daenerys, who Cersei portrays as a dangerous foreign invader. Jaime offers to make Randyll Tarly Warden of the South if he becomes Jaime's second-in-command. Randyll argues that his house has been always loyal to Olenna and the Tyrells. Qyburn shows Cersei a scorpion, a projectile weapon able to pierce dragon skulls.

=== In the Narrow Sea ===
Euron's fleet attacks Yara's navy. Euron kills Obara and Nymeria Sand; his men abduct Ellaria and Tyene Sand, while he takes Yara prisoner. Theon, triggered by the violence, jumps overboard, abandoning Yara.

== Production ==
=== Writing ===
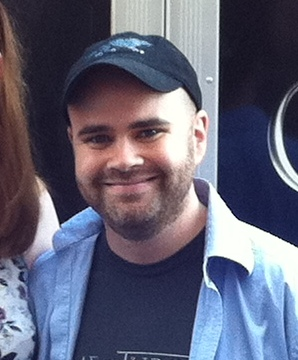
Bryan Cogman wrote the episode.

"Stormborn" was written by Bryan Cogman. Cogman has been a writer for the series since its beginning, previously writing nine other episodes. The title of the episode, "Stormborn", is a reference to Daenerys Targaryen, who was born in the midst of a great storm, earning her that nickname. In the "Inside the Episode" segment published by HBO following the initial airing of the episode, co-creators and executive producers of the series David Benioff and D. B. Weiss were interviewed, saying "We last saw Nymeria when Arya made her run away because she wanted to save Nymeria's life, - She knew Cersei was going to kill her if she found her, and when she finally finds Nymeria again — or Nymeria finds her — she of course wants Nymeria to come back home with her and be her loyal companion again. But Nymeria's found her own life." They continued noting that the line "That's not you" was a direct reference to what she said to Ned Stark back in the first season, when he was telling her that she will be a "lady of a castle and marrying some lord and wearing a nice frilly dress", which Arya responded by saying "That's not me". Weiss continued, "Arya's not domesticated. It makes total sense the wolf wouldn't be either. Once the wolf walks away, at first she's heartbroken to have come this close, but then she realizes the wolf is doing exactly what she would do if she was that wolf."

=== Casting ===
The episode featured the return of Ben Hawkey as Hot Pie, who was last seen in season 4's "Mockingbird". Hawkey spoke about his return to Entertainment Weekly, saying that he did not expect to ever come back. Prior to getting the script and to avoid the return of character to be leaked, the producers gave Hawkey a code name when communicating by email. He continued by saying that the scene was "really nice" and was a "perfect little Hot Pie scene". "Stormborn" was also the last episode for Keisha Castle-Hughes and Jessica Henwick, as Obara and Nymeria Sand were killed. The episode introduced new recurring cast member Tom Hopper as Dickon Tarly, replacing Freddie Stroma, who briefly portrayed the character in Season 6.

=== Filming ===
"Stormborn" was directed by Mark Mylod, his first of two episodes for this season. He joined the series as a director in the fifth season, his first episode being "High Sparrow", which was followed by "Sons of the Harpy". John Bradley spoke about what went into shooting the Jorah Mormont greyscale scene with actor Iain Glen. Before filming Iain had to sit on the prosthetics trailer for around five hours while the make up department "applied these really detailed and intricate greyscale prosthetics, piece by piece." He continued "I was basically peeling the plastic latex prosthetic off of Iain's actual body. He was kind of in a suit - It was the same as pulling away a prosthetic. It was a very, very big technical job for the prosthetics department. There were about five or six guys on set that day that you can't see but were just out of the camera line, there with pumps and buckets of pus."

Nathalie Emmanuel discussed her character's love scene with Grey Worm, saying that the characters have shown "interest in each other", we have seen them "express it for each other, but not really say it - This point is the climax and they physically act upon it", much due to them facing "the prospect of never seeing each other again". Emmanuel went on to praise the relationship that has developed between these two characters, stating that it's "something sweet and pure and beautiful".

Gemma Whelan said in an interview with Entertainment Weekly that the kissing scene by Yara Greyjoy and Ellaria Sand before the battle sequence at the end was improvised. She stated that "It wasn’t directed that we would kiss, - It just seemed like something we should do". The scenes with the Sand Snakes was originally planned to be a more "drawn out storyline", but due to Jessica Henwick's schedule filming her scenes as Colleen Wing in Iron Fist and The Defenders, she would have had to go back and forth to shoot both shows. Speaking about the battle sequence, Henwick said "normally there’s a lot of CG and you watch it on screen and you see a massive epic battle, but when you’re filming it’s all quite tame by comparison. For this, the audience can’t feel the heat on their face from the pyrotechnics going off or feel the wave machine trying to knock us off our feet, or the sweat dripping off our faces."

Mylod also discussed his direction for the battle sequence, saying that "We agreed that the violence should be brutal and feel un-choreographed, that it shouldn't feel structured". Stunt coordinator Rowley Irlam also stated that they were inspired by riots when it was being choreographed. Mylod decided to put much more of the focus to Theon, Yara and Euron Greyjoy, rather than people around them.

== Reception ==
=== Ratings ===
"Stormborn" was viewed by 9.27 million total viewers on its initial viewing on HBO. The episode also acquired a 4.33 rating in the 18–49 demographic, making it the highest rated show on cable television of the night. In the United Kingdom, the episode was viewed by 2.770 million viewers on Sky Atlantic during its Simulcast, making it the highest-rated broadcast that week.

=== Critical reception ===
"Stormborn" has received high praise from critics. It has a 96% rating on the review aggregator website Rotten Tomatoes from 38 reviews with an average score of 8.2 out of 10. The site's consensus reads "While necessarily setting up the events for the season, "Stormborn" features compelling strategic discussion, and a cracking action sequence to end the episode with a bang."

Ed Power of The Daily Telegraph said "It's been a cautious start to 'Game of Thrones' season seven. But, following further, patience-testing re-arranging of the chess pieces, episode two went out in a literal blaze of glory." Matt Fowler of IGN described the episode as "amazing", saying "With Daenerys now in Westeros, war is imminent and worlds were colliding in this week's big episode." He gave the episode a 9 out of 10. Ben Philippe of New York Observer also gave a positive review, saying "'Stormborn,' proves that the table setting always pays off in Game of Thrones by giving us a sample platter of everything that the show does best."

Nina Shen Rastogi of New York Magazine similarly gave praise to the episode, writing "All of this prologue is what made the final scene land so hard, and so well. The shipboard battle between the Greyjoys was very good GOT, in my mind: dramatic, unexpected, and authentic on a character level." Sean T. Collins of Rolling Stone praised the battle sequence at the end, writing "It ends with a naval battle as grandiose as any we've seen in the series. But the strong second chapter of Game of Thrones' seventh season - 'Stormborn' - navigates even more treacherous waters."

=== Accolades ===
Year	Award	Category	Nominee(s)	Result	Ref.
2017	Hollywood Post Alliance	Outstanding Editing	Tim Porter	Nominated	
