= The Queen's Justice =

- Game of Thrones episode
- Episode no.: Season 7 Episode 3
- Directed by: Mark Mylod
- Written by: David Benioff; D. B. Weiss
- Cinematography by: P. J. Dillon
- Editing by: Jesse Parker
- Original air date: July 30, 2017
- Running time: 63 minutes

Guest appearances
- Diana Rigg as Olenna Tyrell; Jim Broadbent as Archmaester Ebrose; Pilou Asbæk as Euron Greyjoy; Gemma Whelan as Yara Greyjoy; Jacob Anderson as Grey Worm; Anton Lesser as Qyburn; Mark Gatiss as Tycho Nestoris; Rosabell Laurenti Sellers as Tyene Sand; Ellie Kendrick as Meera Reed; Hafþór Júlíus Björnsson as Gregor Clegane; Rupert Vansittart as Yohn Royce; James Faulkner as Randyll Tarly; Tom Hopper as Dickon Tarly; Brendan Cowell as Harrag; Richard Rycroft as Maester Wolkan; Staz Nair as Qhono

Episode chronology
| ← Previous "Stormborn" | Next → "The Spoils of War" |
- Game of Thrones season 7

"The Queen's Justice" is the third episode of the seventh season of HBO's medieval fantasy television series Game of Thrones, and the 63rd overall. The episode was written by series co-creators David Benioff and D. B. Weiss, and directed by Mark Mylod. It first aired on July 30, 2017.

In the episode, Jon Snow and Davos Seaworth meet with Daenerys Targaryen on Dragonstone, from whom Jon asks for aid in defeating the White Walkers. In King's Landing, Euron Greyjoy returns bearing gifts to Cersei Lannister, in the form of Ellaria Sand and Tyene Sand. At the Citadel, Samwell Tarly and Archmaester Ebrose examine a healed Jorah Mormont. In Winterfell, Sansa Stark is reunited with her brother Bran Stark. At Casterly Rock, the Unsullied infiltrate and capture the castle, but Euron's Iron Fleet arrives, and destroy their ships, leaving them stranded. Meanwhile, Jaime Lannister leads the Lannister army to take Highgarden.

The title of the episode refers to Cersei Lannister exacting vengeance, her own way of justice, on both the Sand Snakes and Olenna Tyrell. "The Queen's Justice" received positive reviews from critics, who considered the long-awaited meeting between Daenerys and Jon, the agonizing fates of Ellaria and Tyene Sand, Sansa and Bran's reunion, the bait-and-switch scene concerning Casterly Rock and Highgarden, and the final fate of Olenna Tyrell as highlights of the episode. In the United States, it achieved a viewership of 9.25 million in its initial broadcast. It was also Diana Rigg's pick to support her nomination at the 70th Primetime Creative Arts Emmy Awards for Outstanding Guest Actress.

"The Queen's Justice" marked the final appearances of Diana Rigg (Olena Tyrell), Rosabell Laurenti Sellers (Tyene Sand), and Indira Varma (Ellaria Sand).

== Plot ==
=== At Dragonstone ===
Jon and Davos arrive at Dragonstone with their soldiers, who are asked to surrender their weapons. Jon and Davos meet with Daenerys, who asks Jon to bend the knee. Jon refuses, insisting that they have bigger problems to deal with: the White Walkers. Daenerys doesn't believe him, saying she wants to take the Iron Throne before considering other threats. Before they reach a solution, they are interrupted by Varys, who tells Daenerys of Euron's attack on Yara's navy. Jon is forced to remain at Dragonstone.

Varys asks Melisandre why she hides from Jon; she admits they parted on bad terms due to her mistakes. She plans to return to Volantis, and Varys suggests that she not return to Westeros. Melisandre predicts that she will have to return one last time in the future.

Speaking with Jon, Tyrion explains that Daenerys' followers are loyal because Daenerys dedicates herself to protecting others from threats she understands. Jon is upset that nobody believes that the White Walkers are real, but Tyrion says that he believes him. Tyrion relays Jon's request to mine dragonglass on Dragonstone, which Daenerys accepts.

=== In the Narrow Sea ===
One of the few remaining ships of Yara's fleet rescue Theon. Theon claims that he tried to save Yara, but the Ironborn don't believe him.

=== In King's Landing ===
Euron parades his captives Ellaria, Tyene, and Yara through the streets of King's Landing. He presents the Sands as his gift to Cersei, and they are taken to the dungeons. Cersei kisses Tyene with the same poison Ellaria used to kill Myrcella, leaving Ellaria to watch her daughter die.

Tycho Nestoris of the Iron Bank comes to collect repayment of the Lannisters' loans. Cersei promises to pay the debt back in a fortnight.

=== At Winterfell ===
Sansa competently manages Winterfell, preparing it as an emergency refuge for all Northerners. Littlefinger counsels Sansa to "fight every battle" mentally so as to never be unprepared or surprised by her enemies. Bran and Meera arrive, and Sansa is reunited with her brother. In the Godswood, Sansa is confused by Bran's revelation that he is the Three-Eyed Raven, and troubled by his clairvoyant abilities.

=== In Oldtown ===
Archmaester Ebrose proclaims that Jorah is healed of greyscale and releases him. Sam admits that he administered the forbidden treatment; Ebrose praises his skill, but punishes his disobedience with an assignment to copy a large number of old documents.

=== At Casterly Rock ===
In a plan orchestrated by Tyrion, Grey Worm and the Unsullied infiltrate Casterly Rock through its sewers, which Tyrion designed. They conquer the castle, finding far fewer defenders than expected. Meanwhile, the Iron Fleet arrives and destroys Daenerys' ships, stranding the Unsullied.

=== At Highgarden ===
Jaime, Randyll, and their armies swiftly take Highgarden, having abandoned Casterly Rock to trick Daenerys into committing the Unsullied to a strategically useless position. Jaime grants Olenna the mercy of a quick and painless death by poison, over Cersei's original plans to execute her publicly and painfully. After drinking the poison, Olenna reveals to Jaime that she was the one who murdered Joffrey and asks him to tell Cersei. Shocked, Jaime leaves Olenna to die alone.

== Production ==
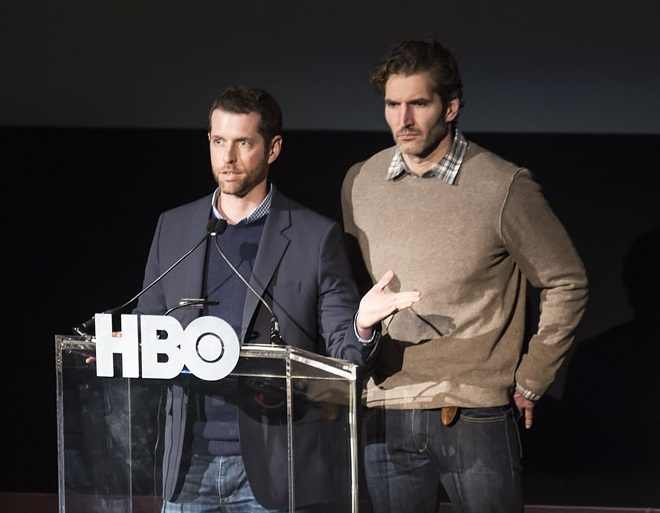
The episode was written by series co-creators David Benioff and D. B. Weiss.

"The Queen's Justice" was written by the series' co-creators, David Benioff and D. B. Weiss, and directed by Mark Mylod, his second of two episodes for this season. Mylod joined the series as a director in the fifth season, working on "High Sparrow" and "Sons of the Harpy". The title of the episode refers to the revenge against Cersei's enemies, specifically Ellaria Sand and Olenna Tyrell, who, besides opposing her in war, murdered her children Myrcella and Joffrey, respectively.

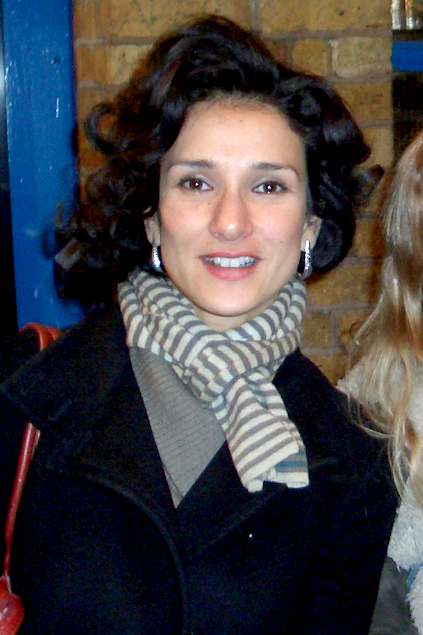
Indira Varma made her final appearance as Ellaria Sand.

"The Queen's Justice" was the final episode for actress Indira Varma, who had played Ellaria Sand since the fourth season. "The Queen's Justice" was also the last episode for recurring cast members Diana Rigg and Rosabell Laurenti Sellers, as Olenna Tyrell and Tyene Sand were killed. The episode featured the return of Mark Gatiss as Tycho Nestoris, who was last seen in season 5's "The Dance of Dragons".

Indira Varma and Rosabell Laurenti Sellers's last scene was technically difficult for the actresses, because they were shackled. The shackles were felt-lined but tight, and Varma and Sellers ended up "bruised and battered" due to the physical intensity of their acting. Varma had to be cut from the shackles at the end of the day.

Kit Harington spoke about the scene he shot with Peter Dinklage in Spain, saying "It was a beautiful location with 50 mph winds and I was wearing a cape next to a cliff—There was a danger of me being blown off! I'm not sure it's the way I would have wanted to go."

== Analysis ==
D. B. Weiss talked about the return of Bran to Winterfell, saying "One of the things we loved about Game of Thrones from the very first book is it's not a world where magic is the primary driver of the story, it's a world where human psychology and behavior and desire are drivers of the story. We try very hard to make sure it stays that way because that's a lot more relatable to the vast majority of the audience than magic powers—as much fun as those are. So with Bran, ideally you want to use him in a way that adds to the story and enriches the story and not in a way that's a magic bullet to conveniently deal with things that you haven't come up with a better way to deal with. So it was a balancing act to account for who Bran is now without letting that overtake the story."

Isaac Hempstead Wright explained how the magical conversion has altered the characters personality, saying "It's like imagining you have all of space and time in your head—Bran is existing in thousands of planes of existence at any one time. So it's quite difficult for Bran to have any kind of semblance of personality anymore because he's really like a giant computer". He went on to add that "Bran really at this stage is not the Three-Eyed Raven. He's got the title but hasn't had thousands of years of sitting in a cave looking through time. Somebody put in front of him a massive encyclopedia of all of time and he's only opened page one. He can look stuff up but doesn't have this all-knowing all-seeing capability just yet."

Indira Varma expected the seventh season would be her character's last, reasoning that a "less important character" like Ellaria would have to be phased out to make room for the story's climax. She expected audiences to be "more invested in Cersei," who had more screen time than Ellaria, but she hoped positive fan reception for Pedro Pascal as Oberyn Martell would carry over to sympathy for Ellaria. Varma had hoped for her character to die on screen, but found the fate Weiss and Benioff crafted for Ellaria to be "really clever" and beyond "every parent's worst nightmare."

Weiss praised Diana Rigg's performance in her final scene as Olenna Tyrell, for contributing to the character uniquely "winning her own death scene."

== Reception ==
=== Ratings ===
"The Queen's Justice" was viewed by 9.25 million total viewers on its initial viewing on HBO, which was slightly less than the previous week's rating of 9.27 million viewers for the episode "Stormborn". The episode also acquired a 4.3 rating in the 18–49 demographic, making it the highest rated show on cable television of the night. In the United Kingdom, the episode was viewed by 3.272 million viewers on Sky Atlantic during its Simulcast, making it the highest-rated broadcast that week.

=== Critical reception ===
"The Queen's Justice" received positive reactions from critics. Review aggregator site Rotten Tomatoes surveyed 40 reviews of the episode and judged 89% of them to be positive, with an average rating of 7.9 out of 10. The website's consensus for the episode stated "'The Queen's Justice' saw the much-anticipated meeting between Jon Snow and Daenerys Targaryen -- but had much larger surprises in store before its shocking end."

Matt Fowler of IGN described the episode as "amazing", saying "'The Queen's Justice' did justice to the long-awaited coming together of Jon Snow and Daenerys Targaryen. With a devilishly good script and some pointed action (along with a few twists and turns), this episode contained a ton of long scenes, but no fat. - This was prime Thrones." He gave the episode a 9.5 out of 10. Shane Ryan of Paste Magazine wrote "It was, by far, the best episode of the season. I've always contended that the show does best when it pushes the drama and the narrative ahead by means of two-person scenes, and the examples in 'The Queen's Justice' were phenomenal". Glen Weldon of NPR also praised the episode and Diana Rigg's performance, writing "It's a hell of a way to go out, but a character like Olenna -- and an actress like Rigg, who always let you see the danger flashing behind those eyes – deserves nothing less."

Bennett Madison of Vanity Fair wrote, "Game of Thrones has spent so much time building up tension and drawing out plots that many of its ongoing story lines have literally been brewing for years ... With this episode, 'The Queen's Justice', we're finally starting to see some real payoff." Andy Hartup of GamesRadar similarly gave praise to the episode for granting victories to antagonists like Cersei and Euron, while criticizing the character dynamics in scenes taking place at Winterfell and Dragonstone. Sean T. Collins of Rolling Stone wrote of the episode, "As befits its title, this week's installment asks us to consider what it means to be a ruler ... and what it means to seek justice." Kevin Yeoman of Screen Rant praised the final scene of Olenna Tyrell, writing "As much as a momentous encounter between two major characters grabbed the spotlight, Game of Thrones proved that a character's last words could be just as important as their first." Alyssa Rosenberg of The Washington Post praised the performances of Rigg, Coster-Waldau and Dinklage, but was critical of Emilia Clarke and Kit Harington's scenes together, writing that "in the Dragonstone scenes, Clarke and Harington mostly served to bring out each other's most wooden line readings". She also addressed the way the episode approached themes of female empowerment, writing that "if any show has been a cautionary tale about the difference between female empowerment and true social change, Game of Thrones has been it".

=== Accolades ===
| Year | Award | Category | Nominee(s) | Result | Ref. |
|---|---|---|---|---|---|
| 2017 | Hollywood Post Alliance | Outstanding Editing | Jesse Parker | Nominated | |
| 2018 | Art Directors Guild Awards | One-Hour Single Camera Period or Fantasy Television Series | Deborah Riley | Won | |
| 2018 | Primetime Emmy Awards | Outstanding Guest Actress in a Drama Series | Diana Rigg as Olenna Tyrell | Nominated | |
