= What Is Dead May Never Die =

- Game of Thrones episode
- Episode no.: Season 2 Episode 3
- Directed by: Alik Sakharov
- Written by: Bryan Cogman
- Cinematography by: P.J. Dillon
- Editing by: Katie Weiland
- Original air date: April 15, 2012
- Running time: 52 minutes

Guest appearances
- Donald Sumpter as Maester Luwin; Ron Donachie as Rodrik Cassel; Julian Glover as Grand Maester Pycelle; Robert Pugh as Craster; Patrick Malahide as Balon Greyjoy; Francis Magee as Yoren; Gethin Anthony as Renly Baratheon; Joe Dempsie as Gendry; Tom Wlaschiha as Jaqen H'ghar; Gwendoline Christie as Brienne of Tarth; Finn Jones as Loras Tyrell; Ben Hawkey as Hot Pie; Eros Vlahos as Lommy Greenhands; Gemma Whelan as Yara Greyjoy; Kristian Nairn as Hodor; Hannah Murray as Gilly; Fintan McKeown as Amory Lorch; Andy Kellegher as Polliver; Andy Beckwith as Rorge; Gerard Jordan as Biter; Jonathan Ryan as a Drowned Priest; Aimee Richardson as Myrcella Baratheon; Callum Wharry as Tommen Baratheon

Episode chronology
← Previous "The Night Lands"	Next → "Garden of Bones"
- Game of Thrones season 2

"What Is Dead May Never Die" is the third episode of the second season of HBO's medieval fantasy television series Game of Thrones, first airing on April 15, 2012. The episode is written by Bryan Cogman and directed by Alik Sakharov, who worked previously as the director of photography on four season one episodes.

The plot continues events built up in previous episodes: the aftermath of Jon Snow's investigation into Craster, Catelyn Stark's journey to the Stormlands in order to ask for Renly Baratheon's assistance in fighting the Lannisters, Theon Greyjoy's internal conflict as to where his allegiance lies, Tyrion Lannister uses his cunning to find his sister's spy within the Small Council, and Arya is consoled by Yoren before being confronted by soldiers looking for Gendry. The episode's title is taken from a prayer used on the Iron Islands, by worshippers of the Drowned God.

The episode was acclaimed by critics, with many praising the growing development of many story arcs and its emotional depth.

== Plot ==
=== Beyond The Wall ===
Craster returns with Jon and orders the Night's Watch off his lands. Mormont admits to Jon that he already knew of Craster's sacrifice of his sons, but argues that Craster is indispensable for the Night's Watch's campaign. Sam promises to come back for Gilly when the Night's Watch returns to the Wall.

=== At Winterfell ===
Bran dreams again that he is his direwolf, Summer. Luwin assures him the time of magic and dragons is over.

=== In King's Landing ===
Dining with her children and Sansa, Cersei discusses the war and Sansa's betrothal to Joffrey. Afterward, Sansa is greeted by Shae, posing as her new handmaiden.

Tyrion separately shares plans with Pycelle, Varys, and Littlefinger, to marry Myrcella off, but suggests a different husband to each of them. Cersei confronts Tyrion over the plan Tyrion gave to Pycelle, confirming Pycelle is her spy. Tyrion sends him to the dungeons, but not before Pycelle confesses that he told Cersei that Arryn knew of her incest with Jaime. Tyrion convinces Littlefinger to meet Catelyn in the Stormlands and persuade her to release Jaime.

=== On the Iron Islands ===
Balon plans war on the North with Yara, who tells Theon he must choose between the Starks or the Greyjoys. Theon considers warning Robb, but decides to serve under his father.

=== In The Stormlands ===
Catelyn arrives at self-crowned Renly's camp, where he and his new wife Margaery Tyrell watch imposing female warrior Brienne of Tarth win a tournament against Margaery's brother Loras. Renly grants Brienne a place in his Kingsguard, and is confident his army can defeat the Lannisters, but Catelyn reminds him his men are inexperienced. When Renly is unable to consummate their marriage, Margaery reveals she knows of his relationship with Loras, but insists her pregnancy must secure their families’ alliance.

=== On the Kingsroad ===
Yoren tells Arya how he joined the Night's Watch. Lannister men led by Ser Amory Lorch arrive and demand Gendry, and the ensuing battle leaves the Night's Watch men dead. Arya rescues the prisoners, including Jaqen H'ghar, and loses her sword Needle to a Lannister soldier, Polliver. Lorch orders the survivors taken to Harrenhal, and Polliver kills wounded Lommy Greenhands. Lorch demands the survivors point out Gendry, but before he can give himself up, Arya tells Lorch that Lommy was Gendry.

== Production ==
=== Writing ===
"What Is Dead May Never Die" was written by the story editor Bryan Cogman, based on George R. R. Martin's original book A Clash of Kings. Cogman, who is responsible for keeping the show's bible and had already written the first season's fourth episode, was on set for the filming of all the scenes of his episode.

The chapters of the book included in the episode are Arya IV, Tyrion IV, Arya V, Catelyn II, Tyrion VI, Bran IV, (chapters 15, 18, 20, 23, 26 and 29) and also the parts of Tyrion I, Tyrion II, Tyrion V, Jon III and Theon II that had not been included in the previous episode (4, 9, 21, 24 and 25).

"The 'burning the letter' scene was interesting—it wasn't in our outline. (...) But there was something missing—and ultimately, it had to come back to Robb. In our version of the story, Theon is very close to him—he's the brother he never had. And I wanted to take him right up to the point of betraying his own blood—so that's where the warning to Robb scene came from. And at first, it was more elaborate—he was going to write it, take it to a rookery, nearly give it to a maester—(...). It was going to be more of scene/scene. But it never worked, so we just went with the simple act...

Now it helped that Alfie is so bloody fantastic in the scene and that Alik Sakharov directed it as if he was directed a huge setpiece—meaning he gave it the same time and attention as a 'big' scene. He did take after take after take with Alfie trying it all kinds of different ways—perfection."

— Bryan Cogman, interviewed by Westeros.org

The scenes set in the Iron Islands were created specifically for the show, as the books jump directly from Balon's revelation that he intends to attack the North to Theon overseeing the preparations of the attack. To flesh out the transition and flesh out Theon's feelings on his change of loyalties, Bryan Cogman included a scene of Theon writing a letter to Robb only to burn it afterwards, and the ritual baptism on the shores of Pyke. Cogman noted that, while those scenes have nearly no dialogue, they are the ones he's most proud of in his episode.

Another scene created for the show was the dinner between Cersei and the children. The scene was included to remind the audience who Myrcella was, since her potential marriages were discussed in the episode. Aimee Richardson, the actor playing Myrcella (who has appeared in many past episodes as a background character), sent a note to Cogman thanking him for her "lines" in this scene.

The final scene also had to be redesigned in relation to the books, due to the constraints imposed by the location, the schedule, and the time restrictions for the child actors. Cogman's first draft was more similar to the books, with Arya, Gendry, Lommy, and Hot Pie first fleeing and then being captured, but finally it was decided to combine both scenes. Cogman was also dismayed that he had to cut one of his favourite scenes in the books: Arya and Hot Pie charging while shouting the battle cries "Winterfell" and "Hot Pie."

In the audio commentary for this episode, included on the DVD and Blu-ray editions of Season 2, Cogman revealed that his initial script was over three hours long and had to be cut significantly (for example, Cogman mentioned that before the cuts he had included a long, drawn out fight scene between Jon and Craster, which was changed at the suggestion of director Alik Sakharov to a shot of Craster dragging Jon back to his keep). Cogman revealed that the sequences between Tyrion and Pycelle, Varys, Littlefinger, and Cersei were among his favorites.

=== Casting ===
This episode marks the first appearance of two new characters: Lady Margaery Tyrell, the new queen of King Renly Baratheon and sister of his lover, Loras Tyrell; and Brienne of Tarth, a member of Renly's guard.

Natalie Dormer was cast as Margaery; her character was aged in relation to the book's counterpart (Dormer was 29 during the filming of season 2, while the Margaery from the books was 15), and her role was significantly expanded from a background, though important, character in the novels to a main character in the show. Dormer was also added to the series' main cast. Margaery is the youngest member of the Tyrell family in the novels, but as Dormer is six years older than Finn Jones, who plays Loras, Margaery is older than Loras in the show.

For the role of Brienne the producers chose the English actress Gwendoline Christie. According to the character's creator George R. R. Martin, when he saw the first batch of auditions he saw "a dozen actresses who were reading for Brienne and one actress who was Brienne," and it was one of the cases when there wasn't any debate. Due to her outstanding height (6 ft 3 in, 1.91 m) she was earmarked early on by fans of the books as a good fit for the character, and one of them even emailed her agent. Christie already knew about the role and felt that she could relate to the character after having been bullied for her height and androgynous looks. After deciding to "go all out for it," she read the books, started building up with cardio-vascular exercises and kickboxing practices, and even started to wear unisex clothing in order to increase her own masculinity. After she had been cast, she continued to train and received extensive sword fighting and horse-riding lessons. Her last step in the process of transformation was cutting off her long hair, which she found deeply upsetting because she felt it was her last bond to her old self. The day after her hair was cut off, she went to her hotel room and cried.

=== Filming locations ===
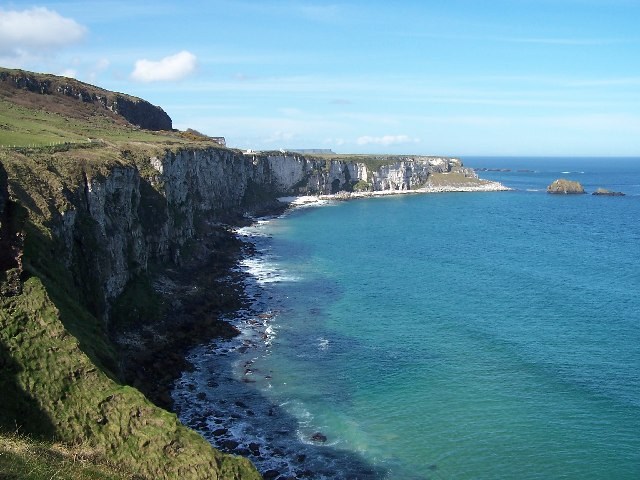
Renly's camp was built at the Larrybane Bay.

To reproduce Renly's camp, the production built a set at Larrybane chalk quarry beside Carrick-a-Rede.

On September 12, 2011, while filming was taking place in Renly's camp, the high winds caused by Hurricane Katia destroyed a steel-framed marquee and five extras received minor injuries. Furthermore, the extreme weather conditions made some of the footage unusable, and they had to rebuild the set in October to reshoot some scenes. Among the scenes that had to be repeated there was the duel between Brienne and Loras and Catelyn's arrival.

In the audio commentary for the episode, Bryan Cogman revealed that only 200 extras were used in scenes in Renly's camp, though there appeared to be many more.

== Reception ==
=== Ratings ===
The viewership of the episode consolidated the ratings obtained in the second season, matching the previous week's 3.8 million viewers in the first run of the night and reaching a total of 4.5 million with the two airings. In the United Kingdom, the episode was seen by 0.815 million viewers on Sky Atlantic, being the channel's highest-rated broadcast that week.

=== Critical reception ===
The episode received critical acclaim; review aggregator Rotten Tomatoes surveyed 14 reviews of the episode and judged 100% of them to be positive with an average score of 8.5 out of 10. The website's critical consensus reads, "Superbly written and directed, 'What is Dead May Never Die' evokes a range of emotions as uneasy alliances are forged, past traumas are explored, and the stakes grow ever higher." Matt Fowler of IGN rated the episode 8.5 out of 10. The A.V. Club gave it an A−.
