= Arianne Martell =

- A Song of Ice and Fire character
- First appearance: A Feast for Crows (2005)
- Created by: George R. R. Martin

In-universe information
- Gender: Female
- Title: Princess
- Family: House Martell
- Relatives: Doran Martell (father); Mellario of Norvos (mother); Quentyn Martell (brother); Trystane Martell (brother); Princess of Dorne (grandmother); Elia Martell (aunt); Oberyn Martell (uncle); Rhaenys Targaryen (cousin); Aegon Targaryen (cousin); Obara Sand (cousin); Nymeria Sand (cousin); Tyene Sand (cousin); Sarella Sand (cousin); Elia Sand (cousin); Obella Sand (cousin); Dorea Sand (cousin); Loreza Sand (cousin); Lewyn Martell (granduncle)

Arianne Nymeros Martell is a fictional character in the A Song of Ice and Fire series of epic fantasy novels by American author George R. R. Martin. She is a member of House Martell and the heir to the desert kingdom of Dorne. Arianne is first mentioned in A Game of Thrones (1996) and first appears in A Feast for Crows (2005). The character also appears in A Dance with Dragons (2011) and will appear in the forthcoming volume The Winds of Winter.

Arianne has been positively received as a strong and complex female character. As a result of her storyline in A Feast for Crows, which deals with Arianne's struggle to subvert the patriarchal system of Westeros, she has sometimes been described as a "feminist icon".

Arianne was controversially cut from the television adaptation Game of Thrones in favor of Ellaria Sand becoming a composite character of herself and Arianne.

== Storylines ==
=== Books ===
==== A Feast for Crows and A Dance with Dragons ====
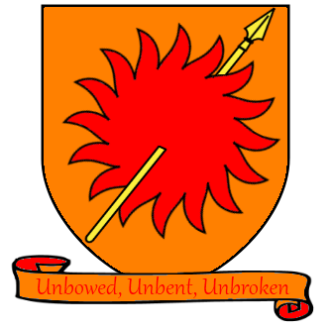
Coat of arms of House Martell

Arianne is the only daughter and eldest child of Prince Doran Martell and Lady Mellario of Norvos. She has two younger brothers, Quentyn Martell and Trystane.

Arianne is dissatisfied with her father Doran, believing him to be weak due to his inaction over the deaths of his sister, Elia, and brother, Oberyn, at the hands of House Lannister. She fears being replaced as his heir by her younger brother Quentyn because she was never trained to rule and because a letter suggests Doran intends to name Quentyn heir. Doran has also imprisoned her cousins, the Sand Snakes, seemingly to placate the Iron Throne. To safeguard her birthright to Dorne, free her cousins and avenge her dead family members, Arianne plots to crown Myrcella Baratheon as queen of the Seven Kingdoms in opposition to the incumbent ruler (and Myrcella's younger brother), Tommen Baratheon. Arianne seduces Arys Oakheart to win his support away from Myrcella. The plot is foiled, and Myrcella is wounded in the kidnapping attempt. As Arianne confronts Doran after he foils her plans, her father reveals that he has been plotting revenge on Tywin Lannister for many years and was waiting for the perfect time to strike. Now aware of her father's plans and assured she is not being replaced as heir, Arianne reconciles with him.

==== The Winds of Winter ====
After the Golden Company invades Westeros, Doran sends Arianne to find out the truth about the claimant Aegon VI Targaryen.

=== Reception and analysis ===
Arianne Martell is the first-introduced person of color to serve as a point-of-view character in A Song of Ice and Fire, and, along with Asha Greyjoy and Melisandre, she considered to be among the minor (Note: Arianne has two point of view chapters in A Feast for Crows. She is a minor point of view character in relation to women with far more chapters, such as Catelyn, Sansa and Arya Stark, Cersei Lannister, and Daenerys Targaryen.) female point-of-view characters in the books. She is a popular character among readers, being regarded as one of the most compelling female characters in the series. Arianne's struggle to subvert the patriarchal system of Westeros, her struggle against her father, and her plot to crown Myrcella as queen has led some readers to consider the character a "feminist icon", as well as "one of Martin's most feminist characters". While not the only woman in the series who feels ignored and overlooked because of her gender, Arianne is the only woman in A Song of Ice and Fire whose independence and authority are also supported by the culture surrounding her since she by Dornish custom is Doran's rightful heir. Since Arianne's storyline explores how laws can be unfair, inconsistent and sexist, her storyline is one of several in the book series that question whether there is such a thing as a rightful ruler.

Arianne is portrayed as empowered, cunning, and highly intelligent. She also stands up to men around her who try to act as her superior. Although Arianne is scheming, impulsive, and flawed, she has a conscience and is also warm and likable. Ariana Quiñónes, writing for Hypable in 2015, considered Arianne to in many ways be "the most modern point of view character" in the books due to her "up and down" arc in A Feast for Crows, wherein she makes mistakes but also learns from them. Quiñónes interpreted Arianne's storyline in A Feast for Crows as a coming-of-age story focusing on female and familial relationships.

Arianne is first presented in the chapter of fellow point-of-view character Arys Oakheart as a highly sexual person seemingly motivated by little else than sexual desire in Arys. Both Arys and another point-of-view character, Areo Hotah, make remarks on Arianne's body. Arianne's only on-page sexual encounter is with Arys. In Arianne's own chapters, her behavior towards Arys is revealed to be a role she plays, using her brains and sexuality as weapons; she has sex with Arys in order to convince him of her plot to crown Myrcella. Her main concerns are not sexual but instead to make her plans work and to keep all of her friends and allies safe. Though she did seduce Arys as part of her plans, she also feels remorse for him after he is killed due to her schemes. Arianne's highly sexualized portrayal in the chapters of Arys Oakheart (and to an extent Areo Hotah) strides close to racial tropes of darker-skinned characters being more sexual. Since Arianne is revealed to be more complex in her own chapters, this appears intended to reflect real-world stereotypes also present in the fictional world (which Arianne exploits to her advantage).

=== Omission from Game of Thrones ===
The storyline and political situation in Dorne in the HBO television adaptation differ considerably from those in the books. Among the most prominent alterations is that Arianne was entirely cut from the television series despite being considered an essential character by George R. R. Martin. Instead, Doran's youngest son in the books (Trystane Martell) was changed to be the heir to Dorne. Some aspects of Arianne's character and storyline were transferred to Ellaria Sand, though Ellaria's altered characterization considerably changed her character from that in the books, such as murdering Myrcella, Doran and Trystane and then usurping power in Dorne with no objection.

The production team never disclosed the reason for omitting Arianne, but commenters speculated it mainly had to do with trimming the storyline due to time constraints. In the books, the storyline expands significantly in A Feast for Crows, introducing several new characters. The showrunners of Game of Thrones, however, felt the series needed to stay focused on its established cast to maintain the storyline's momentum. Even before the fifth season of Game of Thrones (when the Dornish plot takes place), the many storylines and characters were difficult to balance from practical and financial standpoints. In addition to the altered Dornish storyline, the appearance of Aegon "Young Griff" Targaryen and his invasion of the Seven Kingdoms in A Dance With Dragons, another storyline in which Arianne will take part in The Winds of Winter, was completely omitted from Game of Thrones. The television series had another opportunity to introduce Arianne in its final episode ("The Iron Throne"), wherein a new previously unseen Dornish ruler is featured, but instead made the new ruler of Dorne a man.

As an important character in the Dornish storyline, Arianne's omission from the television adaptation was met with disappointment and some outrage by readers of the book series and has been widely regarded as detrimental to the plot. Her exclusion was also met with some surprise since she is one of the handful of strong and complex major female characters in the books. Themes explored through Arianne in the books, such as female versus male inheritance rights, are on account her absence left largely unexplored in Game of Thrones. Some commenters argued that the omission of Arianne was sexist since it resulted in the omission of a complex female character and her female-driven agenda and replaced a storyline centered on Arianne, and involving multiple women, with a storyline focused on a man, Jaime Lannister, wherein female characters such as Ellaria and the Sand Snakes only served to hinder his redemption and do more harm than good, since their overall goal was to murder an innocent child rather than strategic warfare.

== Family tree of House Martell ==
Family tree of House Martell

Princess of Dorne	Lewyn
Doran	Mellario of Norvos	Mors	Olyvar	Elia	Rhaegar; Targaryen	Ellaria; Sand	Oberyn "The Red Viper"
Arianne	Quentyn	Trystane	Rhaenys; Targaryen	Aegon; Targaryen	Obara; Sand	Nymeria; Sand	Tyene; Sand
Elia; Sand	Obella; Sand	Dorea; Sand	Loreza; Sand	Sarella; Sand
