= The Winds of Winter =

Novel by George R. R. Martin

- Author: George R. R. Martin
- Language: English
- Series: A Song of Ice and Fire
- Release number: 6
- Genre: Epic fantasy
- Publisher: Bantam Spectra (US); Voyager Books (UK)
- Publication date: TBD
- Publication place: United States
- Preceded by: A Dance with Dragons
- Followed by: A Dream of Spring (planned)

The Winds of Winter is the planned sixth and penultimate novel of the epic fantasy series A Song of Ice and Fire by American writer George R. R. Martin. The novel, which has been in the works since 2011, has been described as one of the most anticipated books in modern history.

Following the troubled creation of A Feast for Crows and A Dance with Dragons, which had been released in volumes due to length, Martin began The Winds of Winter with a large amount of content that had been cut from the previous entry. Martin had been optimistic that the book's writing would progress significantly faster than earlier books, initially hoping to complete the book before the television series eclipsed complete material. However, development of The Winds of Winter has been similarly troubled, causing the television series to run out of material after the fifth season and follow its own narrative which was met with an overall mixed critical reception, particularly the final season.

Since 2010, Martin has made numerous predictions regarding imminent publication of the novel, all of which passed without publication. Martin has continued to face controversy due to the delay in completion of The Winds of Winter. He has described the novel as "the curse of my life", and has previously said that he was "struggling" with the manuscript. As of January 2026, Martin has reported that he is still working on finishing The Winds of Winter with around 1,100 finished manuscript pages.

== Plot ==
Martin stated in a 2012 interview that The Winds of Winter and the following book A Dream of Spring would take readers farther north than any of the previous books, and the Others will appear in the book. The previous installment, A Dance with Dragons, covered less story than Martin intended, excluding at least one planned large battle sequence and leaving several character threads ending in cliffhangers. Martin intends to resolve these storylines "very early" in The Winds of Winter, saying "I'm going to open with the two big battles that I was building up to, the battle in the ice and the battle at Meereen—the battle of Slaver's Bay. And then take it from there."

A Victarion Greyjoy chapter will begin five minutes after the end of A Dance with Dragons, taking place on the eve of the Ironborn's arrival in Slaver's Bay. Arianne Martell sample chapters that Martin released on his website showed her heading for Griffin's Roost to meet Young Griff, who is calling himself Aegon Targaryen. At Guadalajara International Book Fair 2016, Martin gave some clues about the dark nature of The Winds of Winter: "I've been telling you for 20 years that winter was coming. Winter is the time when things die, and cold and ice and darkness fill the world, so this is not going to be the happy feel-good that people may be hoping for. Some of the characters [are] in very dark places. .... Things get worse before they get better, so things are getting worse for a lot of people."

== Potential viewpoint characters ==
Martin has confirmed that the following characters have perspective chapters in The Winds of Winter:

- Sansa Stark: One chapter was removed from A Dance with Dragons in June 2010, and one sample chapter titled Alayne appeared on Martin's website in April 2015.
- Arya Stark: One chapter was removed from A Dance with Dragons in June 2010, and one sample chapter titled Mercy appeared on Martin's website in March 2014.
- Arianne Martell: Two chapters were removed from A Dance with Dragons in June 2010. One sample chapter appeared on Martin's website in January 2013, and was read at Harbour Front Literaturfestival in June 2015. Martin read from both chapters at MystiCon in February 2016. In May 2016, Martin replaced the sample Sansa Stark chapter titled Alayne on his website from 2015 with the first Arianne Martell chapter he has read from at MystiCon.
- Aeron Greyjoy: One chapter was removed from A Dance with Dragons in July 2010. A chapter titled The Forsaken was read in May 2016 at Balticon. It was written in, or before, 2011 but there was no confirmation that this was the chapter removed from A Dance with Dragons.
- Theon Greyjoy: One sample chapter appeared on Martin's website in December 2011. It also appears as a teaser chapter at the end of the UK paperback edition of A Dance with Dragons (part two).
- Victarion Greyjoy: Portions of one chapter were first read at TIFF Bell Lightbox in March 2012.
- Tyrion Lannister: One chapter was read at Eastercon in April 2012, and another one at Worldcon in August 2013, the second of which was later published in the official iOS app on March 20, 2014.
- Barristan Selmy: One chapter was released as a teaser at the end of the 2013 U.S. paperback edition of A Dance with Dragons. In 2013, Martin read from a second chapter at Boskone.
- Cersei Lannister
- Jaime Lannister
- Brienne of Tarth
- Areo Hotah
- Jon Connington
- Bran Stark

Martin confirmed that some of these previously released chapters have been rewritten.

Martin confirmed that there are no new viewpoint characters intended for The Winds of Winter. He also stated that Samwell Tarly and Asha Greyjoy will appear in the novel, but did not elaborate if as viewpoint characters. He has also stated that non-viewpoint characters Lady Stoneheart, Quaithe, Euron Greyjoy and Rickon Stark will appear. He stated that Melisandre will return as viewpoint but did not state which novel her chapters will appear in. He teased at the 2014 San Diego Comic-Con that Jeyne Westerling, Robb Stark's widow, will appear in the prologue chapter, but did not reveal who will be the POV character.

== Publication history ==
=== Structure and length ===
The Winds of Winter was originally intended, in the very early stages of the series, to be the final installment of A Song of Ice and Fire (then conceived as a trilogy). Following his expansion of the series, Martin eventually concluded it would be succeeded by one final novel, A Dream of Spring.

Martin believes the last two volumes of the series will be works of more than 1,500 manuscript pages each. He does not intend to separate characters by geography again, as he was forced to do with A Feast for Crows because of the unpublishable length of that novel's original manuscript. But, as he stated in a 2011 interview, "Three years from now when I'm sitting on 1,800 pages of manuscript with no end in sight, who the hell knows". In 2018, he revealed that some of his publishers had suggested splitting The Winds of Winter into two books but that he was "resisting that notion". In 2022, he stated that The Winds of Winter could be bigger than A Storm of Swords or A Dance with Dragons; the manuscript for A Storm of Swords had 1,521 pages and the manuscript for A Dance with Dragons exceeded 1,600 pages before trimming.

=== Confirmed chapters ===
By June 2010, Martin had finished four chapters for The Winds of Winter from the viewpoints of Sansa Stark, Arya Stark, and Arianne Martell. In July 2010, he added an Aeron Greyjoy chapter that had been moved from A Dance with Dragons to The Winds of Winter, accumulating around 100 completed manuscript pages. Following the publication of A Dance with Dragons in July 2011, Martin returned to writing the series in January 2012, having spent the intervening time on his U.S. and overseas book publicity tours and attending various conventions.

In December 2011, Martin posted a Theon Greyjoy viewpoint chapter from The Winds of Winter; he also included another sample chapter at the end of the North American paperback version of A Dance with Dragons, which was originally expected to be released in mid-2012, but was released on October 29, 2013. (International paperback editions of A Dance with Dragons published a year earlier did not include an unpublished sample chapter.) In the first quarter of 2012, Martin read new chapters of other characters at public events, including the chapters of Victarion Greyjoy and Tyrion Lannister. Martin continued work editing anthologies and completing a large, highly detailed series atlas The Lands of Ice and Fire, which was published in October 2012. Martin published another sample chapter from Arianne Martell's POV on his website in January 2013. On March 27, ten days before the Game of Thrones season four premiere, Martin posted a chapter on his website, titled Mercy. Martin said the new chapter is actually an old one, though never published nor publicly read. In April 2015, Martin posted a Sansa Stark viewpoint chapter from The Winds of Winter titled Alayne. In May 2016, Martin replaced this chapter with an Arianne Martell chapter he had read from at Mysticon.

As of June 2016, a total of 11 chapters from The Winds of Winter had been either read publicly or published as sample chapters. The point of view characters with released material are Victarion, Aeron, Tyrion, Barristan, Arianne, Theon, Mercy (Arya), and Alayne (Sansa). In 2018, Martin indicated he would not release any more sample chapters. In 2020, he indicated he had been revising some of the sample chapters.
