= Ellaria Sand =

- A Song of Ice and Fire character Game of Thrones character
- Indira Varma as Ellaria Sand
- First appearance: Novel: A Storm of Swords (2000); Television: "Two Swords" (2014)
- Last appearance: Television: "The Queen's Justice" (2017)
- Created by: George R. R. Martin
- Portrayed by: Indira Varma

In-universe information
- Alias: The Serpent's Whore
- Gender: Female
- Family: House Uller
- Significant other: Oberyn Martell
- Children: Elia Sand; Obella Sand; Dorea Sand; Loreza Sand; Television: Tyene Sand
- Relatives: Harmen Uller (father); Ulwyck Uller (uncle)

Ellaria Sand is a fictional character in the A Song of Ice and Fire series of high fantasy novels by American author George R. R. Martin and its television adaptation Game of Thrones, where she is portrayed by Indira Varma.

Ellaria first appears in the third novel A Storm of Swords (2000). She is only mentioned in A Feast for Crows (2005), but returns in A Dance with Dragons (2011). She is the paramour to Oberyn Martell and mother to several of his bastard daughters, the Sand Snakes. After the death of her lover in a duel at the hands of Ser Gregor Clegane, she is sent into deep mourning, though she pushes for Oberyn's brother Doran Martell to sue for peace, seeking an end to the cycle of revenge.

In the television adaptation, Ellaria becomes a composite character of her book counterpart and Oberyn's niece, Arianne Martell as she is seeking for Dorne to go to war against the Lannisters for their crimes against House Martell. However, in stark contrast to Arianne, Ellaria is portrayed as a ruthless gold digger and a vengeful killer who seeks to murder the innocent Myrcella Baratheon, instead of crowning her to oppose Cersei and Tommen, and then slays Oberyn's remaining family so that she can seize power in Dorne, which ultimately leads to her own death and the deaths of the oldest three Sand Snakes at the hands of Cersei and Euron Greyjoy.

Though Varma's performance was praised, Ellaria's story arc as well as the overall Dorne story in the series was met with a mixed critical reception, with feminist groups praising Ellaria's role as a symbol of opposing the patriarchy, while critics and fans of the novels panned her characterization for its lack of fidelity to the source material, as well as the omissions of Arianne Martell, Quentyn Martell and Young Griff, and the killing off of Doran Martell.

== Character description ==
Ellaria Sand is a bastard of Harmen Uller, head of House Uller and Lord of Hellholt in Dorne. Dorne's views and customs towards children born out of wedlock differ from those of the rest of Westeros, where bastards are often discriminated against. She is the paramour of Oberyn Martell, as even in Dorne, a Prince cannot marry a bastard. She is the mother of the youngest four Sand Snakes (Oberyn's bastard daughters). Like Oberyn, she is bisexual.

In the novels, Ellaria Sand is mostly a background character. She is not a point-of-view character; instead, readers see her actions through the eyes of others, such as Tyrion Lannister, Arianne Martell, and Areo Hotah.

== Storylines ==
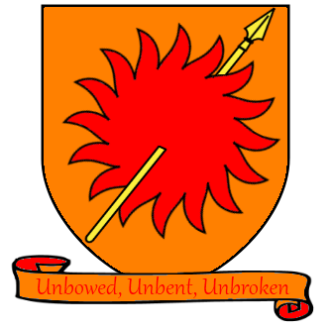
Coat of arms of House Martell

=== A Storm of Swords ===
Ellaria comes with Oberyn to King's Landing, as part of Tyrion Lannister's efforts to win them to the Iron Throne. Oberyn, however, clearly wants revenge for his sister's death, apparently committed on the orders of Tywin Lannister, during King Robert's rebellion. Oberyn wants Ellaria to sit with him at Joffrey Baratheon's wedding, causing trouble when Olenna Tyrell calls her "the serpent's whore". Later, when Tyrion is condemned for poisoning Joffrey Baratheon, Oberyn acts as his champion in a trial by combat against Ser Gregor Clegane, who had raped and murdered Oberyn's sister, Elia Martell, during the Sack of King's Landing. Oberyn wounds Gregor with a poisoned spear but is killed by Gregor. Afterwards, Ellaria returns to Dorne.

=== A Dance with Dragons ===
Gregor Clegane apparently dies of the poison after spending days in agony (Oberyn having treated the poison to work slowly). His skull is sent to Dorne, where Oberyn's brother, Doran Martell, the ruling Prince of Dorne, sees it. Despite Gregor and Tywin's deaths, Oberyn's bastard daughters want revenge. Ellaria argues against revenge, saying all those they want revenge against are dead and the Lannisters they are now targeting took no part in their kin's deaths. She reminds them Oberyn died trying to avenge his sister's death and worries they too will die, if they seek vengeance. Doran sends her back to her father, Lord Harmen Uller of Hellholt with her youngest daughter Loreza Sand.

== TV adaptation ==
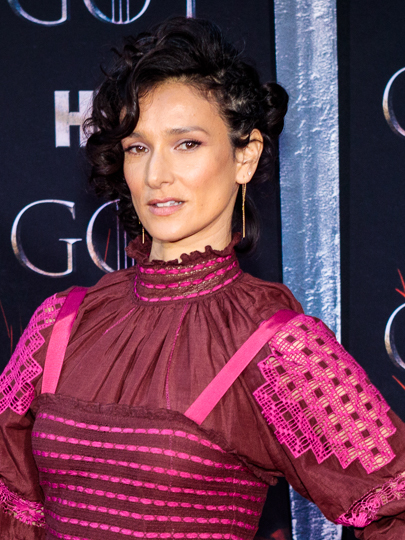
Indira Varma at the Game of Thrones season 8 World Premiere in 2019.

The British actress Indira Varma plays Ellaria Sand in the television adaptation of the book series. She won the Empire Hero Award along with the rest of the cast in 2015. She was also nominated, along with the rest of the cast, for a Screen Actors Guild Award for Outstanding Performance by an Ensemble in a Drama Series in 2016.

=== Season 4 ===
Ellaria Sand's storyline in this season is very similar to her storyline in A Storm of Swords.

=== Season 5 ===
Ellaria tries to persuade Doran Martell, Prince of Dorne, to avenge his brother's death. However, Doran refuses, as Oberyn's death was via trial by combat; therefore, by Westerosi law, Gregor Clegane did not murder Oberyn. Ellaria soon learns that Jaime Lannister is sailing for Dorne, planning to rescue his daughter, Myrcella Baratheon, who betrothed to Doran's son, Trystane Martell. When Jaime arrives at the Water Gardens, the Sand Snakes attack him and Bronn, but the skirmish ends with all arrested by Martell guards. Doran and Jaime reach a deal: Trystane will marry Myrcella, but the two will live in King's Landing, and Trystane will be granted a seat on the Small Council. Doran threatens Ellaria with death if she ever defies him, and she feigns allegiance to him. She kisses Myrcella goodbye at the docks, secretly wearing lipstick coated with a slow-acting poison, which kills Myrcella on the ship headed for King's Landing.

=== Season 6 ===
After Doran Martell realises that Myrcella has been murdered, Ellaria stabs Doran; in King's Landing, Obara and Nymeria, who had snuck onto the ship headed to King's Landing, kill Trystane. This makes Ellaria the de facto ruler of Dorne, with the Dornish guards allying with Ellaria after having grown disillusioned with Doran's lack of action against the Lannisters. A while later, Ellaria invites Olenna Tyrell to Dorne, shortly after Mace, Loras, and Margaery Tyrell have all been killed by Cersei Lannister, Queen of the Seven Kingdoms. Despite Olenna not trusting Ellaria fully due to her also having seized power via murder, Ellaria reveals that she has allied with Varys and is ready to offer her support to Daenerys Targaryen after hearing that Yara and Theon Greyjoy have done the same. Later, Martell and Tyrell ships can be seen in Daenerys's fleet heading for Westeros.

=== Season 7 ===
Ellaria and the Sand Snakes arrive in Dragonstone to discuss the conquest of Westeros with Daenerys, though Ellaria remains at odds with Tyrion Lannister, who now serves as Daenerys's Hand and resents Ellaria for murdering Myrcella. Yara and Theon Greyjoy return Ellaria and the Sand Snakes to Dorne so they can gather their army. En route, Euron Greyjoy attacks them and burns Yara's fleet. He kills Obara and Nymeria, captures Yara, and takes Ellaria and Tyene prisoner. Euron drags the two through the streets of King's Landing, where they are jeered by the smallfolk for their roles in murdering Myrcella and the Martells, and presents them before Cersei in the Red Keep.

In the dungeons, Ellaria and Tyene are chained to the walls and gagged. Cersei recalls Oberyn Martell's death and explains how much she loved Myrcella. Though Ellaria briefly smirks about murdering Myrcella, Cersei kisses Tyene using the same poison that Ellaria used to murder Myrcella. She tells Ellaria that she will be watching Tyene die, and after Tyene's death, she will be kept alive to watch as her daughter's body rots away. As she is not seen again after this, she is presumed dead.

== Family tree ==
Family tree of House Martell

Princess of Dorne	Lewyn
Doran	Mellario of Norvos	Mors	Olyvar	Elia	Rhaegar; Targaryen	Ellaria; Sand	Oberyn "The Red Viper"
Arianne	Quentyn	Trystane	Rhaenys; Targaryen	Aegon; Targaryen	Obara; Sand	Nymeria; Sand	Tyene; Sand
Elia; Sand	Obella; Sand	Dorea; Sand	Loreza; Sand	Sarella; Sand
