= Olenna Tyrell =

Character in A Song of Ice and Fire

- A Song of Ice and Fire character Game of Thrones character
- Diana Rigg as Olenna Tyrell
- First appearance: Literature: A Storm of Swords (2000); Television: "Dark Wings, Dark Words" (2013)
- Last appearance: Television: "The Queen's Justice" (2017)
- Created by: George R. R. Martin
- Adapted by: David Benioff; D.B. Weiss; Vanessa Taylor
- Portrayed by: Diana Rigg

In-universe information
- Alias: Olenna Redwyne
- Nickname: The Queen of Thorns
- Gender: Female
- Title: Dowager Lady of Highgarden
- Family: House Redwyne; House Tyrell
- Spouse: Luthor Tyrell
- Children: Mace Tyrell; Mina Tyrell; Janna Tyrell
- Relatives: Runceford Redwyne (father); Willas Tyrell (grandson); Garlan Tyrell (grandson); Loras Tyrell (grandson); Margaery Tyrell (granddaughter); Horas Redwyne (grandson); Hobber Redwyne (grandson); Desmera Redwyne (granddaughter); Television: Viola Redwyne (sister)

Olenna Tyrell (née Redwyne) is a fictional character in the A Song of Ice and Fire series of high fantasy novels by American author George R. R. Martin, and its television adaptation, Game of Thrones.

Olenna is first mentioned in A Game of Thrones (1996) and appears in A Storm of Swords (2000) and A Feast for Crows (2005). She is the matriarch of the powerful House Tyrell, the largest and second wealthiest of the eight Great Houses of Westeros. Olenna is characterized by her cunning, ambition and sharp wit (the latter of which being the foundation for her title, the Queen of Thorns, with the Tyrell sigil of a rose). Although her family is allied with the Lannisters in King's Landing, she often finds her machinations at odds with theirs, especially those of Tywin Lannister. She, along with Petyr Baelish, is responsible for the death of King Joffrey Baratheon during his wedding to her granddaughter and protégé, Margaery.

In the HBO television adaptation, Olenna was portrayed by British actress Diana Rigg.

== Character profile ==
Born in 228 AC, Olenna Tyrell, also known as the Queen of Thorns, is the mother of Mace Tyrell, the lord of Highgarden and the lord paramount of the Reach. She is described as a wizened and cunning old woman with a wicked wit and a sharp tongue, and is known for openly stating her opinion.

Olenna is not a point of view character in the novels, so her actions are witnessed and interpreted through the eyes of other people, such as Sansa Stark and Cersei Lannister. Olenna is mostly a background character in the novels.

== Storylines ==
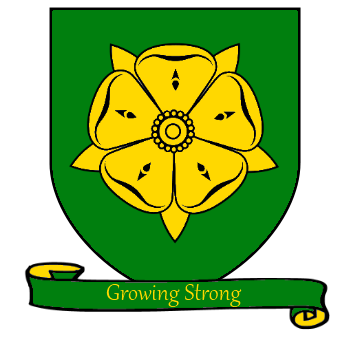
Coat of arms of House Tyrell

In A Storm of Swords, she plots to have Sansa taken to Highgarden to marry her grandson Willas. This plan is foiled by the Lannisters, who force Sansa to marry Tyrion Lannister. According to Littlefinger later in A Storm of Swords, in order to shield Margaery from King Joffrey's cruelty, Olenna had actually been the one who murdered Joffrey at his wedding. Margaery would later go on to marry the younger brother, Tommen Baratheon.

== TV adaptation ==
Lady Olenna, better known as "The Queen of Thorns", is the sharp-witted grandmother of Loras and Margaery. In the adaptation, Olenna is the matriarch of, and the true power behind, House Tyrell. She is also aware of and is generally unconcerned with her grandson Loras's homosexuality. Olenna implies that both closet matriarchy and tolerance of "sword-swallowers" are considered relatively normal in the Reach. She is notably one of the few characters that Tywin Lannister treats as an equal.

Olenna was played by the British actress Diana Rigg in the television adaption of the series of books. Commenting on the casting of Diana Rigg, David Benioff said “you don’t audition Dames, they audition you”. Rigg highly praised the show after being cast as Olenna, saying that she "couldn’t ask for better lines – I’m so lucky. I could be sitting at home crumbling but I'm not." Speaking on the character, Rigg said that Olenna "says all the things that other people dare not say".

Remarking on the series and the character:

I wasn't aware I was getting involved in something so huge. I really had no idea. She is also pretty evil; I'm good at evil.

Remarking on the costumes of the series:

Also the costume is terrific. I don’t have to spend hours in make-up and I’m in a wimple, it’s great. I adore it, I absolutely adore it.

Executive producer D. B. Weiss said of Rigg's final scene as Olenna, "What I love about the way she plays the scene is that even though you leave the scene knowing she’s soon going to be dead shortly after you cut to black you still feel like she won. She’s probably the only character to win her own death scene."

=== Season 3 ===
After learning the abuses Sansa Stark suffered at the hands of Joffrey, Olenna realised that Margaery could avoid the same fate by using Joffrey's love of violence. Varys warns Olenna that Petyr Baelish has designs on Sansa, who, given the death or disappearance of all her brothers, is now the key to the North. Olenna thus secretly plots to have Sansa marry Loras. Her plan is foiled by Loras, who accidentally reveals it to his new lover, one of Baelish's spies. Baelish informs Tywin Lannister, who has Sansa marry his son Tyrion Lannister instead. To secure the Reach, Tywin orders his daughter Cersei to marry Loras. Lady Olenna is at first against this because Cersei is too old (and therefore unlikely to have more children) and because of the scandal of her incestuous affair with her twin brother Jaime. After Tywin threatens to make Loras join the celibate Kingsguard, which would make Joffrey and Margaery's children the heirs of Reach, Olenna admits defeat and praises Tywin for getting the best of her.

Later, Tyrion, as Master of Coin, meets with Olenna to discuss the enormous cost of Joffrey and Margaery's wedding, hoping to get her to agree to scale back the plans she helped make for the event. Olenna reminds Tyrion that a royal wedding can distract the smallfolk from their discontent and is therefore worth the cost. She does, however, agree to have House Tyrell pay half the expenses for the wedding so the event can go on as planned.

=== Season 4 ===
Olenna conspires with Petyr Baelish to murder Joffrey, so as to protect Margaery from Joffrey's beastly nature – it is Olenna who actually does the deed, using a poison Petyr arranged to have smuggled into the wedding on Sansa's person. Quietly admitting her actions, Olenna advises Margaery to become acquainted with her new match, Tommen Baratheon, Joffrey's younger brother and heir, before Cersei turns him against her. Olenna returns to Highgarden shortly afterwards.

=== Season 5 ===
When Loras is arrested by the recently reinstated Faith Militant for his homosexuality, Margaery writes to her grandmother who returns to the capital to protect her grandchildren from Cersei's schemes. Mistakenly believing Loras's arrest was simply meant to humiliate House Tyrell, she helplessly assists Olyvar's testimony which incriminates her grandson, as well as to Margaery's incarceration for perjury in front of the gods to protect her brother. She later confronts the High Sparrow without result and has a secret meeting with Littlefinger who, blackmailed by Olenna for his part in Joffrey's death and to atone for his role in her grandchildren's imprisonment in providing Olyvar to Cersei, gives valuable information about Lancel and Cersei's adulterous relationship. This results in the latter's arrest by the Faith Militant.

=== Season 6 ===
Olenna takes steps to free Margaery from the High Sparrow and retake power from the Faith Militant but is thwarted when Tommen forges an alliance with the Faith and becomes the High Sparrow's new puppet. Margaery feigns loyalty and manages to instruct Olenna to leave the city when the High Sparrow threatens her life. Cersei's plotting ultimately causes the destruction of the Great Sept of Baelor, killing Margaery, Loras, Mace and the High Sparrow. A grieving Olenna is invited to Dorne to meet with Ellaria Sand, who has seized control of the region and rebelled against the Lannisters. In Dorne, Ellaria presents Varys, who persuades Olenna to support Daenerys Targaryen, having been a secret Targaryen loyalist all along. Olenna sends the Tyrell fleet to Meereen to assist in taking Daenerys' forces to Westeros.

=== Season 7 ===
During a meeting with Daenerys' allies at Dragonstone, Olenna shows her doubts about Tyrion Lannister's plan to attack King's Landing using the Tyrell and Dornish forces but eventually agrees. After the meeting, Daenerys asks Olenna to stay to talk with her. Daenerys acknowledges that Olenna has joined forces with her to exact revenge for her family and not out of any loyalty to her. Olenna advises Daenerys not to listen to "wise men" such as Tyrion, as that is how she has stayed alive all these years. She then tells her the lords of Westeros are all sheep and Daenerys is a dragon, so she should be a dragon. In "The Queen's Justice", Jaime Lannister seizes control of Highgarden on Cersei's orders. He confronts Olenna, granting her a painless death by poison, putting it in her cup of wine as she watches. She drinks the cup all at once and then admits her responsibility for Joffrey's death, wanting Cersei to know who had done it.

== Family tree of House Tyrell ==
Family tree of House Tyrell

Luthor	Olenna Redwyne	Gormon	Garth	Moryn
Mace	Alerie Hightower	Janna	Jon Fossoway	Mina	Paxter Redwyne	Garse Flowers	Garrett Flowers	Luthor	Elyn Norridge	Leo "The Lazy"
Willas	Garlan	Leonette Fossoway	Horas; Redwyne	Hobber; Redwyne	Desmera; Redwyne	Theodore	Lia Serry	Olene	Leo Blackbar	Medwick
Loras	Margaery	Renly Baratheon	Elinor	Luthor
Joffrey; Baratheon
Tommen; Baratheon
