= Myrcella Baratheon =

- A Song of Ice and Fire character Game of Thrones character
- Nell Tiger Free as Myrcella Baratheon
- First appearance: Literature: A Game of Thrones (1996); Television: "Winter Is Coming" (2011)
- Last appearance: Television: "Home" (2016)
- Created by: George R. R. Martin
- Adapted by: David Benioff; D. B. Weiss
- Portrayed by: Aimee Richardson (child); Nell Tiger Free (adolescent)

In-universe information
- Gender: Female
- Family: House Lannister; House Baratheon (false)
- Relatives: Cersei Lannister (mother); Jaime Lannister (biological father); Robert Baratheon (legal father); Joffrey Baratheon (brother); Tommen Baratheon (brother); Tywin Lannister (grandfather); Joanna Lannister (grandmother); Tyrion Lannister (uncle); Kevan Lannister (granduncle); Mya Stone (legal half-sister); Bella (legal half-sister); Gendry (legal half-brother); Edric Storm (legal half-brother); Barra (legal half-sister); Other legal half-siblings; Steffon Baratheon (legal grandfather); Cassana Estermont (legal grandmother); Stannis Baratheon (legal uncle); Renly Baratheon (legal uncle); Shireen Baratheon (legal cousin)

Myrcella Baratheon is a fictional character in the A Song of Ice and Fire series of epic fantasy novels by American author George R. R. Martin and its television adaptation, Game of Thrones. Myrcella's character, development, interactions, and impact differ greatly between the two media.

Introduced in 1996's A Game of Thrones, Myrcella is the only daughter of Cersei Lannister from the kingdom of Westeros. She subsequently appeared in Martin's A Clash of Kings (1998) and A Feast for Crows (2005).

Myrcella is portrayed by Irish actress Aimee Richardson in the first two seasons of the HBO television adaptation, while English actress Nell Tiger Free portrays her in the show's fifth and sixth seasons.

== Character ==
Since Myrcella Baratheon is not a point-of-view character in A Song of Ice and Fire, the audience learns about her through other characters' perspectives, such as that of her uncle Tyrion Lannister. She is a background character in the books.

== Storylines ==
=== A Game of Thrones ===
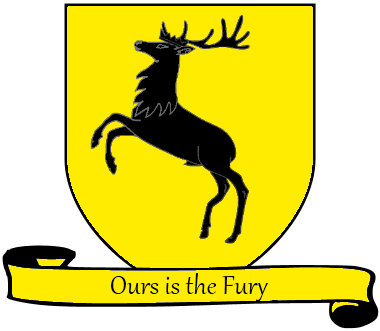
Coat of arms of House Baratheon

Myrcella is introduced in A Game of Thrones (1996) as the only daughter of Queen Cersei Lannister and King Robert Baratheon. In her first appearance, she accompanies her parents, her two brothers (Joffrey and Tommen Baratheon), her uncle Tyrion, and her 'uncle' Jaime Lannister to Winterfell, where Robert asks Eddard "Ned" Stark to be his new Hand of the King. She later attends the tournament to celebrate Eddard's inauguration into the position. While investigating Jon Arryn's death, Ned discovers that Myrcella and her brothers are the products of an incestuous affair between twins Cersei and Jaime.

=== A Clash of Kings ===
In 1998's A Clash of Kings, Myrcella attends Joffrey's first nameday as king. She greets her uncle Tyrion and tells him that she is glad that the rumors of his death were false. During the War of the Five Kings, Tyrion makes plans to forge an alliance with House Martell of Dorne by having Myrcella wed to Trystane Martell, the youngest son of the current ruler of Dorne, Doran Martell, but part of the arrangement involved sending her to Dorne to live in the Martell household.

=== A Feast for Crows ===
During A Storm of Swords (2000), Trystane's sister Arianne Martell plans to crown Myrcella as Robert's heir instead of Tommen, hoping to incite the Dornishmen to rebel against the Lannisters to seat her on the Iron Throne. However, Doran Martell has been tipped off to the conspiracy, and his men ambush Arianne's party as they attempt to sail up the Greenblood. In the ensuing confrontation, one of Arianne's co-conspirators, Ser Gerold "Darkstar" Dayne, attempts to kill Myrcella; although unsuccessful, he cuts off one of her ears and leaves her scarred.

=== A Dance with Dragons ===
In A Dance with Dragons (2011), Myrcella travels back to King's Landing with Nymeria Sand.

== TV adaptation ==
=== Overview ===
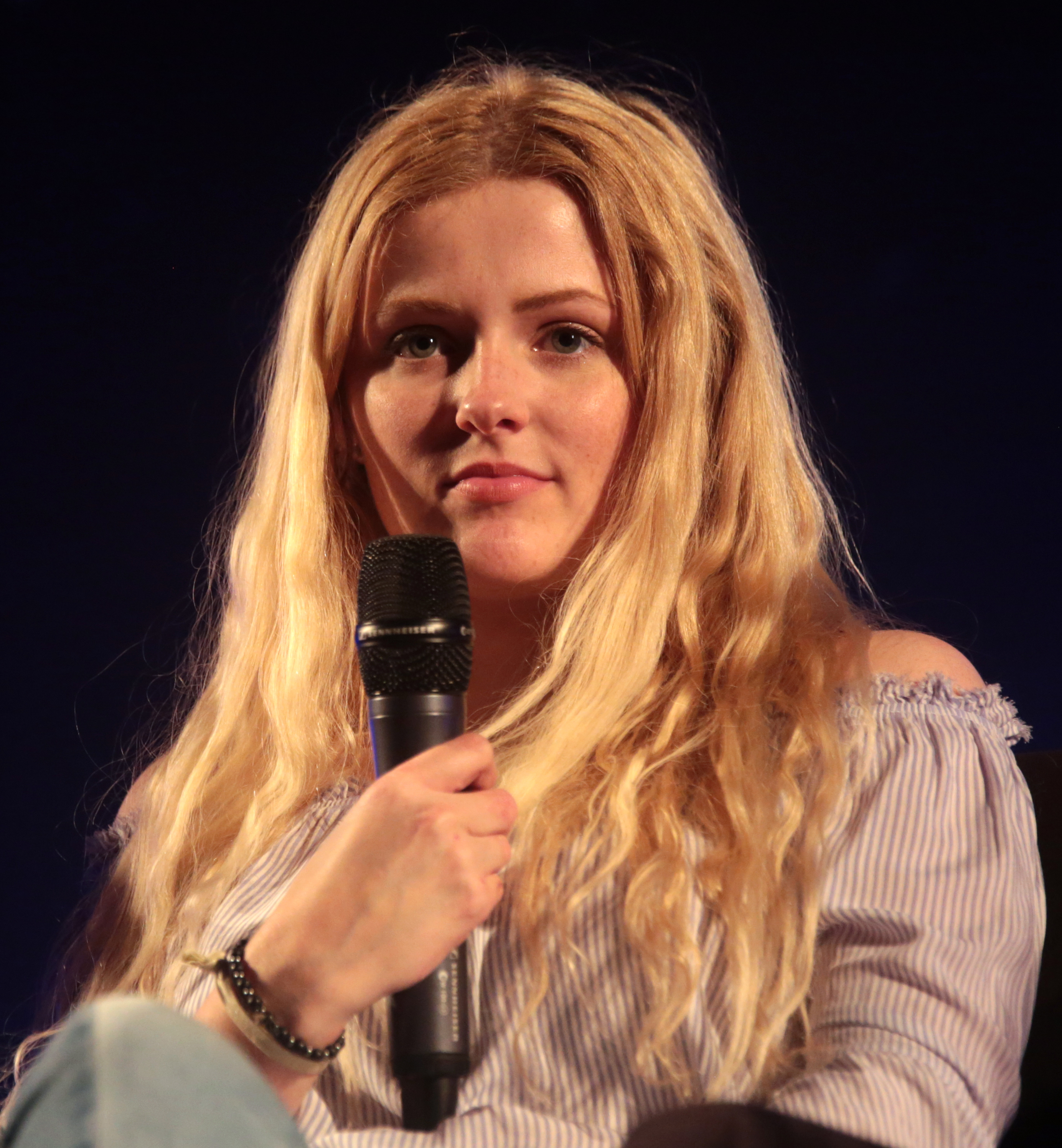
Aimee Richardson

In the HBO television adaptation, Aimee Richardson portrayed Myrcella for the first two seasons. Initially cast as a stand-in, Richardson impressed the crew enough to be kept as a full cast member; she appeared in eight episodes. Nell Tiger Free played Myrcella for seasons five and six. Prior to her audition, Free had never seen the show; when talking about the role, she said: "I mean, it's every kid's dream to play a princess, and the dresses were fantastic." Richardson learned about the recasting at San Diego Comic-Con, posting a Vine video in response in which she wore a crown and held a sign reading "Princess for Hire". An explanation was not given by producers for the change in actors.

Myrcella's fate was one of several differences between how the television show and the novels represented the Sand Snakes and Dorne. Her death scene was originally longer with parallels to Joffrey's death; it would have involved her head exploding and gore splattered throughout the set. Discussing these changes, Free said that David Benioff and D. B. Weiss "wanted Myrcella's death to reflect her life, and wanted it to be sweet—which is rare for [Game of] Thrones." Esquire's Matt Miller wrote that the final version was tamer in comparison to other characters' deaths. Free appeared in six episodes of the show.

=== Storylines ===
==== Season 1 and 2 ====
Myrcella's storyline in the first two seasons follows the books. Myrcella makes her debut, looking "like a Disney Princess" as she arrives with the Lannisters at Winterfell in the series premiere. She is later seen along with her brother Tommen Baratheon at Joffrey's nameday celebration. Tyrion later sends her off to Dorne to marry into House Martell, with the intended result being a Martell–Lannister alliance.

==== Season 5 and 6 ====
Myrcella, now much older, is seen walking through the Water Gardens with Trystane Martell, with whom she has fallen in love, while being watched by Ellaria Sand and Prince Doran Martell. Ellaria, furious over Oberyn's death, offers to torture Myrcella and send pieces of her back to King's Landing as revenge against Cersei, whom she blames for orchestrating Tyrion's show trial-by-combat, which led to Oberyn's death. Doran refuses to harm her. Myrcella is surprised when her 'uncle' Jaime Lannister and Bronn finally meet her while she is with Trystane in the gardens. She becomes upset after Bronn is forced to knock Trystane unconscious and resists Jaime's urge to leave with him. The Sand Snakes suddenly ambush her in an attempt to kidnap her. She is nearly taken hostage by Nymeria, but the conflict is halted when Areo Hotah arrives with a dozen Dornish guards, imprisoning Jaime, Bronn, the Sand Snakes, and Ellaria. Myrcella visits Jaime while he is in custody. He tells her about the situation with Ellaria and that he needs to take her home to King's Landing. Not understanding, she insists that Dorne is her home now and that she will stay and marry Trystane. However, her marriage to Trystane never occurs because she is poisoned by Ellaria and the Sand Snakes just before she leaves Dorne with Jaime and Bronn. As she sails toward King's Landing, she dies in Jaime's arms moments after recognizing him as her father. (Note: At least one writer opines that Myrcella's relationship with Jaime abruptly failed, like so many other match-ups in the television series, because of a lack of good writing. Others say that in Game of Thrones, Myrcella's loving relationship, like many others, seem doomed to fall victim to political grudges of other characters. Although her "star-crossed" dalliance with Trystane is viewed as "passionate" but "boring", both are murdered "to keep the plot moving.") In episode 2 of season 6, her body returns home to King's Landing shortly after her death, and her corpse, complete with stones over her eyes, is later seen in the Great Sept of Baelor. Myrcella is later avenged by Euron Greyjoy, who kills Obara and Nymeria in combat and delivers Ellaria and Tyene to Cersei to exact her revenge.

=== Family tree of House Lannister ===
Descendants of Tytos Lannister

Tytos	Jeyne; Marbrand
Joanna	Tywin	Emmon; Frey	Genna	Kevan	Dorna; Swyft	Tygett	Darlessa; Marbrand	Gerion	Briony
Robert; Baratheon	Cersei	Jaime	Tysha (Note: Tyrion's first wife was a peasant girl named Tysha. The marriage was later annulled by Lord Tywin's order.)	Tyrion	Sansa; Stark	Amerei; Frey	Lancel	Martyn	Willem	Janei	Tyrek	Ermesande; Hayford	Joy; Hill
Joffrey; Baratheon (Note: Though officially Robert's children, Joffrey, Myrcella and Tommen are the products of an incestuous affair between Cersei and Jaime.)	Myrcella; Baratheon	Margaery; Tyrell	Tommen; Baratheon	Tion; Frey	"Red" Walder; Frey	Jeyne; Darry	Cleos; Frey	Lyonel; Frey	Melesa Crakehall
Tywin; Frey	Willem; Frey

References and notes:
