= Oberyn Martell =

- A Song of Ice and Fire character Game of Thrones character
- Pedro Pascal as Oberyn Martell
- First appearance: Novel: A Storm of Swords (2000); Television: "Two Swords" (2014)
- Last appearance: Novel: A Storm of Swords (2000); Television: "The Mountain and the Viper" (2014)
- Created by: George R. R. Martin
- Portrayed by: Pedro Pascal

In-universe information
- Alias: The Red Viper of Dorne
- Gender: Male
- Titles: Prince; Ser
- Family: House Martell
- Significant other: Ellaria Sand (paramour)
- Children: Obara Sand; Nymeria Sand; Tyene Sand; Sarella Sand; Elia Sand; Obella Sand; Dorea Sand; Loreza Sand
- Relatives: Princess of Dorne (mother); Doran Martell (brother); Elia Martell (sister); Lady Mellario of Norvos (sister-in-law); Arianne Martell (niece); Quentyn Martell (nephew); Trystane Martell (nephew); Rhaenys Targaryen (niece); Aegon Targaryen (nephew); Lewyn Martell (uncle)

Oberyn Nymeros Martell, nicknamed the Red Viper, is a fictional character in the A Song of Ice and Fire series of epic fantasy novels by American author George R. R. Martin and its television adaptation, Game of Thrones, in which he is portrayed by Pedro Pascal.

Introduced in 2000's A Storm of Swords, Oberyn is the youngest brother of Doran and Elia Martell from the desert kingdom of Dorne. Unlike his sickly and pensive brother, Oberyn is notorious for both his dangerous and unpredictable nature and his affinity for poisons, for which he earned his nickname. He is subsequently sporadically mentioned in A Feast for Crows and A Dance with Dragons. As his brother is sickly, he travels to King's Landing in his place in order to claim the Dornish seat on the small council, as well as to seek vengeance for his sister Elia's death at the hands of Ser Gregor Clegane, whom he suspects acted directly on orders from Tywin Lannister.

== Character description ==
Oberyn Martell is the younger brother of Prince Doran Martell, the ruler of the southern principality of Dorne. He is a hotheaded, forceful, and lustful man with a quick wit and a barbed tongue. He is a formidable fighter whose "legend was fearsome" and is nicknamed the "Red Viper" because of his preference for red clothing, as well as rumors of his use of poisoned weapons in duels. Tywin Lannister described Oberyn as having "always been half-mad"; Oberyn's brother, Doran, has described him as "ever the viper", "deadly, dangerous, unpredictable", and that "no man dared tread on him", and Oberyn himself admitted being a "bloodthirsty man". Oberyn was also responsible for the crippling of Willas Tyrell, the heir of House Tyrell of Highgarden, during a joust. However, Willas never blamed Oberyn for the accident, and the two remained friends.

When Oberyn was no more than sixteen years old, he was found in bed with the paramour of old Lord Edgar Yronwood, who challenged Oberyn to a duel. The fight was limited to drawing first blood and ended after both men took cuts, but Oberyn soon recovered while Lord Yronwood died of a festering wound, and it was rumored that Oberyn used a poisoned blade. To make peace with House Yronwood, Doran sent his son Quentyn Martell to Yronwood as a ward and sent Oberyn away to Oldtown, then overseas to Lys in temporary exile. Afterward, Oberyn traveled the world, served in the famous sellsword company Second Sons before founding a company of his own, and briefly studied poisons and dark arts as a novice at the Citadel, managing to obtain six links of the maester's chain before quitting due to boredom. He is bisexual and has eight illegitimate daughters, collectively known as the "Sand Snakes". He was very close to his older sister, Elia, and consequently seeks revenge on Ser Gregor Clegane for her death.

== Storylines ==
=== Books ===
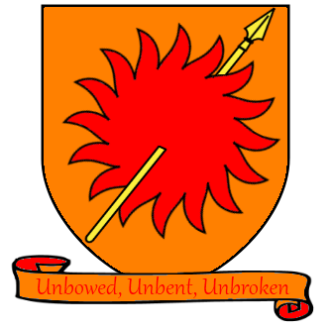
Coat of arms of House Martell

Oberyn Martell is not a point-of-view character in the novels, His actions are directly observed and interpreted from Tyrion Lannister's perspective in the third book. In the subsequent books, he is mentioned from the viewpoints of his niece Arianne Martell and the Norvosi captain Areo Hotah, who serves Doran's royal guard in the fourth and fifth books.

==== A Storm of Swords ====
Oberyn leads a Dornish envoy to King's Landing to claim a seat on the Crown's small council on Prince Doran's behalf and to seek justice for the murder of his sister, Elia Martell, as was agreed with the then-acting Hand of the King Tyrion Lannister, who is now assigned as the master of coin. When Tyrion is accused of murdering King Joffrey Baratheon, Oberyn volunteers to champion Tyrion in a trial by combat, allowing him to fight and seek revenge on the rival champion, Ser Gregor "the Mountain" Clegane, who is Elia's murderer. Although Oberyn manages to gain the upper hand in the duel and impale Clegane to the ground with his spear, Clegane manages to surprise him by foot sweeping him to the ground, bear-hugging him, gouging out his eyes, and finally killing him by repeatedly smashing his unarmored face (Oberyn is wearing a light visorless halfhelm) with a mailed fist. However, it is later revealed that Oberyn has coated his spear in manticore venom to ensure that Clegane will die a slow and agonizing death.

==== A Feast for Crows and A Dance with Dragons ====
When news of Oberyn's death reaches Dorne, the oldest three Sand Snakes, Obara, Nymeria, and Tyene, unsuccessfully attempt to pressure Prince Doran into declaring war against the Iron Throne. Doran's estranged daughter, Arianne Martell, then conspires with her three cousins to instate Myrcella Baratheon as queen and create a war of succession against Tommen Baratheon and House Lannister. Doran foils their plan, and Areo Hotah arrests them all. Doran later reveals to Arianne that Oberyn has actually been acting as Doran's enforcer all along to carry out his secret, grand plan for House Lannister's downfall. The three Sand Snakes are later also told about the plan, released after swearing allegiance to Doran's strategy, and assigned individual missions to infiltrate the Iron Throne as sleeper agents, while Arianne is sent to Griffin's Roost to meet a young man named "Young Griff" who claims to be her deceased cousin Aegon III Targaryen.

=== TV adaptation ===
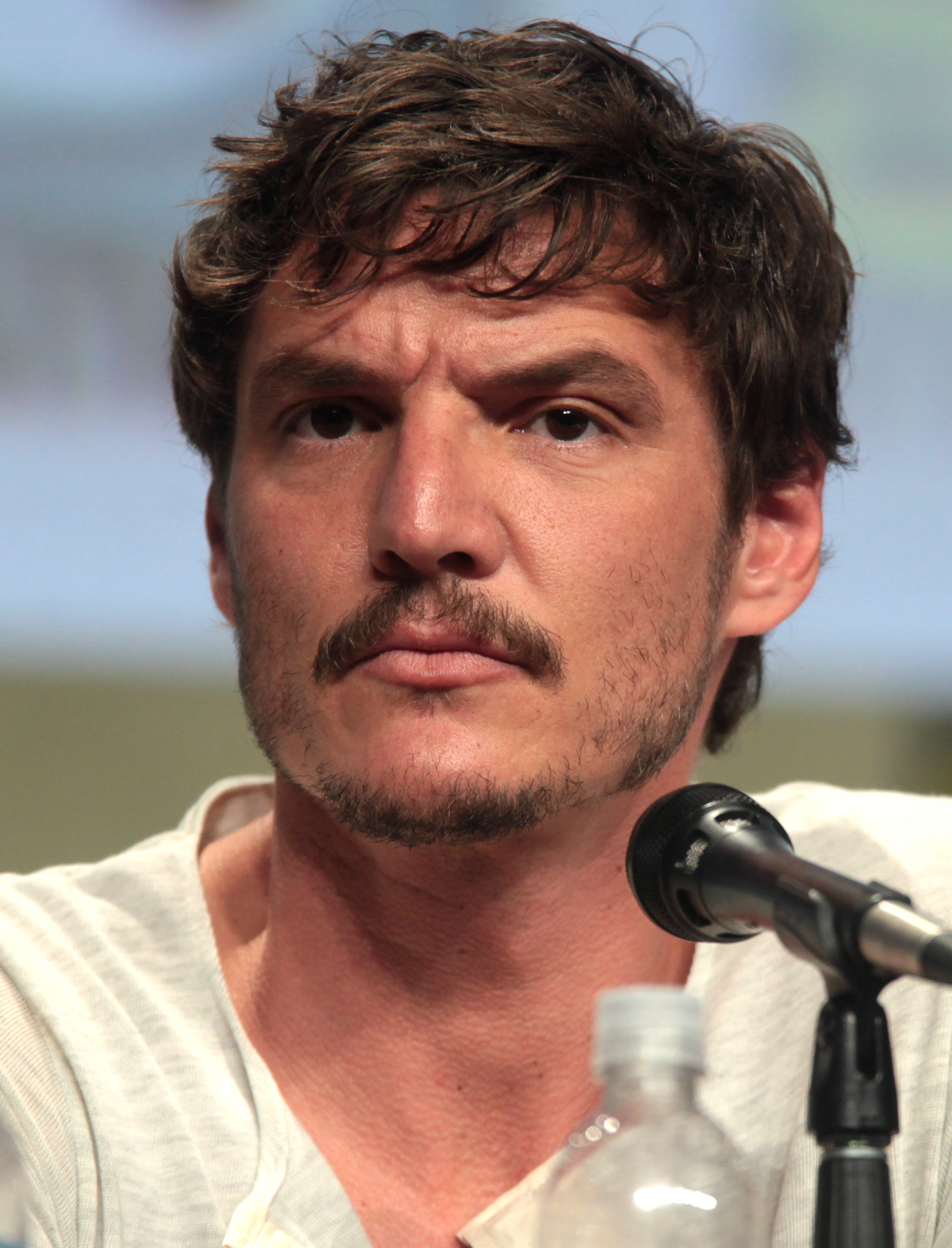
Pedro Pascal plays the role of Oberyn Martell in the television series.

Oberyn Martell is played by Chilean-American actor Pedro Pascal in the fourth season of the HBO television adaptation.

Oberyn arrives in King's Landing with his paramour, Ellaria Sand, to attend Joffrey's wedding in his brother's stead, and his meeting with Tyrion makes it clear that he has actually come to take revenge against the Lannisters for their role in the deaths of his sister, nephew, and niece. At the wedding, Joffrey dies after being poisoned. Tywin initially suspects Oberyn of having a hand in the murder since Oberyn has a background in poison chemistry, while Oberyn denies involvement and accuses Tywin of ordering Gregor Clegane to rape and murder Elia. The two reach a settlement when Tywin promises Oberyn a meeting with Clegane in exchange for Oberyn serving as one of the three judges at Tyrion's trial. At the trial, Oberyn implies that he is not convinced of Tyrion's guilt, and openly questions Cersei's testimony and asks Shae why Tyrion would tell her about all of his plans to murder Joffrey if he was the perpetrator.

When Tyrion demands a trial by combat, and Gregor Clegane is chosen as Cersei's champion, Oberyn volunteers to fight for Tyrion, proclaiming that he will exact his vengeance, starting with Ser Gregor. Martell valiantly fights Clegane; his superior speed makes up for Clegane's size, and he wounds him in the shoulder and leg, knocking him down. Refusing to kill him immediately, Oberyn furiously demands that Clegane admit to raping and killing Elia and her children, and that the order came from Tywin himself. Distracted for a moment, Oberyn is floored by Clegane, who—in a manner self-admittedly paraphrasing the murder of Elia—knocks out his teeth, straddles him, and slowly gouges out his eyes, admitting to the rape and murder of Elia before crushing his skull. Tyrion is subsequently sentenced to death, but Oberyn's objective of vengeance was not in vain, since his spear is revealed to have been laced with the deadly venom of the manticore, which later begins to kill Clegane. Qyburn is charged with reviving the dying knight and does, though Clegane is now reduced to a mute zombie of his former self. Years later, in a battle with his brother, Sandor "the Hound" Clegane, Gregor Clegane attempts to use the same move that he used to kill Oberyn against his brother; however, the Hound stabs him in the head before he can finish and sacrifices himself to push the Mountain out the side of the crumbling building, with both of them falling to their deaths in the flames of a dragon.

=== Reception ===
Pedro Pascal garnered positive reviews for his role as Martell in the television show. For his performance, Pascal was nominated for the NewNowNext Award for Best New Television Actor, and, as part of the ensemble cast, the Screen Actors Guild Award for Outstanding Performance by an Ensemble in a Drama Series.

== Family tree of House Martell ==
Family tree of House Martell

Princess of Dorne	Lewyn
Doran	Mellario of Norvos	Mors	Olyvar	Elia	Rhaegar; Targaryen	Ellaria; Sand	Oberyn "The Red Viper"
Arianne	Quentyn	Trystane	Rhaenys; Targaryen	Aegon; Targaryen	Obara; Sand	Nymeria; Sand	Tyene; Sand
Elia; Sand	Obella; Sand	Dorea; Sand	Loreza; Sand	Sarella; Sand
