= Margaery Tyrell =

Character in A Song of Ice and Fire

- A Song of Ice and Fire character Game of Thrones character
- Natalie Dormer as Margaery Tyrell
- First appearance: Literature: A Clash of Kings (1998); Television: "What Is Dead May Never Die" (2012); Video game: "Iron From Ice" (2014)
- Last appearance: Television: "The Winds of Winter" (2016); Video game: "The Ice Dragon" (2015)
- Created by: George R. R. Martin
- Portrayed by: Natalie Dormer
- Voiced by: Natalie Dormer
- Motion capture: Natalie Dormer

In-universe information
- Aliases: The Little Queen; The Little Rose; Maid Margaery
- Gender: Female
- Title: Queen of the Seven Kingdoms
- Family: House Tyrell; House Baratheon; House Lannister
- Spouses: Renly Baratheon; Joffrey Baratheon (unconsummated); Tommen Baratheon
- Relatives: Mace Tyrell (father); Alerie Tyrell (mother); Willas Tyrell (brother); Garlan Tyrell (brother); Loras Tyrell (brother); Luthor Tyrell (grandfather); Olenna Redwyne (grandmother); Leyton Hightower (grandfather); Lynesse Hightower (aunt); Jorah Mormont (uncle by marriage)

Margaery Tyrell is a fictional character in the A Song of Ice and Fire series of epic fantasy novels by American author George R. R. Martin, and its television adaptation Game of Thrones, where she is portrayed by English actress Natalie Dormer. Margaery is first mentioned in A Game of Thrones (1996) and first appears in A Clash of Kings (1998). She subsequently appeared in A Storm of Swords (2000) and A Feast for Crows (2005).

Margaery is a member of the House Tyrell, the second wealthiest and largest of the eight Great Houses in Westeros. She is the younger sister of Lord Willas Tyrell, the heir to Highgarden, Ser Garlan the Gallant, as well as Ser Loras Tyrell, the Knight of Flowers. She is close to her paternal grandmother Lady Olenna, the Queen of Thorns, originally of House Redwyne. Like her grandmother, Margaery is shrewd, ambitious and adaptable, and uses her beauty, generosity and family influence to secure power for herself. Having wed herself to three kings over the course of the narrative, she becomes an influential political figure in Westeros, which often brings her into conflict with her chief rival at court, Cersei Lannister.

== Character overview ==
=== Book series ===
Margaery is the only daughter of Alerie Hightower and Mace Tyrell, the Lord of Highgarden in the Reach. Her older brothers are the heir Willas, Garlan, and Loras, the Knight of Flowers, who is a member of the Kingsguard. One of the wealthiest and most powerful families in Westeros, House Tyrell is actually guided by the willful Lady Olenna, Mace's mother, who has arranged Margaery's marriages and mentors her in politics and court intrigue. Margaery Tyrell is not a point-of-view character in the novels, so her actions are witnessed and interpreted through the eyes of Sansa Stark and Cersei Lannister.

=== Television series ===
In HBO's Game of Thrones, Margaery's backstory and plotline in the early seasons remain largely unchanged from the novels, though the character is more prominent in the series, and this version of Margaery is an adult as opposed to a teenager. Margaery first appears in the second season, following her marriage to Renly; she is well aware that her marriage is a political one, and displays pragmatism regarding Renly's homosexuality and his relationship with her brother Loras.

== Storylines ==
=== A Clash of Kings ===
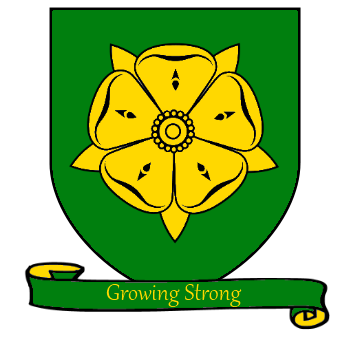
Coat of arms of House Tyrell

Margaery first appears in A Clash of Kings (1998), having married Renly Baratheon and supporting his claim to the Iron Throne. After Renly's assassination, the Tyrells switch allegiance, and Margaery is instead offered to wed King Joffrey Baratheon.

=== A Storm of Swords ===
In A Storm of Swords (2000), she becomes popular among the citizens of King's Landing through her various charitable activities. Margaery forms an amiable relationship with the King's ex-fiancée, Sansa Stark, and through Sansa she learns much about Joffrey's true nature. Margaery weds Joffrey, but he is poisoned at their wedding feast.

=== A Feast for Crows ===
In A Feast for Crows (2005), Margaery marries Joffrey's younger brother, Tommen Baratheon, and encourages him to assert himself as king. Margaery's growing influence over Tommen puts her in a bitter power struggle with his mother, Cersei Lannister, which eventually culminates in Cersei framing Margaery for adultery.

=== A Dance with Dragons ===
In A Dance with Dragons (2011), it is mentioned that Margaery has been released from prison and placed under house arrest, where she awaits trial.

== TV adaptation ==
=== Season 2 ===
Margaery, newly married to Renly, reveals that she is aware of his romantic relationship with her brother and is willing to work around his desires to secure their alliance and her position. Following Renly's assassination, Margaery indicates to Petyr Baelish that she is aware that her brother-in-law, Stannis Baratheon, is more likely to be behind the assassination than Brienne of Tarth, the official suspect. She also makes it clear that her ambition is to be the queen of Westeros and that she will not settle for anything less.

=== Season 3 ===
Margaery has relocated to King's Landing and taken up residence in the Red Keep. She swiftly proves that she is one of the few people capable of managing Joffrey, which pleases his grandfather, Tywin Lannister, but makes her an enemy of Cersei. The series also expands on Margaery's friendship with Sansa Stark, though her motives are unclear, and Margaery swiftly replaces Sansa as Joffrey's fiancée. Through several shrewd public relations moves towards the city's poor and orphaned, Margaery becomes extremely popular with the common people as their future queen.

=== Season 4 ===
Margaery marries Joffrey but is widowed hours later when he is poisoned at the wedding feast. Soon after, Margaery's grandmother, Olenna, reveals herself as masterminding the poisoning, but Margaery, now aware that Tyrion Lannister's trial is a farce, keeps quiet. Arrangements are made to wed Margaery to Joffrey's younger brother, Tommen, to whom Margaery swiftly ingratiates herself. Cersei and Margaery continue their bitter rivalry; Cersei resents being displaced as Queen and being forced to marry her very young child to the much older Margaery, while Margaery tries to outmaneuver her.

=== Season 5 ===
Margaery and Tommen marry, and she finally becomes the queen of the Seven Kingdoms. She taunts Cersei over her triumph and exhorts Tommen to send Cersei away from the capital. Cersei, in a shortsighted attempt to get rid of her rival, consents for the Faith of the Seven to once again bear arms. Cersei intends for the zealously fervent religious order to seize and condemn Loras for his homosexual behavior, thus tricking Margaery into perjuring herself by denying knowledge of his proclivities. Margaery finds herself arrested and awaiting trial, although Cersei is arrested as well for her unrelated charges (i.e., her incestuous behavior).

=== Season 6 ===
After a period of captivity, Margaery is permitted to visit Loras in his cell. She discovers that he is beginning to break under the Faith's questioning and that the meeting is a ploy to break her, too. Jaime Lannister leads the Tyrell army on the Sept of Baelor to secure Margaery's release, but it is revealed that she has been absolved by convincing Tommen to forge an alliance between the Faith and the Crown. To placate Cersei, Margaery surreptitiously convinces Olenna to return to Highgarden, subtly indicating that she is still loyal to House Tyrell. She later persuades the High Sparrow, the leader of the Faith, to release Loras if he surrenders his claim as heir of House Tyrell and joins the Faith. However, when Cersei fails to arrive for her trial, Margaery deduces Cersei is plotting something. Panicking, she desperately tries to convince the High Sparrow to evacuate the Sept of Baelor, but the High Sparrow refuses and has the Faith Militant bar the exits. Moments later, wildfire set beneath the Sept by Qyburn on Cersei's orders is ignited, causing the entire Sept and its surroundings to be engulfed in flames. Margaery is killed instantly, along with hundreds of others who were present. Margaery's death and those of her brother and father lead Olenna to accept a proposal by the Sand Snakes (who currently lead the Reach's ancient rival, Dorne) in supporting Daenerys Targaryen's invasion of Westeros.

== Family tree of House Tyrell ==
Family tree of House Tyrell

Luthor	Olenna Redwyne	Gormon	Garth	Moryn
Mace	Alerie Hightower	Janna	Jon Fossoway	Mina	Paxter Redwyne	Garse Flowers	Garrett Flowers	Luthor	Elyn Norridge	Leo "The Lazy"
Willas	Garlan	Leonette Fossoway	Horas; Redwyne	Hobber; Redwyne	Desmera; Redwyne	Theodore	Lia Serry	Olene	Leo Blackbar	Medwick
Loras	Margaery	Renly Baratheon	Elinor	Luthor
Joffrey; Baratheon
Tommen; Baratheon

== Reception ==
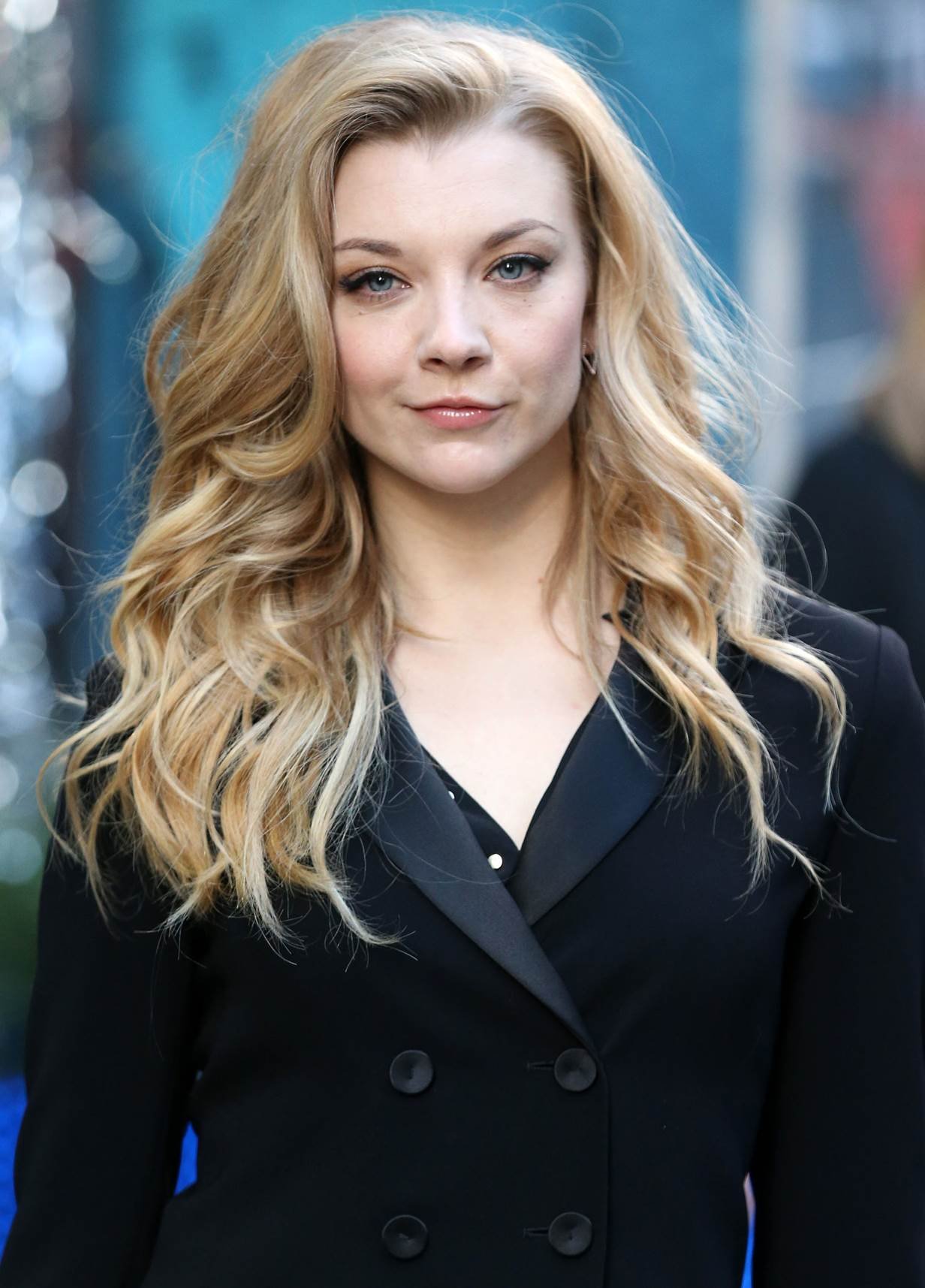
Natalie Dormer plays the role of Margaery Tyrell in the television series.

Adam Whitehead of the wertzone feels Margaery's rivalry with Cersei Lannister is a major driving force in A Feast for Crows. Sean T. Collins writing for Rolling Stone feels that author Martin has been vague about Margaery's ambition and political cunning and describes her as a "mute mystery whose motives and level of involvement in the game of thrones are unknown [by A Clash of Kings]". Other writers feel Margaery's political ambition is more obvious. Madeline of Feministing considers Margaery "an ambitious politico as well as being a damn good actress – she plays the part of the tragic, virginal twice-widow so well that almost no one suspects that she is dead set on winning the throne. ... Margaery uses her womanhood to her advantage, knowing that producing an heir will shoot her to power." Similarly, Danica Liu writing for The Duke Chronicle describes Margaery as "subtle and graceful" and like most of the women in A Song of Ice and Fire, deals in the currencies of power.

David Sims writing for The A.V. Club enjoyed the introduction of Margaery's character in the Game of Thrones episode "What Is Dead May Never Die", commenting; "the fun twist to this plot is that Margaery Tyrell is obviously not the blushing maiden she appears to be, but an operator just like everyone else", adding that her introduction is an example of the series "rarely trafficking in cliched characterization." Jenna Busch of Zap2it calls Margaery a "power player" who will "do anything to stay on the throne." In "Valar Dohaeris", Diana Huang of UC Riverside's Highlander News appreciated the development of Margaery's character and called her "self aware and quick-witted" and believes she has the power to wreak havoc in King's Landing.

Commentators notice Margaery's desire and ability to gain the support of the public, and Margaery has been cited as a prominent example of the story's strong feminist themes. Natalie Dormer, the actress who plays Margaery, discussed Margaery's political savviness:

Margaery brings this whole new element to the Game that you haven't seen before, which is basically PR. It's quite a modern ethos on PR and courting public affections, hopefully. We've all seen politicians kiss babies. It doesn't mean that she's insincere in her genuine hope to do charitable work and it's just an interesting new comment on how you handle the masses and how you win power that maybe we haven't seen in Westeros before.

She also noted that Margaery comes from a matriarchal family and "that she's more cut from the cloth as a protegee of her grandmother, so she knows what it's like for a woman to be in charge."

For her performance in the show, Natalie Dormer, along with the rest of the ensemble cast, was nominated for four Screen Actors Guild Award for Outstanding Performance by an Ensemble in a Drama Series in 2012, 2014, 2015, and 2016, respectively, and the cast was awarded the Empire Hero Award in 2015 by the British film magazine Empire. For her performance in the third season of the show, Dormer won the Ewwy Award for Best Supporting Actress - Drama.
