= A Feast for Crows =

Novel by George R. R. Martin

- US hardcover (first edition)
- Author: George R. R. Martin
- Audio read by: John Lee (2005); Roy Dotrice (2011)
- Language: English
- Series: A Song of Ice and Fire
- Release number: 4
- Genre: Fantasy
- Published: 2005 (Voyager Books/UK & Bantam Spectra/US)
- Publication place: United States
- Pages: 753
- ISBN: 0-00-224743-7 (UK hardback); ISBN 0-553-80150-3 (US hardback)
- OCLC: 61261403
- Dewey Decimal: 813/.54 22
- LC Class: PS3563.A7239 F39 2005
- Preceded by: A Storm of Swords
- Followed by: A Dance with Dragons

A Feast for Crows is the fourth of seven planned novels in the epic fantasy series A Song of Ice and Fire by American author George R. R. Martin. The novel was first published in the United Kingdom on October 17, 2005, with a United States edition following on November 8, 2005.

Because of its size, Martin and his publishers split the narrative of the still-unfinished manuscript for A Feast for Crows into two books. Rather than divide the text chronologically in half, Martin instead split the material by plot location, resulting in "two novels taking place simultaneously" with different casts of characters. A Feast for Crows was published months later, focusing mainly on southern Westeros. The concurrent novel A Dance with Dragons, which focuses on other locations such as the North, the Wall, and Essos, was advertised for the following year but was eventually released six years later in 2011. Martin noted that the A Song of Ice and Fire series would now likely total seven novels.

A Feast for Crows was the first novel in the series to debut at number one on The New York Times Best Seller list, a feat among fantasy writers only previously achieved by Robert Jordan and Neil Gaiman. In 2006, the novel was nominated for the Hugo Award, the Locus Award, and the British Fantasy Award. It has since been adapted, along with A Dance With Dragons, for television as the fifth season of Game of Thrones, though elements of the novel appeared in the series' fourth and sixth seasons.

== Plot summary ==
The War of the Five Kings is slowly coming to an end. The secessionist kings Robb Stark and Balon Greyjoy are dead. One claimant to the throne, Stannis Baratheon, has gone to fight off invading wildling tribes at the northern Wall, where Robb's half-brother, Jon Snow, has become the 998th Lord Commander of the Night's Watch, the order responsible for guarding the Wall. The eight-year-old King Tommen Baratheon now rules in King's Landing under the regency of his mother, Cersei Lannister. The warrior woman Brienne of Tarth has been sent by Cersei's brother (and lover) Jaime Lannister on a mission to find Robb's sister Sansa Stark. Sansa is hiding in the Vale of Arryn, protected by her mother's childhood friend Petyr "Littlefinger" Baelish, who has murdered his wife (and her aunt), Lysa Arryn, and named himself Protector of the Vale and guardian of Lysa's son, the eight-year-old Lord Robert Arryn.

=== Prologue ===
Pate is a young apprentice at the Citadel in Oldtown, training to become a member of the ancient order of scholar-healers known as maesters. At a stranger's request, he has stolen an important key to a depository of books and records. After turning over the stolen key and receiving the reward of a gold coin, he bites the coin and dies abruptly from poisoning.

=== King's Landing ===
Following the death of Tywin Lannister, the late Hand of the King, Queen Cersei's regency is marked by rampant cronyism, and her councils are staffed with incompetent officials and unreliable sycophants. She disregards advice from her uncle Kevan Lannister and her brother Jaime, alienating them both. Making matters worse is Cersei's increasing distrust of the powerful House Tyrell, whose alliance is essential to the stability of the Lannister regime—particularly King Tommen's fiancée, Margaery, whom Cersei believes to be the subject of a prophecy about a "younger, more beautiful queen" who will take away all that Cersei holds dear.

Her reckless management raises the kingdom's debts to the Iron Bank of Braavos and the Faith of the Seven. When Cersei defaults the debt owed to the Iron Bank, the Bank's financial retaliation nearly cripples the economy of Westeros. To settle the crown's debts to the Faith, Cersei permits the restoration of its military order, the Faith Militant, ignoring the danger of a re-armed Faith. A scheme to falsely have the Faith put Margaery on trial for adultery backfires when the religious leadership imprisons Cersei herself on similar—and correct—charges.

=== Riverlands ===
Cersei dispatches Jaime to the Riverlands to put down the remnants of the late Robb Stark's rebellion. He unsuccessfully negotiates with Robb's great-uncle Brynden "the Blackfish" Tully to surrender the castle of Riverrun in exchange for his nephew Edmure's life, but he then convinces Edmure to surrender to save the lives of his men and his unborn child. Although the siege ends bloodlessly, Brynden escapes. Jaime then receives word that Cersei, who has been arrested by the Faith, wants him to defend her in a trial by combat, but Jaime burns her letter and abandons her to her fate.

Brienne's quest takes her across the Riverlands, where she witnesses the devastation of war. She acquires Podrick Payne, the former squire of Jaime's brother Tyrion, and Ser Hyle Hunt, a knight who had once mocked her ugliness, as traveling companions. She learns that Sansa's sister, Arya Stark, has actually survived and escaped King's Landing, and the feared warrior Sandor "the Hound" Clegane is reportedly dead, but someone wearing his helmet has massacred the town of Saltpans. She later kills the culprit, Rorge, but is gravely injured and mutilated by his companion, Biter. Eventually, she is captured by the Brotherhood Without Banners, which was once devoted to protecting the smallfolk of the Riverlands but is now commanded by the magically resurrected Catelyn Stark, Sansa's mother. The undead and vengeful Catelyn, who has taken the name Lady Stoneheart, sentences Brienne to death for consorting with the Lannisters but offers to spare her and her companions if she agrees to kill Jaime.

=== The Vale ===
In the remote castle of the Eyrie, Sansa poses as Littlefinger's illegitimate daughter Alayne Stone, befriending the young Lord Robert Arryn, managing the household, and receiving informal training in politics. During this time, Littlefinger appears to be carefully manipulating Robert's bannermen to secure his status as Lord Protector of the Vale. He eventually reveals that he plans to betroth Sansa to Harrold Hardyng, the next heir in line to the Vale; when the sickly Robert dies, Littlefinger intends to reveal Sansa's identity and claim her family stronghold of Winterfell in her name.

=== Iron Islands ===
On the Iron Islands, the late Balon Greyjoy's eldest surviving brother, Euron, returns from exile to claim the throne. To prevent this, his younger brother Aeron, a priest, calls a Kingsmoot to choose the successor. Although Euron's claim is challenged by his other younger brother Victarion and Balon's daughter, Asha, Euron is ultimately chosen as king for his vow to conquer Westeros and control Daenerys Targaryen's dragons with an enchanted horn he has. Under Euron's leadership, the Iron Fleet attacks the Reach, threatening House Tyrell's seat at Highgarden. Euron sends Victarion east to propose marriage to Daenerys on his behalf—to thus gain a claim to the Iron Throne—but Victarion secretly decides to woo her for himself instead.

=== Dorne ===
In the southern region of Dorne, Prince Doran Martell is confronted by three of the Sand Snakes—his brother Oberyn's bastard daughters—who want vengeance for the death of their father. Because they incite the commonfolk, Doran has his guard captain, Areo Hotah, arrest and imprison them in the palace.

A bold attempt by Doran's daughter Arianne to create a war of succession by crowning Tommen's sister, Myrcella Baratheon, as queen of Westeros is thwarted. In the confusion, one of Arianne's co-conspirators, Ser Gerold "Darkstar" Dayne, attempts to kill Myrcella and disfigures her face. Myrcella's guardian, Ser Arys Oakheart, is killed by Areo Hotah. This strains Dorne's new alliance with the Iron Throne. Doran later reveals to his daughter that he has a much grander plan to bring down the Lannisters, and her brother Quentyn has gone east to bring back "Fire and Blood" through an alliance with Daenerys.

=== Braavos ===
Arriving in the foreign city of Braavos, Arya Stark finds her way to the cult of face-changing assassins known as the Faceless Men. Accepted as a novice, Arya is taught to abandon her previous identity, but her true identity asserts itself in the form of wolf dreams.

Meanwhile, the Night's Watch lord commander Jon Snow has ordered Samwell Tarly to sail to the Citadel in Oldtown to train as a maester and warn the Seven Kingdoms about the return of the legendary hostile beings known as the Others. Sam is accompanied by the elderly Maester Aemon, the wildling girl Gilly, Gilly's newborn baby, and another Night's Watch member, Dareon. After the voyage begins, Sam realizes the child is actually the son of the wildling leader Mance Rayder, swapped with Gilly's real son. The party becomes temporarily stranded in Braavos when Aemon becomes sick, and Daeron absconds with their money. After learning that Daenerys possesses dragons, Aemon concludes that she is destined to fulfill a prophecy and that he needs to assist her. Shortly after the party finally leaves Braavos, Aemon dies at the age of 102. After Sam's party leaves, Arya chances upon Daeron and murders him for deserting the Night's Watch. As punishment for the unauthorized killing, the Faceless Men then feed her a potion that causes blindness.

=== Oldtown ===
At the end of the novel, Sam arrives at the Citadel and is introduced to Archmaester Marwyn. After learning about Aemon's death and the dragon prophecy about Daenerys, Marwyn leaves to find Daenerys. Before he leaves, he reveals to Sam that there is a maester conspiracy to suppress magic and that the Citadel orchestrated the downfall of the dragons centuries ago. He warns him not to talk about prophecy or dragons because the maesters will probably poison him. Sam also meets an acolyte who looks like and is named Pate.

== Characters ==
The story is narrated from the point of view of 12 characters, as well as a one-off prologue point of view. Unlike its predecessors, the fourth novel follows numerous minor characters, as well.

- Prologue: Pate, a novice of the Citadel in Oldtown
- Cersei Lannister, the Queen Regent
- Ser Jaime Lannister, Lord Commander of the Kingsguard
- Brienne, Maid of Tarth, a young warrior woman searching for Sansa and Arya Stark
- Sansa Stark, pretending to be Petyr Baelish's daughter "Alayne Stone" (her later chapters are titled as such)
- Arya Stark, later referred to as "Cat of the Canals", beginning her training at the House of Black and White in the free city of Braavos
- Samwell Tarly, a sworn brother of the Night's Watch
- In the Iron Islands:
  - The Prophet/the Drowned Man: Aeron "Damphair" Greyjoy, self-proclaimed servant of the Drowned God, and the youngest of the late King Balon's three surviving brothers
  - The Kraken's Daughter: Princess Asha Greyjoy, daughter of the late King Balon of the Iron Islands
  - The Iron Captain/the Reaver: Prince Victarion Greyjoy, Captain of the Iron Fleet, one of late King Balon's three surviving brothers
- In Dorne:
  - The Captain of Guards: Areo Hotah, Captain of the Guards to Prince Doran Martell of Dorne
  - The Soiled Knight: Ser Arys Oakheart of the Kingsguard
  - The Queenmaker/Princess in the Tower: Arianne Martell, daughter of Prince Doran and heir to Dorne

== Publication ==
Martin released the first four "Iron Islands" chapters of A Feast for Crows as a novella called Arms of the Kraken, published in the 305th edition of Dragon magazine in May 2003.

Another chapbook featuring three Daenerys chapters was published for BookExpo 2005, although following the geographical division of the book, these chapters were subsequently moved into the fifth volume in the series, A Dance with Dragons.

Martin originally planned for the fourth book to be called A Dance with Dragons, with the story picking up five years after the events of A Storm of Swords (primarily to advance the ages of the younger characters). However, during the writing process, it was discovered that this was leading to an overreliance on flashbacks to fill in the gap. After twelve months or so of working on the book, Martin decided to abandon much of what had previously been written and start again, this time picking up immediately after the end of A Storm of Swords. He announced this decision, along with the new title A Feast for Crows, at Worldcon in Philadelphia on September 1, 2001. He also announced that A Dance with Dragons would now be the fifth book in the sequence.

In May 2005, Martin announced that his manuscript for A Feast for Crows had hit 1527 completed pages but still remained unfinished, with "another hundred or so pages of roughs and incomplete chapters, as well as other chapters, sketched out but entirely unwritten." As the size of the manuscript for A Storm of Swords (2000), his previous novel, had been a problem for publishers around the world at 1521 pages, Martin and his publishers had decided to split the narrative planned for A Feast for Crows into two books. Rather than divide the text in half chronologically, Martin opted to instead split the material by character and location:

It was my feeling ... that we were better off telling all the story for half the characters, rather than half the story for all the characters. Cutting the novel in half would have produced two half-novels; our approach will produce two novels taking place simultaneously, but set hundreds or even thousands of miles apart, and involving different casts of characters (with some overlap).

Martin noted that A Feast for Crows would focus on "Westeros, King's Landing, the riverlands, Dorne, and the Iron Islands," and that the next novel, A Dance with Dragons, would cover "events in the east and north." Martin also added that the A Song of Ice and Fire series would now likely total seven novels. A Feast for Crows was published months later on October 17, 2005, over five years after the previous volume in the series, A Storm of Swords. The parallel novel A Dance with Dragons was released on July 12, 2011.

== Release details ==
- 2005, UK, Voyager ISBN 0-00-224743-7, Pub date October 17, 2005, hardback
- 2005, UK, Voyager ISBN 0-00-722463-X, Pub date ? ? 2005, hardback (presentation edition)
- 2005, US, Spectra Books ISBN 0-553-80150-3, Pub date November 8, 2005, hardback
- 2006, UK, Voyager ISBN 0-00-224742-9, Pub date April 25, 2006, paperback

== Reception ==
Though A Feast for Crows was the first novel in the sequence to debut at number one on The New York Times Best Seller list, it received more negative reviews in comparison with the previous novels in the series. Martin's decision to halve the plot in terms of character and location was highly controversial; many critics felt that this novel consisted of characters that people were less interested in. Publishers Weekly said, "Long-awaited doesn't begin to describe this fourth installment in bestseller Martin's staggeringly epic Song of Ice and Fire. [...]. This is not Act I Scene 4 but Act II Scene 1, laying groundwork more than advancing the plot, and it sorely misses its other half. The slim pickings here are tasty, but in no way satisfying." Salon.com's Andrew Leonard said in 2011, "I don't care how good a writer you are: If you subtract your three strongest characters from your tale, you severely undermine the basis for why readers fell under your spell in the first place. It didn't work. But there was also a sense in A Feast of Crows that Martin had lost his way. The characters whose stories he did tell wandered back and forth across a landscape devastated by war and oncoming winter, but didn't seem to be headed anywhere in particular." Remy Verhoeve of The Huffington Post noted in their 2011 A Dance with Dragons review that the fifth volume had to "repair some of the damage done by A Feast for Crows, which frankly felt as if it was written by a ghost writer at times." Both books had "the same structural problems", being "sprawling and incoherent", and in her opinion Feast has the less interesting characters. The Atlantic's Rachael Brown said in their A Dance With Dragons review that Feast was "bleak and plodding" and "sorely missed" Daenerys Targaryen, Tyrion Lannister, and Jon Snow.

== Awards and nominations ==
- Hugo Award – Best Novel (nominated) – (2006)
- Locus Award for Fantasy – Best Novel (nominated) – (2006)
- British Fantasy Award – Best Novel (nominated) – (2006)
- Quill Award – Best Novel (Science Fiction & Fantasy) (nominated) – (2006)
