= Tommen Baratheon =

- A Song of Ice and Fire character Game of Thrones character
- Dean-Charles Chapman as Tommen Baratheon
- First appearance: Literature: A Game of Thrones (1996); Television: "Winter Is Coming" (2011)
- Last appearance: Television: "The Winds of Winter" (2016)
- Created by: George R. R. Martin
- Adapted by: D.B. Weiss & David Benioff (Game of Thrones)
- Portrayed by: Callum Wharry (seasons 1–2); Dean-Charles Chapman (seasons 4–6)

In-universe information
- Alias: The Boy King
- Gender: Male
- Titles: Lord of the Seven Kingdoms; Protector of the Realm; Novels: King of the Andals, the Rhoynar and the First Men; Television: King of the Andals and the First Men
- Occupation: King
- Family: House Lannister; House Baratheon (false)
- Spouse: Margaery Tyrell
- Relatives: Cersei Lannister (mother); Jaime Lannister (biological father); Robert Baratheon (legal father); Joffrey Baratheon (brother); Myrcella Baratheon (sister); Tywin Lannister (grandfather); Joanna Lannister (grandmother); Tyrion Lannister (uncle); Kevan Lannister (granduncle); Mya Stone (legal half-sister); Bella (legal half-sister); Gendry (legal half-brother); Edric Storm (legal half-brother); Barra (legal half-sister); Other legal half-siblings; Steffon Baratheon (legal grandfather); Cassana Estermont (legal grandmother); Stannis Baratheon (legal uncle); Renly Baratheon (legal uncle); Shireen Baratheon (legal cousin)

Tommen Baratheon is a fictional character in the A Song of Ice and Fire series of fantasy novels by American author George R. R. Martin, and its television adaptation Game of Thrones. Introduced in 1996's A Game of Thrones, Tommen Baratheon is the youngest son of Robert Baratheon and Cersei Lannister from the kingdom of Westeros. He subsequently appeared in Martin's A Clash of Kings (1998), A Storm of Swords (2000), A Feast for Crows (2005) and A Dance with Dragons (2011). After the unexpected death of his brother Joffrey Baratheon, he is crowned king of the Seven Kingdoms, although he soon falls under the warring influences of his mother Cersei and wife Margaery.

In the HBO television adaptation, Tommen Baratheon is portrayed by Callum Wharry from seasons one to two and by Dean-Charles Chapman from seasons four through six.

== Character description ==
Prince Tommen Baratheon is the younger brother of Joffrey and Princess Myrcella and is second in line for the throne. Tommen is Queen Cersei Lannister's youngest child and, like his siblings, he is also the son of Cersei's twin brother Jaime Lannister, but he is unaware of this, as he believes Robert Baratheon to be his father. Tommen is described as handsome and sweet-natured but weak-willed. Many characters in the narrative believe he would make a better, and more pliant, king than his brother Joffrey. He loves his kittens, and keeps several in both the novels and the television show. Tommen is seven years old at the beginning of A Game of Thrones (1996).

Tommen Baratheon is not a point of view character in the novels, so his actions are witnessed and interpreted through the eyes of other people, such as his mother Cersei Lannister, his uncle Tyrion Lannister, and Sansa Stark. Tommen is mostly a background character in the novels.

== Storylines ==
After King Joffrey's death in A Storm of Swords, Tommen is crowned and marries Joffrey's young widow, Margaery Tyrell. Tommen is a submissive child and, as a result, does everything that is asked of him. Thus, Cersei uses him to rule as she likes, though Margaery also begins to manipulate him into resisting his mother.

== TV adaptation ==
Callum Wharry as Tommen in the second season.

Young actor Callum Wharry portrayed Tommen in the first and second season; the character was then recast with Dean-Charles Chapman from the fourth season until his death in the sixth season.

=== Season 2 ===
When Myrcella was shipped off to Dorne as part of a marriage alliance with the Lannisters, Tommen wept when his sister left, for which Joffrey chastised him. During the battle of the Blackwater, Cersei was prepared to give him nightshade drops for a quick painless death rather than brutality, until Tywin announced that they won the battle.

=== Season 4 ===
Tommen is present at Joffrey and Margaery's wedding. He also attended Joffrey's funeral, after which Tywin uses a rhetorical dialectic to counsel Tommen on wisdom, the duties of a king and his marriage, ignoring Cersei's angry glares. Margaery visits Tommen (and his pet cat, Ser Pounce) one night. Her discussion of Joffrey's cruelties to the two of them helps him and Margaery to bond. Tommen agrees that he'd like Margaery to secretly visit him again. The older and much less naive Margaery departs, kissing his forehead. A ceremony is held in the Red Keep where the high septon officially crowns Tommen as king. At Tyrion's trial Tommen recuses himself from the trial, possibly on Tywin's advice.

=== Season 5 ===
During the wake of his deceased grandfather, Tommen is approached by Margaery, who shares a few close words with him and holds his hand briefly. All of this is observed by Cersei from afar. Tommen and Margaery later marry and consummate that same night, whereupon Margaery begins to manipulate Tommen to send Cersei back to Casterly Rock. When he does, Cersei immediately begins scheming to get rid of the Tyrells through the High Sparrow and Faith Militant by arranging them to arrest Loras Tyrell for his homosexuality and Margaery for her knowledge of this. However, Cersei's plan backfires and she is also arrested. Tommen falls into a depression, refusing to eat.

=== Season 6 ===
Tommen confines Cersei to the Red Keep after her release, in order to protect her from the Faith Militant. However, Tommen is eventually manipulated by the High Sparrow to forge an alliance with the Faith. He also abolishes trial by combat, replacing it with trial by seven septons. Rather than attend her trial, Cersei detonates a cache of wildfire beneath the Sept of Baelor, killing the High Sparrow and Margaery in the explosion. Tommen is barred in his quarters by Ser Gregor Clegane and witnesses the explosion from his window. After a servant informs him of Margaery's death, he commits suicide by jumping from the Red Keep. Cersei orders him cremated and claims his throne as monarch of the Seven Kingdoms.

=== Family tree of House Lannister ===
Descendants of Tytos Lannister

Tytos	Jeyne; Marbrand
Joanna	Tywin	Emmon; Frey	Genna	Kevan	Dorna; Swyft	Tygett	Darlessa; Marbrand	Gerion	Briony
Robert; Baratheon	Cersei	Jaime	Tysha (Note: Tyrion's first wife was a peasant girl named Tysha. The marriage was later annulled by Lord Tywin's order.)	Tyrion	Sansa; Stark	Amerei; Frey	Lancel	Martyn	Willem	Janei	Tyrek	Ermesande; Hayford	Joy; Hill
Joffrey; Baratheon (Note: Though officially Robert's children, Joffrey, Myrcella and Tommen are the products of an incestuous affair between Cersei and Jaime.)	Myrcella; Baratheon	Margaery; Tyrell	Tommen; Baratheon	Tion; Frey	"Red" Walder; Frey	Jeyne; Darry	Cleos; Frey	Lyonel; Frey	Melesa Crakehall
Tywin; Frey	Willem; Frey

References and notes:
