= Renly Baratheon =

- A Song of Ice and Fire character Game of Thrones character
- Gethin Anthony as Renly Baratheon
- First appearance: Literature: A Game of Thrones (1996); Television: "Lord Snow" (2011)
- Last appearance: Literature: A Clash of Kings (1998); Television: "The Ghost of Harrenhal" (2012)
- Created by: George R. R. Martin
- Adapted by: David Benioff; D.B. Weiss (Game of Thrones)
- Portrayed by: Gethin Anthony

In-universe information
- Aliases: The King in Highgarden; The King in the South
- Gender: Male
- Titles: Lord Paramount of the Stormlands; Lord of Storm's End; Master of Laws; Lord of the Seven Kingdoms (claimant)
- Occupation: King; Master of Laws
- Family: House Baratheon
- Spouse: Margaery Tyrell
- Significant other: Loras Tyrell
- Relatives: Steffon Baratheon (father); Cassana Estermont (mother); Robert Baratheon (brother); Stannis Baratheon (brother); Shireen Baratheon (niece); Mya Stone (niece); Bella (niece); Gendry (nephew); Edric Storm (nephew); Barra (niece); Other nephews and nieces; Lord Estermont (grandfather); Joffrey Baratheon (legal nephew); Myrcella Baratheon (legal niece); Tommen Baratheon (legal nephew)

Renly Baratheon is a fictional character in the A Song of Ice and Fire series of fantasy novels by American author George R. R. Martin and its television adaptation, Game of Thrones.

Introduced in 1996's A Game of Thrones, Renly is the youngest of the three sons of Lord Steffon Baratheon and Cassana Estermont, with his brothers Robert and Stannis Baratheon preceding him. He is the lord of Storm's End and lord paramount of the Stormlands. He served as master of laws in his eldest brother's small council before crowning himself king in the wake of Robert's death with the support of the Reach and the Stormlands, an act that helps kick off the War of Five Kings. This brings him into conflict with his surviving older brother, Stannis, whose claim is greater.

Renly's homosexual relationship with Loras Tyrell is alluded to in the books and is made clearly evident in the television show. Both men are among Martin's most prominent LGBTQ characters, though Renly and Loras's adapted relationship and the show's portrayal of the latter has received mixed criticism.

Renly Baratheon is portrayed by Gethin Anthony in the HBO television adaptation.

== Character description ==
Renly Baratheon is the younger brother of King Robert and King Stannis. He is a handsome and charismatic man who wins friends easily, which makes him popular with the smallfolk. He is thought to look extremely similar to his older brother Robert, albeit smaller and slimmer, inheriting the Baratheon height and long black hair. Although he is well-liked and charismatic, many powerful lords at court secretly consider him to be vain and frivolous. He is described as disdainful of reading, but he enjoys hunting and jousting. Renly is also a closeted gay man in a relationship with Loras Tyrell.

Renly is not a point of view character in the novels, so his actions are witnessed and interpreted through the eyes of other people, such as Ned and Catelyn Stark. He is also often mentioned and remembered by Brienne of Tarth, who had fallen in love with him at a young age. Renly is mostly a background character in the novels.

== Storylines ==
Renly Baratheon is the youngest of the Baratheon brothers and the lord of Storm's End. He is described as handsome and charismatic, winning friends easily. Renly serves on Robert's council as master of laws. After Robert dies, Renly declares himself King of the Seven Kingdoms in A Clash of Kings; wins the support of the Baratheon bannermen, as he is their lord paramount; and seals an alliance with House Tyrell by marrying Margaery Tyrell. Before he can march on the King's Landing, though, he hears Stannis is besieging Storm's End. Renly marches there, intending to kill his brother in battle, and turning down an offer to become Stannis's heir. Before the battle, he is assassinated by a shadow conjured by Melisandre, though it is unclear if Stannis is aware of this or not.

== TV adaptation ==
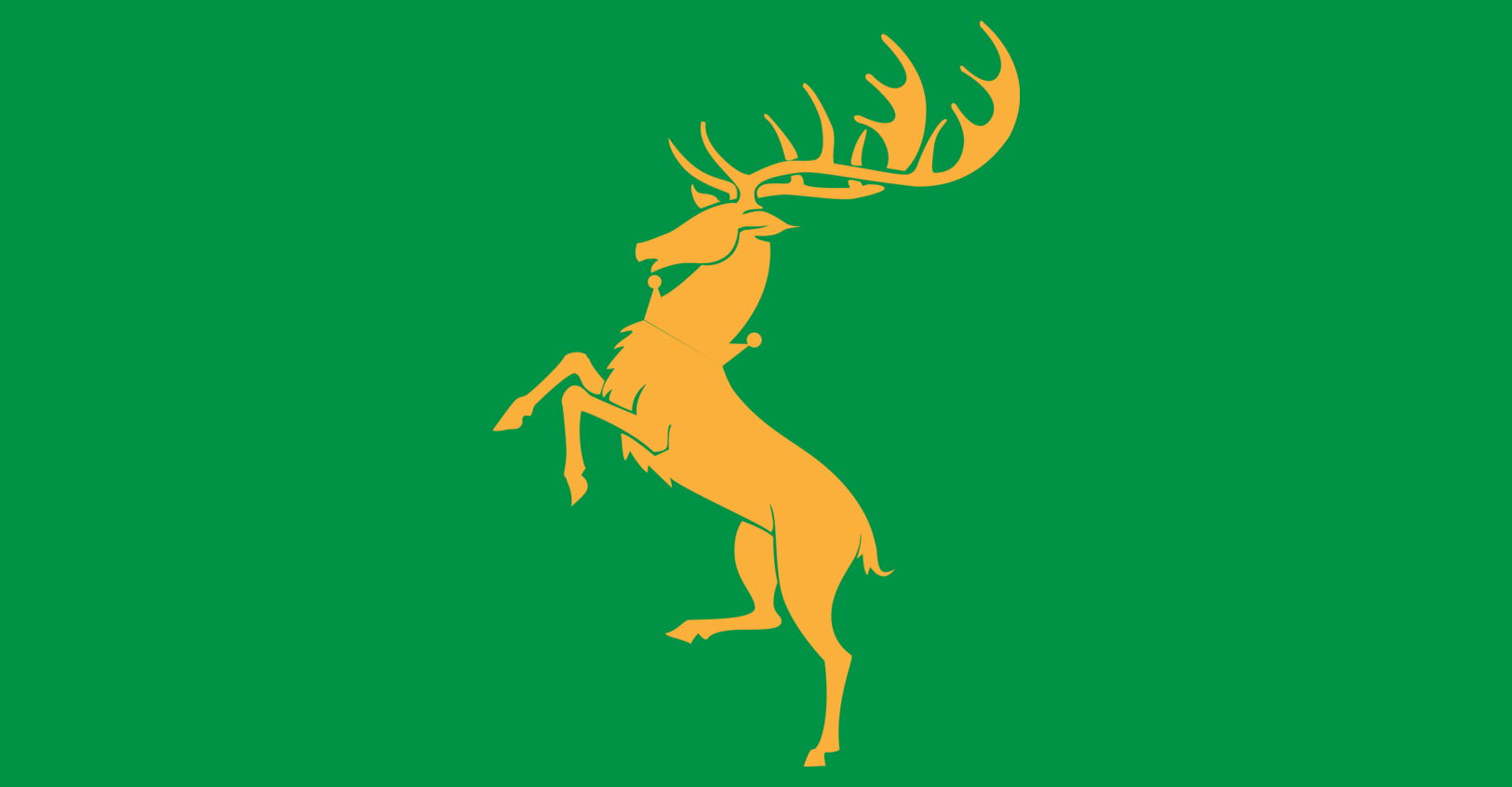
Banner of arms of King Renly Baratheon in Game of Thrones

Renly Baratheon is played by the British actor Gethin Anthony in the television adaptation of the series of books.

Gethin Anthony said of his character in 2012: "The reason why I like playing him is I think he's a fantastic man who believes in Westeros being a cultured and enlightened place. His major advantage, and why he gets on well in the world, is that he gets on well with people."

=== Season 1 ===
Renly Baratheon, the lord of Storm's End, is the youngest brother of King Robert and Master of Laws in the king's small council. He is popular with the people because he is handsome, jovial, and throws extravagant balls and masquerades. He is not fond of fighting or bloodshed, and would rather make friends than kill enemies. He is secretly the lover of Ser Loras Tyrell, the Knight of the Flowers, who convinces him that those qualities make him better ruling material than either of his older brothers. While Robert lies dying, Renly attempts to convince Ned of this, and that the two of them should depose Joffrey and rule the realm themselves. However, Ned refuses, so Renly, Loras, and their followers flee south. Once Joffrey becomes king and has Ned executed, Renly challenges his alleged nephew's claim to the throne.

=== Season 2 ===
Renly declares himself King of the Seven Kingdoms during season 2 and wins the support of the Baratheon bannermen and the support of other houses, despite Stannis' better claim. He also seals an alliance with the powerful House Tyrell and its bannermen (including Randyll Tarly, father of Samwell Tarly) by marrying Margaery Tyrell. He leads his massive army slowly through southern Westeros, biding his time. Catelyn Stark tries to convince Renly and Stannis to put aside their differences and unite against the Lannisters but it fails as both brothers refuse to give up their claim for the throne. On the night before a battle between his and Stannis' forces, Renly agrees to allow Robb Stark to keep the title "King in the North" and rule the North and Riverlands, but on the condition that he swear fealty to Renly as King on the Iron Throne. Before Catelyn can offer a real negotiation, Renly is assassinated by Melisandre, who gives birth to a shadow demon and sends it to kill Renly in order to remove him from Stannis' path. Stannis is initially unaware of the exact nature of Melisandre's crime, and is later visibly shocked and saddened of the role he played in his brother's death, which he visibly regrets.

=== Season 5 ===
Renly is later avenged in the Season 5 finale when Brienne of Tarth executes his brother Stannis after the battle outside Winterfell against the Boltons, spitefully telling Stannis that Renly was the rightful King.

=== Family tree of House Baratheon ===
Family tree of House Baratheon

Ormund	Rhaelle; Targaryen
Steffon	Cassana; Estermont
Delena; Florent	Robert; 283–298	Cersei; Lannister	Jaime; Lannister	Stannis	Selyse; Florent	Renly	Margaery; Tyrell (Note: Margaery Tyrell first married Renly, then Joffrey, and then Tommen.)
Edric; Storm	Gendry	Bella	Myrcella (Note: Joffrey, Myrcella and Tommen, although recognized by Robert, are secretly the illegitimate children of Jaime Lannister.)	Shireen
Mya; Stone	Barra	11 others	Joffrey; 298–300	Margaery; Tyrell	Tommen; 300–
