= Gendry =

- A Song of Ice and Fire character Game of Thrones character
- Joe Dempsie as Gendry
- First appearance: Literature: A Game of Thrones (1996); Television: "Cripples, Bastards, and Broken Things" (2011)
- Last appearance: Television: "The Iron Throne" (2019)
- Created by: George R. R. Martin
- Adapted by: D.B. Weiss & David Benioff (Game of Thrones)
- Portrayed by: Joe Dempsie

In-universe information
- Aliases: The Bull; Ser Gendry of the Hollow Hill; Television: Clovis; Gendry Baratheon (legitimized by Queen Daenerys Targaryen)
- Gender: Male
- Titles: Television: Lord of Storm's End; Lord Paramount of the Stormlands; Warden of the South
- Family: House Baratheon
- Significant others: Television: Arya Stark
- Relatives: Robert Baratheon (father); Mya Stone (half-sister); Bella (half-sister); Edric Storm (half-brother); Barra (half-sister); Other half-siblings; Steffon Baratheon (grandfather); Cassana Estermont (grandmother); Stannis Baratheon (uncle); Renly Baratheon (uncle); Shireen Baratheon (cousin); Joffrey Baratheon (legal half-brother); Myrcella Baratheon (legal half-sister); Tommen Baratheon (legal half-brother)

Gendry is a fictional character in the A Song of Ice and Fire series of epic fantasy novels by American author George R. R. Martin and its HBO television adaptation, Game of Thrones, in which the character is portrayed by English actor Joe Dempsie.

First appearing in A Game of Thrones (1996), Gendry is a blacksmith apprentice in King's Landing and an unacknowledged bastard of King Robert Baratheon. He subsequently appeared in A Clash of Kings (1998), A Storm of Swords (2000), and A Feast for Crows (2005). After Queen Cersei Lannister orders the execution of all of the deceased Robert's bastards, Gendry is forced to flee King's Landing alongside Arya Stark under the protection of Yoren, a recruiter for the Night's Watch. He later joins the outlaw group Brotherhood Without Banners, is knighted by its leader, Beric Dondarrion, and becomes a follower of the fire deity R'hllor.

== Character description ==
Gendry was born in the slums of King's Landing after Robert Baratheon overthrew House Targaryen. He is one of the sixteen bastard children (twenty in the HBO television series) fathered by the king. Through Robert, he is a biological (though illegitimate) nephew to both Stannis and Renly Baratheon and a first cousin to Stannis's daughter, Princess Shireen Baratheon, the heiress of House Baratheon on Dragonstone and Stannis's claim to the Iron Throne. Through Robert's grandmother, Princess Rhaelle Targaryen, Aegon V Targaryen's youngest daughter, Gendry is actually also a second cousin (once removed) to Rhaegar, Viserys III, and Daenerys Targaryen.

Gendry is 14 years old when introduced in the first book. He is portrayed as tall and very muscled, with blue eyes and thick black hair, very similar to his biological father, Robert, in youth, and Eddard Stark recognizes him as Robert's son immediately upon meeting the boy. Gendry also looks hauntingly like a younger version of Renly Baratheon (whom Sansa Stark once described as "the handsomest man [she] had ever set eyes upon"), though with a squarer jaw, bushier brows, and tangled hair; he resembles his biological uncle enough that, for a moment, Brienne of Tarth almost mistook him for the deceased Renly. Gendry is intelligent despite being born into poverty, but he is also stubborn, sullen, suspicious, easily confused, and shy around women. Arya Stark commented that he looks "pained" when he tries to think.

Despite being one of the four surviving biological children of King Robert—along with Mya Stone, Edric Storm, and Bella of Stoney Sept—by the end of the second book, Gendry is unaware of his paternity. However, he did see Robert from afar multiple times and was once nearly trampled by a drunken Robert's horse while playing near the city gate. His mother was reported to have been an alehouse worker who died when Gendry was still a young boy, and all he remembers of her was that she had blonde hair. Later on, Tobho Mott, a master armourer from Qohor working in King's Landing, was offered double the customary fee by a "lord" with a concealed identity to take Gendry in as a metalsmith apprentice, but accepted him for free after being impressed by the boy's physique. Gendry turns out to be a talented blacksmith and likes to spend time polishing a bull-head helmet that he proudly made for himself, which earned him the nickname "Bull" from fellow orphan boy Lommy Greenhands.

== Storylines ==
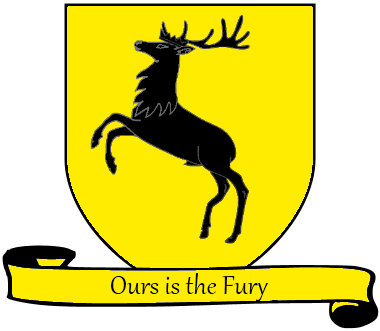
Coat of arms of House Baratheon

Gendry is not a point-of-view character in the novels, and his actions are witnessed and interpreted primarily through the eyes of Arya Stark, with further descriptions from Eddard "Ned" Stark and Brienne of Tarth. He has by far the most elaborated story arc out of King Robert Baratheon's children.

=== A Game of Thrones ===
In his investigation into the death of Jon Arryn, Eddard "Ned" Stark meets several people who had met with Arryn shortly before his death. One of them is Gendry, who was sought by both Arryn and Stannis Baratheon. Ned immediately recognizes Gendry as a bastard child of King Robert Baratheon and tells Tobho Mott that if Gendry ever shows interest in military service, he is to be sent directly to Ned. Gendry has shown promise as a blacksmith and has made a helmet shaped like a bull's head. Ned compliments the helmet, offering to purchase it, but Gendry refuses, to the embarrassment of his master.

=== A Clash of Kings ===
After King Robert's death and Ned's political fall and eventual public execution, Varys makes arrangements for the Night's Watch recruiter Yoren to take Gendry to the Wall in order to protect him from Queen Cersei Lannister's purge. Gendry travels north with Yoren and thirty other recruits, including Lommy Greenhands, Hot Pie, and a disguised Arya Stark. Not far from King's Landing, they are stopped by several Gold Cloaks from the City Watch, who demand that Yoren give up Gendry, as he is wanted by Queen Cersei. Yoren refuses and threatens the Gold Cloaks with his recruits.

Later, near an abandoned holdfast by the God's Eye lake, the recruits are attacked by Lannister soldiers led by Ser Amory Lorch. Yoren is killed in the fight, and Gendry, along with Arya, Lommy, and Hot Pie, escape the burning holdfast through a secret tunnel. Whilst on a reconnaissance run with Arya, Gendry confronts her about her true gender and identity. He eventually has the truth out of her and is subsequently embarrassed by how crass he had spoken to her when she was in fact a highborn lady. Gendry is later captured by Ser Gregor Clegane's soldiers, but is spared from death since his metalworking skill is useful as a slave laborer. After Lannister man-at-arms Rafford kills the injured Lommy, they are taken to Harrenhal, where Gendry works as a smith. When Arya decides to escape from Harrenhal, however, she persuades Gendry and Hot Pie to join her.

=== A Storm of Swords ===
While wandering around the Riverlands looking for the direction of Riverrun, Arya, Gendry and Hot Pie are captured by the Brotherhood Without Banners, led by a resurrected Beric Dondarrion. At the Peach brothel in Stoney Sept, Gendry declines a seductive advance by Bella (who is, unbeknownst to him, his half-sister), but later argues with Arya out of jealousy because she was talking to Beric's squire, Edric Dayne, who claims to be Jon Snow's milk brother. Gendry is later impressed with Thoros of Myr's description of the ideals of the Brotherhood and decides to join them. He is knighted by Beric, thus becoming Ser Gendry, Knight of the Hollow Hill.

=== A Feast for Crows ===
While questing to find Sansa Stark, Brienne of Tarth encounters Gendry working as a smith at the Inn at the Crossroads along with a group of orphans, and she is struck by his resemblance to the late Renly Baratheon. At the inn, Brienne encounters and duels with Rorge, killing him, only to be savaged by Biter; Gendry saves Brienne's life by driving a spear through Biter's neck. He then takes Brienne and her squire, Podrick Payne, to the Brotherhood's new leader, the resurrected Catelyn Stark, now known as Lady Stoneheart.

=== Family tree of House Baratheon ===
Family tree of House Baratheon

Ormund	Rhaelle; Targaryen
Steffon	Cassana; Estermont
Delena; Florent	Robert; 283–298	Cersei; Lannister	Jaime; Lannister	Stannis	Selyse; Florent	Renly	Margaery; Tyrell (Note: Margaery Tyrell first married Renly, then Joffrey, and then Tommen.)
Edric; Storm	Gendry	Bella	Myrcella (Note: Joffrey, Myrcella and Tommen, although recognized by Robert, are secretly the illegitimate children of Jaime Lannister.)	Shireen
Mya; Stone	Barra	11 others	Joffrey; 298–300	Margaery; Tyrell	Tommen; 300–

== TV adaptation ==
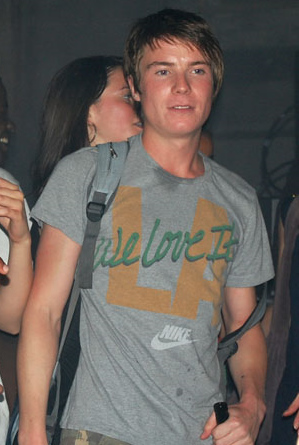
Joe Dempsie plays the role of Gendry in the television series Game of Thrones.

Joe Dempsie plays Gendry in the television adaptation of the book series. Explaining how he was cast for the role:

When I was cast as Gendry, I didn't have any of the physical attributes the part required. I was astounded that I got the role, to be honest. But David and Dan said, "We need to dye his hair black ... and it'd be great [if] you hit the gym before we start filming." So I was told to get in shape.

Dempsie has received positive reviews for his performance as Gendry in the television series. He and the rest of the cast were nominated for Screen Actors Guild Awards for Outstanding Performance by an Ensemble in a Drama Series in 2014.

=== Season 1 ===
Eddard "Ned" Stark tells the smith to send Gendry to him if he ever shows interest in wielding a sword. Gendry shows promise as a smith and makes a helmet in the shape of a bull's head; Eddard compliments the helmet, offering to purchase it. Gendry refuses, to the shame of the master smith. After Ned's arrest and eventual execution, arrangements are made for Yoren of the Night's Watch to take Gendry to the Wall with him.

=== Season 2 ===
Gendry travels North with Yoren and other Night's Watch recruits, including Arya Stark (disguised as an orphan boy named 'Arry'), Lommy Greenhands, Hot Pie, and Jaqen H'ghar. During their journey, the Goldcloaks of the City Watch stop them. They demand that Yoren hand Gendry over to them because King Joffrey has ordered that all of his father Robert's bastards be killed. Yoren turns the Goldcloaks away. Later, Gendry forces Arya to reveal her true identity and is surprised to learn she is Ned Stark's daughter. After the Goldcloaks get help from Ser Amory Lorch and his men, they ambush the travelling party. In the chaos, Yoren is killed. Gendry's life is saved by Arya, who convinces the Goldcloaks that Lommy, who was killed during the attack, was Gendry. Gendry and the rest of the recruits are escorted to Harrenhal, the ruined castle-turned-prison. Ser Gregor Clegane oversees order here and arbitrarily has many of the prisoners tortured and killed. Gendry is nearly tortured and killed but is saved by the arrival of Lord Tywin Lannister, who chides Clegane's men for their reckless treatment of the prisoners. With Jaqen H'ghar's help, Arya, Gendry, and Hot Pie are able to escape Harrenhal.

=== Season 3 ===
As they head towards the Riverlands, the group encounters the Brotherhood Without Banners, a group of outlaws who defend the weak. Inspired, Gendry decides to join the Brotherhood but is betrayed by them when they sell him to Lady Melisandre, as ordered by the Lord of Light, the fire deity R'hllor. Melisandre later reveals to Gendry that the late King Robert was his father, and that she is bringing him to meet his uncle Stannis at Dragonstone. in truth, Melisandre and Stannis plan to use Gendry's blood in a magic ritual to create a death curse on the usurpers to his throne: King Joffrey Baratheon; the King in the North, Robb Stark; and King of the Iron Islands Balon Greyjoy. Before they can sacrifice Gendry, Davos Seaworth helps him escape to King's Landing in a rowboat. Unable to swim or row competently, Gendry is nevertheless convinced that the Red Woman (i.e., Melisandre) has a surer death in store for him and returns to Westeros's capital by sea.

=== Season 7 ===
In the years after his escape from Dragonstone, a series of events results in the deaths of the rest of House Baratheon, leaving Gendry as the only person with Baratheon heritage. Gendry returns to work as a blacksmith in King's Landing, hiding in plain sight from the Lannister soldiers and Goldcloaks. Although he reasons that the Lannisters will not think to look for him in the city, he grates at having to manufacture weapons for their army. Gendry is greeted by Davos, who has briefly returned to the capital to smuggle Tyrion to a secret meeting with Jaime and takes the opportunity to find Gendry. He wants Gendry's assistance in the coming war against the White Walkers. Gendry eagerly agrees. After meeting King in the North, Jon Snow, and bonding over their statuses as bastard sons of Robert Baratheon and (allegedly) Ned Stark, respectively, they head north to Eastwatch-by-the-Sea. Gendry, alongside Jon, Tormund Giantsbane, Sandor Clegane, Beric Dondarrion, Thoros of Myr, and Jorah Mormont, travel beyond the Wall to retrieve a wight to present as evidence to Cersei Lannister of the impending White Walker invasion. Gendry still resents Beric and Thoros for selling him. The group manages to capture a lone wight, but Jon realizes that the rest of the wights are approaching and orders Gendry to run back to Eastwatch to send a raven to Daenerys Targaryen requesting her assistance. After running through the night, Gendry collapses from exhaustion outside Eastwatch, but is rescued by Davos and a group of wildlings, managing to tell them of Jon's warning.

=== Season 8 ===
Gendry joins Daenerys's army as they camp at Winterfell in anticipation of the White Walkers' attack. Gendry is tasked with smithing weapons from dragonglass, which can kill the wights. Reunited with Arya, she asks him to create a dual-bladed dragonglass staff. On the eve of the attack, Gendry gives her the weapon and relates his Baratheon heritage to her. Arya inquires about his past romantic liaisons, then expresses her desire to lose her virginity, should they die tomorrow, and they make love. Gendry survives the Long Night and is legitimised as a Baratheon by Daenerys, and given lordship of Storm's End. Gendry professes his love to Arya and proposes, but Arya declines, not wanting the life of a lady.

Daenerys wrests control of King's Landing from Cersei Lannister but burns the populace of the city after they surrender to her. Jon tries but fails to dissuade Daenerys from further destruction and ultimately assassinates her. With the deaths of Cersei and Daenerys, Westeros is left without a ruler. Gendry travels to King's Landing along with Westeros's other nobility to decide the future of the Seven Kingdoms. Tyrion Lannister proposes that all future kings be elected by the lords and ladies of Westeros instead of the crown being handed down from father to son, and he nominates Bran Stark to be crowned king. Gendry, as the new lord of Storm's End, approves, along with the other lords, unanimously.

== Sources ==
- Martin, George R. R. (September 1996). A Game of Thrones. A Song of Ice and Fire (US hardcover ed.). Bantam Spectra. ISBN 978-0-553-10354-0.
