= Stannis Baratheon =

Character in A Song of Ice and Fire and Game of Thrones

- A Song of Ice and Fire character Game of Thrones character
- Stephen Dillane as Stannis Baratheon
- First appearance: Literature: A Clash of Kings (1998); Television: "The North Remembers" (2012)
- Last appearance: Television: "Mother's Mercy" (2015)
- Created by: George R. R. Martin
- Based on: Tiberius Caesar by: Martin Lisemore; Joan Sullivan; Herbert Wise; Jack Pulman
- Adapted by: D.B. Weiss & David Benioff (Game of Thrones)
- Portrayed by: Stephen Dillane

In-universe information
- Aliases: The King in the Narrow Sea; The King of the Painted Table; The King of Dragonstone; The King at the Wall; The dark lord; Azor Ahai; The prince that was promised
- Gender: Male
- Titles: Lord of Dragonstone; Lord Paramount of the Stormlands; Master of Ships (former); Lord of Storm's End; King of the Andals, the Rhoynar, and the First Men (claimant); King of Westeros (claimant); Lord of the Seven Kingdoms (claimant); Protector of the Realm (claimant); Ser; Commander of the Nightfort
- Occupation: King, military and political commander
- Family: House Baratheon
- Spouse: Selyse Florent
- Children: Shireen Baratheon; Television: Three stillborn sons: Petyr, Tommard, and Edric Baratheon
- Relatives: Steffon Baratheon (father); Cassana Estermont (mother); Robert Baratheon (brother); Renly Baratheon (brother); Mya Stone (niece); Bella (niece); Gendry (nephew); Edric Storm (nephew); Barra (niece); Other nephews and nieces; Lord Estermont (grandfather); Joffrey Baratheon (legal nephew); Myrcella Baratheon (legal niece); Tommen Baratheon (legal nephew)

Stannis Baratheon is a fictional character in the A Song of Ice and Fire series of epic fantasy novels by American author George R. R. Martin, and its television adaptation Game of Thrones. He is the younger brother of Robert Baratheon, king of the Seven Kingdoms of Westeros; and second-older brother to Renly Baratheon, lord of Storm's End. He is the lord of Dragonstone and served as Robert's master of ships, and often struggles under the shadows of his two more overtly charismatic brothers, particularly Robert. He is a key player in the massive civil war known as the War of the Five Kings, which is the core storyline of the first three novels.

First mentioned in 1996's A Game of Thrones, Stannis formally appeared as a character in A Clash of Kings (1998), A Storm of Swords (2000) and A Dance with Dragons (2011). He is not a point-of-view character in the novels, and his plot is mainly narrated through the chapters of Davos Seaworth and later Jon Snow. In December 2011, Martin posted a sample chapter told from Theon Greyjoy's viewpoint from the yet-unfinished sixth book The Winds of Winter, which confirmed Stannis' presence in the future books.

Stannis is a very capable military commander and strategist in both land and naval warfares, although his stubborn personality as an unforgiving proponent of justice has made him a very unpopular bureaucrat in the royal court. After King Robert's untimely death, he becomes a rival claimant to the Iron Throne against his nephew Joffrey, whom he has discovered (together with the late Jon Arryn) to be a bastard born of incest between Queen Cersei and her twin brother Jaime. Stannis' struggles claiming the Iron Throne are frequently impeded by his lack of manpower and resources, further compounded by his unpopularity among other noble houses, thus relying heavily on the few noble houses that still swear loyalty to Dragonstone and knights allied with the birth family of his wife Selyse. He is counselled by the newly recruited foreign priestess Melisandre and his lowborn right-hand man, ex-smuggler Davos Seaworth, whom Stannis secretly trusts the most and later promotes to Hand of the King.

Stannis is portrayed by veteran English actor Stephen Dillane in the HBO television adaptation of the series, who has received significant critical praise for his performance. Stannis is a divisive character among fans of the books and television show alike, enjoying both great popularity for his dedication to justice and dark horse status, as well as opposition for his unrelenting attitude towards the Iron Throne. He has earned particular attention for the differences in his characterization between the novels and show, particularly during season five.

== Character description ==
Stannis Baratheon is the second son of Lord Steffon Baratheon and Lady Cassana Estermont, along with brothers Robert and Renly. He is portrayed as a brooding and humorless man with a harsh but fair sense of duty and justice whose dour demeanor is often off-putting in comparison to his two more charismatic brothers. He is renowned as a skilled and prescient military commander. Although he is initially said to be extremely stubborn and inflexible, in later books he has shown some ability to use diplomacy and deception to achieve his goals.

=== Background ===
Stannis was born in 264 AC as the second of the three sons of Steffon Baratheon, the lord paramount of the Stormlands, and Lady Cassana Estermont. A very introverted person, Stannis was constantly overshadowed by his much more masculine and charismatic older brother Robert, and was also outshone socially by the flamboyantly charming younger brother Renly. Donal Noye, a smith of the Night's Watch who used to serve as the house armorer at Storm's End, once describes the three Baratheon brothers as that "Robert was the true steel. Stannis is pure iron, black and hard and strong, yes, but brittle, the way iron gets. He'll break before he bends. And Renly, that one, he's copper, bright and shiny, pretty to look at but not worth all that much at the end of the day."

In his youth, Stannis once found an injured goshawk which he nursed back to health and named Proudwing, but the bird never flew higher than the treetops thereafter and was mocked as "Weakwing" by Robert. Stannis was eventually convinced by his great-uncle Harbert to abandon Proudwing and get another hawking bird, a childhood experience that helped shaping his highly secular and pragmatic attitude towards religious faith later in his life.

When Stannis was 14, his lord father Steffon was sent to Volantis by King Aerys II Targaryen to find a bride "of noble birth from an old Valyrian bloodline" for Crown Prince Rhaegar. Steffon, traveling with his wife Cassana, failed to find a suitable bride for Rhaegar, but had found a very talented fool nicknamed "Patchface", whom they thought would entertain and finally teach Stannis to enjoy laughter. However, during their return journey, Steffon and Cassana's ship Windproud was caught in a severe storm in the Shipbreaker Bay and sank within direct view of Storm's End, the only survivor being the fool Patchface, who became insanely eccentric afterwards. Stannis, who was standing with Robert behind the castle's parapets anticipating his parents' return, witnessed his parents' death and was deeply traumatized, subsequently losing all faith and respect in the Seven Gods.

When Robert rebelled against King Aerys in 282 AC, a still-teenaged Stannis was put in charge of holding Storm's End in Robert's absence. Stannis successfully commanded the castle's defense from sieging by loyalist Reach forces under Mace Tyrell and Paxter Redwyne for the best part of the year, although his garrison only survived starvation thanks to the smuggler Davos Seaworth, who evaded the sea blockade by the Redwyne fleet to bring the Baratheon soldiers a shipful of onions and salted fish. When Eddard Stark finally arrived to lift the siege, Stannis knighted Davos as a reward for his aid, but also insists that Davos have four fingertips from his left hand cut off as punishment for his years of illegal smuggling; Davos agreed to accept the punishment on the condition that Stannis personally performs the amputation. Stannis was subsequently tasked with building a new royal fleet to assault and capture Dragonstone, but arrived on the island to find that Aerys' surviving children Viserys and the newborn Daenerys had already fled to Essos.

After Robert was crowned king, he named Stannis Lord of Dragonstone, giving him the islands at the entrance of Blackwater Bay as well as the nearby peninsula of Massey's Hook, citing the fief's strategic importance. However, Stannis feels slighted over this as their younger brother Renly, who has no accolades of significance, is named Lord of Storm's End and given dominion over the entirety of the Stormlands, which Stannis believes to be his rightful inheritance.

Several years later, Stannis married Lady Selyse Florent, but a drunken Robert soiled the wedding by deflowering Selyse's cousin Delena (who later gave birth to a bastard son Edric) on Stannis' wedding bed during the feast, further insulting Stannis. Stannis and Selyse have a single daughter together, Shireen, who nearly dies after contracting greyscale in infancy and has since been left disfigured.

When Balon Greyjoy rebelled against the Iron Throne in 289 AC, Stannis, who is appointed Robert's master of ships, commanded the royal fleet and destroys the Iron Fleet under the command of Victarion Greyjoy at Fair Isle and conquered Great Wyk, the largest of the Iron Islands, adding to his significant military resume.

Just prior to the beginning of the first novel A Game of Thrones, Stannis comes to suspect that Robert's three children with Queen Cersei Lannister, Joffrey, Myrcella and Tommen, are not actually his biological children. He knows that Robert will not believe his word alone, so he reveals his suspicions to Robert's Hand of the King and trusted mentor, Lord Jon Arryn. The two lords the investigate and discover several bastard children fathered by Robert in King's Landing (among them a blacksmith apprentice named Gendry) and begin to gather evidence of the bastardy of Cersei's children. Jon Arryn also agrees to foster his young son and heir, Robert Arryn, at Dragonstone. However, Jon Arryn then dies unexpectedly and Stannis suspects that it is the Lannisters who assassinated Jon Arryn, so he immediately leaves the capital for Dragonstone.

=== Appearance and personality ===
Stannis is frequently described as a tall, sinewy and broad-shouldered man who towers over others. Despite being in his mid-30s, Stannis is balding, lacking the long black hair of his brothers, although he keeps a close-cropped beard of the signature Baratheon black. His face is described as "tight like cured leather" with hollow, gaunt cheeks. His has the Baratheon trait of blue eyes, which are described by Asha Greyjoy as "deep, sunken pits" with a powerful stare that suggests an "iron ferocity".

Stannis' most prominent characteristics are his flinty and austere demeanor, unrelenting stubbornness, and powerful sense of duty and justice, the latter of which he is infamous throughout Westeros. He rarely forgives a slight; Jon Snow once comments that "Stannis Baratheon with a grievance was like a mastiff with a bone; he gnawed it down to splinters." His signature tic is grinding his teeth, often in the face of unpleasant or unforeseen circumstances. He is a renowned commander, sailor, and warrior, although he is a better tactician than fighter. Stannis is known for his brusqueness and lack of tact in social situations and finds himself uncomfortable around women, including his own wife Selyse. He abhors brothels and once tried to have them banned from King's Landing, which made him unpopular with the smallfolk there. He dresses plainly in dark clothing and is rarely seen without his sword and dagger. Stannis is plagued with bitterness at the lack of respect and affection he has been shown by his older brother King Robert, and even in childhood was described by the Baratheon family maester as "the most unloved of the three"; a "solemn and joyless" child "mature beyond his years". Stannis is an atheist, despite claims that he is being manipulated by the red priestess Melisandre.

Although Stannis suffers from a lack of support and resources during the War of Five Kings, he is frequently described by his adversaries, including Tywin Lannister, as the most dangerous rival claimant. Above all, he is characterized by his fearless and uncompromising pursuit of justice and duty, as described by Varys: "His claim is the true one; he is known for his prowess as a battle commander, and he is utterly without mercy. There is no creature on earth half so terrifying as a truly just man."

== Storylines ==
Personal coat of arms of Stannis Baratheon

=== Novels ===
Stannis is not a point-of-view character in the novels, so his actions are witnessed and interpreted through the eyes of other people, predominantly Davos Seaworth and Jon Snow, and later, Asha and Theon Greyjoy.

==== A Game of Thrones ====
When King Robert Baratheon travels to Winterfell to name Eddard Stark as his new Hand of the King, Stannis has already fled to Dragonstone with his forces, including most of the royal navy. Stannis suspects the involvement of Cersei Lannister, the wife of the king, in the sudden death of the previous Hand, Lord Jon Arryn, with whom Stannis had investigated Robert's many bastard children. It is later revealed that the true culprit was Jon's wife, Lysa Tully, who was persuaded to poison her husband by her lover Petyr Baelish.

After assuming the position as the new Hand, Eddard learns of Stannis' and Jon's investigations and conducts his own investigation, discovering that Cersei's children are not Robert's but instead the products of her incestuous affair with her twin brother, Ser Jaime Lannister. After Robert's death from a hunting accident, Eddard tries to change Robert's inheritance from the de jure heir, Crown Prince Joffrey Baratheon, to Stannis, who by proper primogeniture would be Robert's legitimate heir, but he is betrayed by his own daughter Sansa (who still wants to marry Joffrey and thus naively informs Edward's plan to Cersei) and confidant Petyr Baelish (who turned the City Watch against the Starks instead). After losing the political struggle and all his men massacred in the subsequent violent purge by House Lannister, Eddard is imprisoned and later publicly beheaded, despite already agreeing to swear fealty (under the threat of his daughters' lives) to Joffrey as the new king.

==== A Clash of Kings ====
Stannis comes under the spiritual influence of the foreign red priestess of R'hllor, Melisandre, who believes that Stannis is the reincarnation of Azor Ahai, a messianic figure in her faith. Stannis declares himself the one true king of Westeros, citing Joffrey's illegitimacy as a bastard of incest, but most of the Baratheon bannermen instead support the claim of his more charismatic younger brother Renly, as does the powerful House Tyrell due to Renly's nominal marriage to Margaery Tyrell. Stannis tries to negotiate with Renly, offering him the chance to become his heir, but Renly laughingly rejects him and plans to use the superior military strength to destroy Stannis' army the next day. However, Renly unexpectedly dies the following evening, assassinated by a shadow demon conjured by Melisandre using Stannis's life force. After his death, many of Renly's bannermen immediately switch allegiance to Stannis, though the Tyrell forces withdraw. One of Renly's personal guards, Brienne of Tarth, goes rogue and swears to avenge his death by assassinating Stannis but is talked out of it by Catelyn Stark.

Melisandre later uses the same shadow magic again to assassinate Ser Cortnay Penrose, the defiant castellan of Storm's End who still refuses to submit to Stannis after Renly's death, making the whole of Stormlands bending the knee to Stannis. Now equipped with the strongest single standing army and navy in Westeros, Stannis attempts to capture the capital city King's Landing with an amphibious assault through Blackwater Bay, but Tyrion Lannister traps and destroys his vanguard fleet with a hidden boom before detonating incendiary wildfire on the Blackwater River. With many of his men killed in the fire attack, Stannis' remaining forces still make landing and begin sieging the city, nearly claiming victory. However, House Tyrell have sided with the Lannisters due to the latter's offer to have Joffrey marry the widowed Margaery, and the Lannister–Tyrell reinforcements arrive just in time to relieve King's Landing, attacking and routing Stannis' exhausted forces from the rear. With the help of Rolland Storm, the Bastard of Nightsong, Stannis manages to flee the battlefield safely, but the defeat at the Blackwater effectively ends his capacity to further challenge the Lannisters' hold on the Iron Throne.

==== A Storm of Swords ====
Stannis retreats to Dragonstone with what is left of his army (around 1,500 men-at-arms), but the hired sellsails have all abandoned him. He imprisons his Hand, Lord Alester Florent, one of his wife's uncles, for trying to offer terms of surrender to the Lannisters. Another of Selyse's uncles, Ser Axell Florent, castellan of Dragonstone, aims to become Stannis' new Hand of the King and suggests a plan to attack Claw Isle in retaliation for Lord Celtigar bending the knee to Joffrey. However, Davos Seaworth, who returns after surviving falling overboard at the Blackwater, derides an attack on this defenseless island as evil, and for this honest counsel, Stannis names Davos as his new Hand instead.

Melisandre advises Stannis to burn Edric Storm, one of King Robert's known bastards, as a human sacrifice for blood magic to raise dragons from Dragonstone. Stannis is conflicted about burning his biological nephew but agrees to use Edric's blood collected by leeches to curse the three rival kings: Joffrey Baratheon, Robb Stark and Balon Greyjoy. Later, after the unexpected deaths of Robb (who is murdered at the Red Wedding), Balon (who suspiciously falls of a chain bridge) and Joffrey (who is poisoned at his own royal wedding to Margaery) seem to prove the cursing power of a king's blood, Stannis considers sacrificing Edric. However, Davos foils this plan by hastily smuggling off Edric from Dragonstone to the Free Cities for protection, and then convinces Stannis to instead sail to the Wall and rescue the Night's Watch from the invading wildling army. After Melisandre burns Alester Florent as a sacrifice to R'hllor to ensure favorable winds, Stannis takes most of his remaining army and sailors north to relieve the wildlings' threat on the Wall.

After arriving at Eastwatch-by-the-Sea, Stannis dispatches Davos to go to White Harbor in order to convince other Northern lords to join his cause, before marching west outside the Wall to relieve the wildlings' siege upon Castle Black. The sudden arrival of Stannis' army catches Mance Rayder, the King-Beyond-the-Wall, by surprise, and Stannis' cavalry routs the entire wildling horde with few casualties, taking hundreds of prisoners. Afterwards, Stannis remains at Castle Black to negotiate a settlement over the captured wildlings and offers to legitimize Eddard Stark's bastard son Jon Snow as the new lord of Winterfell if Jon swears loyalty to him and joins the fight against House Bolton. Despite being tempted, Jon declines the offer as he has made an oath binding him to lifelong service in the Night's Watch and does not want Winterfell's godswood to be burned by Melisandre. Later, Stannis pressures the Night's Watch to finish electing a new Lord Commander, and Jon is eventually elected through cunning secret lobbying by Samwell Tarly.

==== A Feast for Crows and A Dance with Dragons ====
Stannis sends ravens to the Northern houses asking for their support in the name of the legitimate king, but only House Karstark and a small faction of House Umber swear allegiance. Stannis seemingly has Mance Rayder (who, unaware by Stannis, is actually another wildling chieftain named Rattleshirt disguised as Mance by Melisandre's illusion magic) burned at the stake, and most of the wildling prisoners end up bending the knee to Stannis. To rally the Northern houses to his side, Stannis intends to attack House Bolton's ancestral castle, the Dreadfort, with the help of Arnolf Karstark, castellan of Karhold. In reality, Arnolf is working with the Boltons, secretly relaying intelligence and hoping to entrap Stannis, in order to have his great-nephew Harrion Karstark (who is the legitimate heir of Karhold but was captured by House Lannister as a hostage prisoner of war) executed so that his own branch of the family can take control of Karhold. However, Jon Snow wants Stannis to hand over the wildling prisoners to him so he can reinforce the Wall's defense. In exchange, Jon advises Stannis to instead march west and win over the support of mountain clans, who are fiercely loyal to late Eddard Stark, and then attack the Ironborn invaders so that Stannis can rally other Northern lords on the west coast.

Stannis accepts Jon's counsel and marches west, defeating the Ironborn raiders holding Deepwood Motte and taking Asha Greyjoy captive. He restores the castle to House Glover, thus winning their support and that of the nearby House Mormont and the mountain cadet branch of House Flint. With his forces now greatly bolstered, Stannis then marches on Winterfell to confront the Boltons, joined by the men of Arnolf Karstark and Mors Umber (who has also captured the escaped Theon Greyjoy and "Arya Stark" (who in reality is Sansa Stark's childhood companion Jeyne Poole, forced to marry the sadistic Ramsay Bolton in order to give House Bolton fake legitimacy over Winterfell), but his army is waylaid by heavy snows and forced to camp at a small lakeside crofter's village three days' march away from Winterfell.

Some time later, Jon Snow receives a letter allegedly written by Ramsay, claiming that Stannis has been defeated and killed, though it is unknown how much of the letter is true or whether Ramsay even wrote it. George R. R. Martin confirmed to a fan in 2015 that Stannis is still alive in the books.

==== The Winds of Winter ====
In December 2011, Martin posted a sample chapter from the yet-unfinished sixth book, The Winds of Winter, told from Theon Greyjoy's viewpoint, wherein Stannis is actively and efficiently preparing for the looming battle against the army of the Bolton–Frey alliance. He secures a war loan from the Iron Bank of Braavos by signing a blood contract with the banker Tycho Nestoris, whose convoy managed to find Stannis'army, and plans to immediately send Tycho back to the Wall for safety. Tycho also relays a message from Jon Snow informing Stannis of Arnolf Karstark's planned treachery, which Jon has learned from Arnold's escaped niece Alys. Stannis then arrests Arnolf, his son Arthor and his three grandsons, and plans to execute them. He also subdued Tybald, the Dreadfort maester who accompanied Arnolf, and Tybald, out of fear, confesses that he has already messaged Stannis' position to the Boltons in Winterfell.

Stannis then sends Ser Justin Massey to escort Tycho and "Arya Stark" back to Castle Black to reunite her with Jon Snow, in gratitude for Jon's counsel of gathering the Northern mountain clans. Massey is to then travel to Braavos and use the Iron Bank loan to hire 20,000 sellswords for Stannis' future campaigns. Stannis tells Massey that, if he is reported dead, even if the news is true, Massey is to follow orders and keep supporting his daughter Shireen's claim on the Iron Throne.

Stannis then interrogates Theon Greyjoy for information regarding the Boltons' military strength. When Theon taunts Stannis for not taking Ramsay seriously enough, Stannis confidently reveals that he already has a battle plan to utilize the terrain against the incoming Frey army. Stannis next receives Asha Greyjoy and informs her that her brother Theon must be executed, as showing him mercy would mean losing all of the Northmen. To spare Theon the agony of death by burning, Asha pleads with Stannis to personally behead him in front of a weirwood tree in the tradition of the Northmen.

=== TV adaptation ===
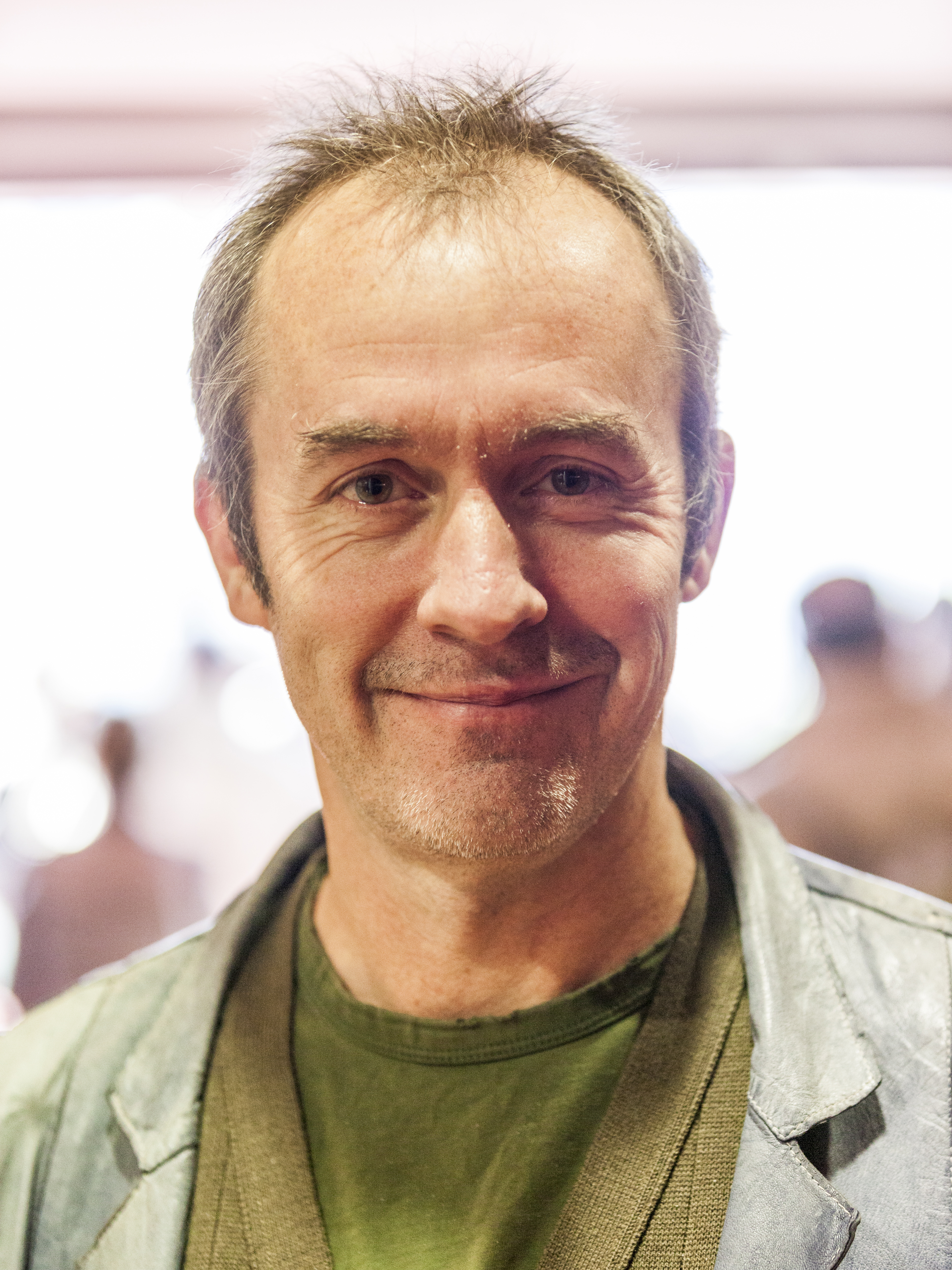
Stephen Dillane plays the role of Stannis Baratheon in the television series.

Stephen Dillane plays Stannis Baratheon in the television adaptation of the book series.

==== Season 2 ====
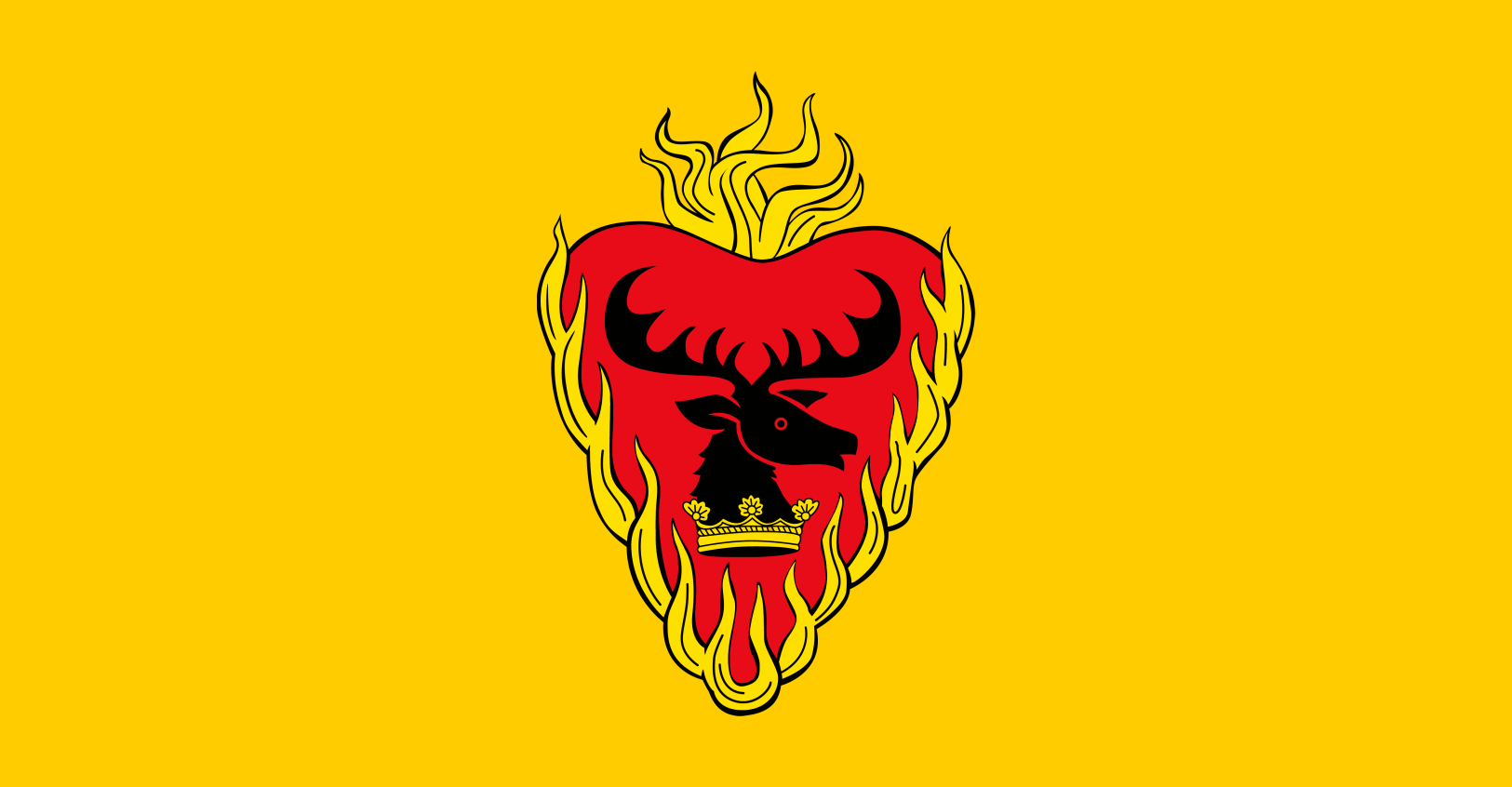
Stannis's personal banner in the TV series.

Stannis falls under the influence of Melisandre, a priestess of R'hllor who believes Stannis is the reincarnation of a legendary hero from her religion, Azor Ahai. After Robert's death, Stannis asserts that he is the legitimate heir to the Iron Throne since Cersei's children are illegitimate, conceived through incest. Nonetheless, most of the Baratheon bannermen back the claim of the more charming but younger Renly. When Stannis confronts Renly, he offers to make him his heir if he supports his claim. However, Renly declines, using the negotiation as an opportunity to mock Stannis and plans to kill him in battle the next day. Melisandre, who had seduced Stannis, gives birth to a shadow demon bearing Stannis's face that kills Renly, and many of Renly's bannermen immediately swear allegiance to Stannis. He then attacks King's Landing by sailing up Blackwater Bay. Stannis's force breaches the walls, but due to Tyrion Lannister's use of wildfire and the arrival of last-minute Lannister and Tyrell reinforcements, he is defeated. Nonetheless, he is convinced to continue fighting by Melisandre and is further convinced by her magic as she shows him a vision of a battle in the flames.

==== Season 3 ====
Stannis acquires one of Robert's bastards, Gendry, from the Brotherhood Without Banners and plans to sacrifice him to further his quest for the Iron Throne. After Davos Seaworth questions his course of action, Stannis has three leeches' worth of blood drawn from Gendry and throws them into a fire, calling for the deaths of Robb Stark, Balon Greyjoy, and Joffrey Baratheon. Upon the news of Robb's death, Davos releases Gendry to prevent him from being sacrificed. Stannis subsequently sentences Davos to death but is swayed by Melisandre, who encourages him to travel North to aid the Night's Watch against the White Walkers emerging from beyond the Wall.

==== Season 4 ====
Stannis hears of Joffrey's death and chastises Davos again for releasing Gendry and not finding him a suitable army, prompting Davos to write to the Iron Bank of Braavos in Stannis's name to help pay for an army. The Iron Bank nearly refuses Stannis's request, but Davos manages to convince them that Stannis is the only one they can turn to since Tywin Lannister is nearing old age. Stannis and his army arrive at the Wall shortly after the Battle of Castle Black, interrupting a parley between Jon Snow and Mance Rayder and crushing the wildling force. Stannis learns that Jon is Ned Stark's son, and on Jon's advice, he places Mance and his men under arrest. He is later present at the funeral of the Night's Watch brothers who died during the Battle for Castle Black.

==== Season 5 ====
Stannis begins plans to retake the North from Roose Bolton, hoping to recruit Mance's wildling army if Mance will bend the knee to him. Mance refuses, and Stannis has him burnt at the stake. Stannis offers to legitimise Jon as a Stark to win the loyalty of the Northerners who refuse to recognise Stannis as their king, but Jon decides to remain loyal to his vows to the Night's Watch. Stannis marches on Winterfell, but a large snowstorm delays his army. In the chaos, Ramsay Bolton and his men infiltrate Stannis's camp and destroy all supplies and horses. Melisandre persuades a reluctant Stannis to sacrifice Shireen to ensure victory. Although the snowstorm lifts, half of Stannis's army deserts him, Selyse commits suicide out of guilt, and Melisandre flees to Castle Black. Stannis decides to complete the march on foot. As his army arrives at Winterfell, it is swiftly defeated by a cavalry charge led by Ramsay Bolton. Stannis survives the battle, but is confronted by Brienne of Tarth, a former member of Renly's Kingsguard. Stannis confesses to killing Renly with blood magic, and Brienne executes him, telling Stannis she is killing him in the name of the 'rightful' King Renly.

=== Critical reception ===
The English actor Stephen Dillane has received positive reviews for his performance as Stannis Baratheon, especially in the fifth season. In her review of "Sons of the Harpy", Sarah Hughes of The Guardian wrote, "Stephen Dillane has always been wonderful at showing us the core of this rigid, complex man." His performance on the same episode also received positive reviews from Vulture. Harri Sargeant of Hypable wrote, "Stephen Dillane has always been one of the classiest actors on the show, and his last moments as the King Who Almost Was saw as commanding a performance as ever." In her review for "Mother's Mercy", Meghan O'Keefe of Decider wrote, "Whether you like Stannis or not, you have to admit that Stephen Dillane delivered a monumental performance this season." Cindy Davis of Pajiba wrote: "After Shireen's seemingly pointless death, it's a testament to Stephen Dillane's phenomenal skills that we could feel anything at all for a man who watched his daughter burned alive." Nick Steinberg of Goliath wrote, "Credit has to go to Stephen Dillane for his performance, especially in these last few episodes where he's had to convey a form of grim tragedy that's effectively conveyed the character's downfall." For his part, Dillane expressed misgivings about his performance, telling The Times newspaper, "I didn't know what I was doing until we'd finished filming and it was too late. The damage had been done. I thought no one would believe in me and I was rather disheartened by the end. I felt I'd built the castle on non-existent foundations.”

== Family tree of House Baratheon ==
Family tree of House Baratheon

Ormund	Rhaelle; Targaryen
Steffon	Cassana; Estermont
Delena; Florent	Robert; 283–298	Cersei; Lannister	Jaime; Lannister	Stannis	Selyse; Florent	Renly	Margaery; Tyrell (Note: Margaery Tyrell first married Renly, then Joffrey, and then Tommen.)
Edric; Storm	Gendry	Bella	Myrcella (Note: Joffrey, Myrcella and Tommen, although recognized by Robert, are secretly the illegitimate children of Jaime Lannister.)	Shireen
Mya; Stone	Barra	11 others	Joffrey; 298–300	Margaery; Tyrell	Tommen; 300–

== Sources ==
- Martin, George R. R. (September 1996). A Game of Thrones. A Song of Ice and Fire (US hardcover ed.). Bantam Spectra. ISBN 978-0-553-10354-0.
