= Joffrey Baratheon =

Character in A Song of Ice and Fire and Game of Thrones

- A Song of Ice and Fire character Game of Thrones character
- Jack Gleeson as Joffrey Baratheon
- First appearance: Literature: A Game of Thrones (1996); Television: "Winter Is Coming" (2011)
- Last appearance: Literature: A Storm of Swords (2000); Television: "Breaker of Chains" (2014)
- Created by: George R. R. Martin
- Based on: Edward of Westminster, Prince of Wales
- Adapted by: David Benioff; D. B. Weiss (Game of Thrones)
- Portrayed by: Jack Gleeson

In-universe information
- Nicknames: Joffrey the Illborn; The Young Usurper
- Titles: King of the Andals, the Rhoynar, and the First Men; Lord of the Seven Kingdoms; Protector of the Realm
- Weapon: Crossbow; Valyrian sword (named Widow's Wail)
- Family: House Lannister (by birth); House Baratheon (legally by birth); House Tyrell (by marriage)
- Spouse: Margaery Tyrell (unconsummated)
- Relatives: Cersei Lannister (mother); Jaime Lannister (biological father); Robert Baratheon (legal father); Myrcella Baratheon (sister); Tommen Baratheon (brother); Tywin Lannister (grandfather); Joanna Lannister (grandmother); Tyrion Lannister (uncle); Kevan Lannister (granduncle); Mya Stone (legal half-sister); Bella (legal half-sister); Gendry (legal half-brother); Edric Storm (legal half-brother); Barra (legal half-sister); Other legal half-siblings; Steffon Baratheon (legal grandfather); Cassana Estermont (legal grandmother); Stannis Baratheon (legal uncle); Renly Baratheon (legal uncle); Shireen Baratheon (legal cousin)

Joffrey Baratheon is a fictional character in A Song of Ice and Fire series of epic fantasy novels by American author George R. R. Martin, and one of several antagonists of its HBO television adaptation, Game of Thrones, alongside Ramsay Bolton. Introduced in 1996's A Game of Thrones, he subsequently appears in A Clash of Kings (1998) and A Storm of Swords (2000).

Joffrey is officially the eldest son and heir of King Robert Baratheon and Cersei Lannister, but he is actually the eldest child of an incestuous relationship between Cersei and her twin brother, Jaime Lannister. After Cersei engineers Robert's death, she conspires to secure the throne for her illegitimate son. This, along with Joffrey's execution of Lord Ned Stark of Winterfell, triggers a power struggle in Westeros known as the War of Five Kings. His mother's powerful family, the Lannisters, manages to remove most opposition to its rule, despite the boy-king's frequent blunders. He is characterized as a spoiled, sadistic bully. He frequently torments his family and Sansa Stark, to whom he is betrothed in the first two novels. He later marries Margaery Tyrell but is killed by poison during his wedding reception.

Joffrey is portrayed by Irish actor Jack Gleeson in the television adaptation, Game of Thrones, a role for which he received international recognition and critical praise.

== Overview ==
Joffrey Baratheon is not a point-of-view character in the novels, so his actions are witnessed and interpreted through the eyes of other characters, such as his uncle Tyrion Lannister and his one-time fiancée, Sansa Stark. He inherits his mother's traditional Lannister looks—blond hair and green eyes—and is believed by many to be very handsome. His appearance is referred to as his one redeeming quality.

== Character description ==
In public, Joffrey is allegedly the eldest son and heir of King Robert Baratheon and Queen Cersei Lannister, both of whom entered into a political marriage alliance after Robert took the throne by force from the "Mad King", Aerys II Targaryen. In reality, his biological father is his mother's twin brother, Jaime Lannister. He has a younger sister, Myrcella, and a younger brother, Tommen, both of whom are also products of Jaime and Cersei's incestuous relationship. Their sole biological grandparents, Tywin and Joanna Lannister, were also first cousins. Joffrey is 12 years old at the beginning of A Game of Thrones (1996).

Joffrey is an amoral sadist who masks his cruelty with a thin layer of charm. This is best exemplified by his response when his then-fiancée, Sansa, insults him: Joffrey claims that his mother taught him never to strike a woman, and thus he orders a knight of the Kingsguard to strike her instead. He enjoys forcing people to fight to the death and enforces cruel punishments for lesser crimes. He shows no sense of personal responsibility, blaming others for failures. He lacks self-control and often insults his allies and family members. He is also impulsive, which often leads to rash decisions. He seems to have virtually no interests other than sadism and extreme violence, paying no attention to governing his kingdom or anything involving sex, even when offered exceptionally beautiful women. This behavior could be linked to the fact that Joffrey is the product of incest. Though he takes pleasure in violence, Joffrey is shown to be a coward when faced with danger to himself and often avoids real fighting.

== Storylines ==
Joffrey Baratheon's personal coat of arms

=== A Game of Thrones ===
Prince Joffrey is taken by his parents to Winterfell and betrothed to Sansa Stark to create an alliance between House Baratheon and House Stark. At first, Joffrey is kind and polite to Sansa. However, he refuses to show sympathy with the family when Bran Stark falls from a tower, until physically forced to by his uncle, Tyrion Lannister. While on the Kingsroad to King's Landing, Joffrey and Sansa come across Arya Stark practicing swordplay with a commoner, Mycah. Joffrey accuses Mycah of assaulting a noble girl and makes a cut on his face with a sword. This causes Arya to hit Joffrey, allowing Mycah to escape. When Joffrey then turns on Arya, her direwolf, Nymeria, attacks Joffrey, injuring him. Later, Joffrey lies about the attack, saying it was unprovoked and demands that Nymeria be killed; however, Sansa's direwolf, Lady, is killed instead. He later has his bodyguard Sandor "the Hound" Clegane hunt down and kill Mycah.

Later, Eddard Stark discovers that Joffrey is not King Robert's biological son and refuses to acknowledge Joffrey's claim to the throne when Robert dies. He is taken into custody. On Sansa's pleas, Eddard issues a false confession of his treason. Joffrey promises Sansa that he would be merciful but then beheads Eddard anyway, later forcing Sansa to look upon her father's head.

=== A Clash of Kings ===
Joffrey is briefly seen in A Clash of Kings (1998). He rules with whims and caprice, making it difficult for even his mother to control him. Sansa is imprisoned at his whim, and he frequently has his guards beat her when she displeases him. He punishes her for each of her brother's victories in the war. When Stannis Baratheon attacks King's Landing, Joffrey leaves the battlefield, damaging the morale of his army. The battle is only won by his uncle Tyrion's use of wildfire and his grandfather Tywin's last-minute counterattack aided by the forces of House Tyrell.

=== A Storm of Swords ===
Joffrey sets aside his earlier betrothal to Sansa Stark in favor of Margaery Tyrell, cementing an alliance between the Lannisters and House Tyrell. At Tyrion and Sansa's wedding, he humiliates his uncle and is outraged when his uncle threatens him after he commands him to consummate their marriage. Tyrion only avoids punishment when his father Tywin assures Joffrey that his uncle was drunk and had no intention of threatening the king. Later, after the events of the "Red Wedding", Joffrey gleefully plans to serve Sansa her recently deceased brother's head. His uncle Tyrion and his grandfather Tywin are outraged, and the former threatens Joffrey once again. After another disagreement, Tywin sends Joffrey to his room, much to Joffrey's chagrin. During his wedding feast, he repeatedly torments Tyrion, presenting a pair of jousting dwarves as entertainment to humiliate his uncle, whom he also forces to act as his cupbearer. At the conclusion of the dinner, however, Joffrey dies from poisoned wine. Tyrion is falsely accused and arrested by Cersei, but it is later revealed that Lady Olenna Tyrell and Lord Petyr Baelish were the true perpetrators.

=== Family tree ===
Descendants of Tytos Lannister

Tytos | Jeyne; Marbrand
Joanna | Tywin | Emmon; Frey | Genna | Kevan | Dorna; Swyft | Tygett | Darlessa; Marbrand | Gerion | Briony
Robert; Baratheon | Cersei | Jaime | Tysha (Note: Tyrion's first wife was a peasant girl named Tysha. The marriage was later annulled by Lord Tywin's order.) | Tyrion | Sansa; Stark | Amerei; Frey | Lancel | Martyn | Willem | Janei | Tyrek | Ermesande; Hayford | Joy; Hill
Joffrey; Baratheon (Note: Though officially Robert's children, Joffrey, Myrcella and Tommen are the products of an incestuous affair between Cersei and Jaime.) | Myrcella; Baratheon | Margaery; Tyrell | Tommen; Baratheon | Tion; Frey | "Red" Walder; Frey | Jeyne; Darry | Cleos; Frey | Lyonel; Frey | Melesa Crakehall
Tywin; Frey | Willem; Frey

References and notes:

== TV adaptation ==
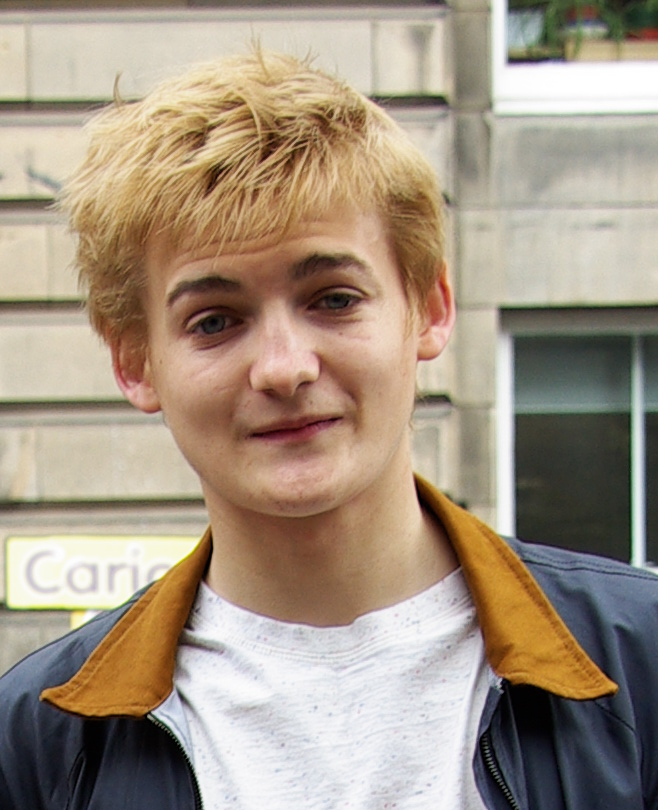
Jack Gleeson plays the role of Joffrey Baratheon in the television series.

=== Season 1 ===
In Season 1 of Game of Thrones, Joffrey Baratheon is introduced as the arrogant and cruel heir to the Iron Throne. He is initially presented as a charming prince, betrothed to Sansa Stark, but his true nature as a spoiled, sadistic bully quickly emerges. He torments Sansa, enjoys violence, and is ultimately responsible for the execution of Ned Stark, setting the stage for the War of the Five Kings. After Robert's death, Cersei Lannister and her father Tywin Lannister make Joffrey King, and his mother uses him as a puppet. He is also betrothed to Sansa Stark to cement an alliance between the Houses of Stark and Lannister. A cruel tyrant, Joffrey makes sadistic torture and mass murder the main features of his kingdom, and even has Sansa's father Ned executed for treason (which he declares he will never allow to go unpunished) over Sansa's pleas for mercy and Cersei's disapproval.

=== Season 2 ===
Joffrey Baratheon, though only a boy, continues to rule as King of Westeros, wielding his power with cruelty and immaturity. He further solidifies his alliance with House Tyrell by setting aside his betrothal to Sansa Stark in favor of Margaery Tyrell. His reign is marked by his harsh treatment of Sansa, his dismissal of the respected Ser Barristan Selmy, and his overall sadistic behavior. Tyrion Lannister, as Hand of the King, must navigate Joffrey's volatile nature while managing the political complexities of the realm. Joffrey's tyranny worsens the situation with the Lannisters' war effort, as his uncle (and secretly, father) Jaime (Nikolaj Coster-Waldau) is captured by the Starks, and Joffrey's "paternal uncles" Renly (Gethin Anthony) and Stannis (Stephen Dillane) challenge his claim to the Iron Throne. Joffrey frequently orders his Kingsguard to beat Sansa. His cruelty and ignorance of the commoners' suffering makes him unpopular after he orders the City Watch to kill all of his "father"'s bastard children in King's Landing; consequently, he is almost killed during a riot. When Stannis attacks King's Landing, Joffrey serves only as a figurehead and avoids the heavy fighting. When the battle eventually turns in Stannis' favor, Cersei calls her son into the safety of the castle, damaging the morale of his army. The battle is only won by his uncle Tyrion (Peter Dinklage) and grandfather Tywin, aided by the forces of House Tyrell. To cement the alliance between those families, Joffrey's engagement to Sansa is annulled so he can marry Margaery Tyrell (Natalie Dormer).

=== Season 3 ===
The marriage is yet to take place, and rifts are growing between Joffrey, and his uncle Tyrion and grandfather Tywin, who are (in their respective ways) rebutting his cruelty. Joffrey also seems to take little interest in his betrothed, but is amazed and altered by her ways of winning the people's favor, in which he takes part. At Tyrion and Sansa's wedding, he humiliates his uncle and is outraged when his uncle threatens him after Joffrey commands him to consummate the marriage. Tyrion only avoids punishment when his father Tywin assures Joffrey that Tyrion was drunk and had no intention of threatening the king. Later, after the events of the "Red Wedding", Joffrey gleefully plans on serving Sansa her recently deceased brother Robb's (Richard Madden) head. Tyrion and Tywin are outraged, and the former threatens Joffrey once again. After another disagreement, Tywin sends Joffrey to his room, much to Joffrey's chagrin.

=== Season 4 ===
Joffrey finally marries Margaery. During his wedding feast, he repeatedly torments Tyrion and Sansa, presenting an offensive play about "The War of the Five Kings", with each of the kings played by dwarves to humiliate his uncle, whom he also forces to act as his cupbearer. The wedding feast turns into a dramatic spectacle of humiliation for Tyrion Lannister at the hands of Joffrey. The festivities conclude with Joffrey's shocking and sudden death by poisoning. His last act is an attempt to point at Tyrion, and as a result Tyrion is falsely accused and ordered arrested by Cersei, but it is later revealed that Lady Olenna Tyrell and Lord Petyr Baelish were the true perpetrators. Olenna, Margaery's grandmother, later confides to Margaery that she would never have let her marry "that beast". Following Joffrey's funeral, his younger brother and heir, Tommen, is crowned King and proceeds to marry Margaery.

=== Development and reception ===
In January 2007, HBO secured the rights to adapt Martin's series for television. Jack Gleeson was cast as Joffrey Baratheon. Gleeson received critical acclaim for his portrayal. In 2016, Rolling Stone ranked the character #4 in their list of the "40 Greatest TV Villains of All Time". Author Martin described Joffrey as similar to "five or six people that I went to school with ... a classic bully ... incredibly spoiled". Gleeson would cite Joaquin Phoenix's portrayal of Commodus in Gladiator as a big influence for his performance.
