= Ned Stark =

Character in A Song of Ice and Fire and Game of Thrones

Eddard Stark
- A Song of Ice and Fire character Game of Thrones character
- Sean Bean as Ned Stark in Game of Thrones
- First appearance: Literature: A Game of Thrones (1996); Television: "Winter Is Coming" (2011)
- Last appearance: Literature: A Feast for Crows (2005) (Note: An imaginary vision of Ned silently mocks Cersei in the crowd during her walk of atonement.); Television: "The Dragon and the Wolf" (2017)
- Created by: George R. R. Martin
- Adapted by: D. B. Weiss & David Benioff (Game of Thrones)
- Portrayed by: Sean Bean; Sebastian Croft (child); Robert Aramayo (Young Man)

In-universe information
- Gender: Male
- Titles: Lord of Winterfell; Warden of the North; Hand of the King; Television: Lord Paramount of the North
- Family: House Stark
- Spouse: Catelyn Tully
- Children: Robb Stark; Sansa Stark; Arya Stark; Bran Stark; Rickon Stark; Novels: Jon Snow
- Relatives: Rickard Stark (father); Lyarra Stark (mother); Brandon Stark (brother); Lyanna Stark (sister); Benjen Stark (brother); Television: Jon Snow (nephew/adopted son)
- Origin: Winterfell

Eddard "Ned" Stark is a fictional character from American writer George R. R. Martin's A Song of Ice and Fire epic fantasy series, a prominent point-of-view character in the first novel of the series, A Game of Thrones (1996), and a major character in the first season of HBO's television adaptation, Game of Thrones.

Ned is the patriarch of House Stark of Winterfell, the ruling house and lord paramount of the North, which is the largest of the Seven Kingdoms of Westeros. As the most trusted friend of King Robert Baratheon, Ned is widely renowned and respected throughout the kingdom for his unwavering morality, honor and justice. Although he is portrayed as the main character at the beginning of the series, the plot twist of his execution near the end of the first novel and the first season of the TV adaptation shocked both the book readers and TV viewers.

Ned is portrayed by veteran English actor Sean Bean in the first season of Game of Thrones, as a child by Sebastian Croft in the sixth season, and as a young adult by Robert Aramayo in the sixth and seventh seasons, respectively. Bean received top billing of the first season for the role, and was nominated for a Saturn Award for Best Actor on Television and a Scream Award for Best Fantasy Actor. He and the rest of the cast were also nominated for Screen Actors Guild Awards for Outstanding Performance by an Ensemble in a Drama Series in 2011.

== Character ==
=== Description ===
Ned Stark is introduced in A Game of Thrones (1996) as the virtuous and honorable patriarch of House Stark of Winterfell, the lord paramount and warden family of the North. He is in his mid-30s and happily married to Lady Catelyn Stark (née Tully). He is father to five trueborn children—Robb, Sansa, Arya, Bran, and Rickon (all born to Catelyn)—as well as a bastard son, Jon Snow (whose maternal parentage remains a tabooed secret). He also acts as a guardian to a ward, Theon Greyjoy (who is really a diplomatic hostage but has been treated kindly as a foster son). He is a lifelong friend of King Robert Baratheon, the ruling monarch of the Seven Kingdoms of Westeros, who personally visits Winterfell at the beginning of the novel to invite and persuade Ned to become the new Hand of the King.

Ned was raised as a military officer from childhood and never intended to inherit the family lordship until his heir apparent elder brother, Brandon (who was Catelyn's original betrothed), was sadistically executed by "Mad King" Aerys II Targaryen, an outrageous act of tyranny that forced Ned to rise in rebellion alongside his friend Robert and their guardian, Jon Arryn, and overthrow House Targaryen. Due to his upbringing, Ned possesses an unwavering conscience of honor, loyalty, and justice, and as the moral staple of the story, a visceral distaste towards the manipulative power struggles of royal court politics. At the start of the series, he is content to remain in his homeland in the North, far from the treacherous political intrigues of other southern dominions. His family name, Stark, is a word play that both emphasizes the resilience of his noble family and serves as an indication of his personal resistance to moral compromise. Still, his boundaries are increasingly tested over the course of the novel. Finding himself a key player in the escalating political intrigue of King's Landing, Ned struggles as his own sense of honor draws him into corrupt goings-on at court. As the tale progresses, he begins to see the importance of moral and practical compromises to achieve a just end. He is ultimately forced to choose between his family's safety and doing what is right. Sean Bean said of the character:

"He's a good man trying to do his best in the middle of this corruption, he's a fish out of water, he's used to being up North in Winterfell where people are pretty straight and pragmatic, and he comes down to a place where people are playing games and backstabbing... he's a principled man who tries to hold things together. This is a journey that he makes where ultimately his loyalty causes his downfall."

=== Development and overview ===
Publishers Weekly noted in 1996 that, despite the honest Ned Stark's intervention in court politics, "no amount of heroism or good intentions can keep the realm under control." From his very introduction, Ned is portrayed as a noble hero and set up to be the heart of the story. With fifteen chapters devoted to his point of view, more than any other single character in the novel, he is presented as a primary character, and the main storyline of A Game of Thrones, the drama in King's Landing, is told almost entirely from his perspective. In the London Review of Books, John Lanchester wrote that everything about Ned is designed to gain audience sympathy, from his strong sense of honor and moral compass to his compassion towards his wife and children. Readers are led to believe that Ned will be the main character of the series, but ultimately he is, from a literary perspective, a classic decoy protagonist. After struggling to keep himself and the kingdom on a moral path for the entire novel, the only option that remains to save his family is to put aside his honor; he does so, but is betrayed anyway. Calling Ned's execution "shocking", The New York Times noted in 2011 that the novel was "famous for dispatching a thoroughly admirable major character with whom readers have been identifying for most of the book". In an interview for Entertainment Weekly, author George R. R. Martin commented on this misdirection:

I knew it almost from the beginning. Not the first day, but very soon. I've said in many interviews that I like my fiction to be unpredictable. I like there to be considerable suspense. I killed Ned in the first book and it shocked a lot of people. I killed Ned because everybody thinks he's the hero and that, sure, he's going to get into trouble, but then he'll somehow get out of it.

David Benioff, executive producer and writer of the HBO adaptation, told Entertainment Weekly that when he read the novel:

I was in shock. From your training in seeing so many movies and reading books, you know your hero is going to be saved ... Someone has something planned, because they're not really going to chop off his head—right up until the moment when they chopped off his head. I was shocked, and then admiring of George's ruthlessness. It's a tough thing to build up a character and make somebody as memorable and impressive as Ned and then get rid of him. But at the same time it leads to a story that is so much more suspenseful because you truly have no idea what is going to happen and who is going to survive.

In a review of the Game of Thrones TV episode "Baelor", James Poniewozik wrote in Time that "the execution of Eddard Stark is crucial to the story and its themes and everything that follows, but it's also a meta-message to the reader: don't take anything for granted here". James Hibberd of Entertainment Weekly stated that tricking the audience into thinking Ned is the hero and then killing him makes the series' story better. Writing that "the big twist here isn't that Ned Stark dies, but who the true protagonists of Game of Thrones are", Hibberd pointed out that the series' focus proves to be the "new generation" of leaders—in particular the Stark children as well as Daenerys Targaryen and Tyrion Lannister. He noted:

Ned Stark doesn't die in vain ... It takes the Stark kids—who are all too young to face these responsibilities—and thrusts them into a struggle where they're forced to quickly grow as characters. Martin busts many cliches in his writing, but this move is traditional Heroes [sic] Journey stuff if you consider the kids to be the true protagonists of this story—only by sacrificing the fatherly mentor figure can our heroes come into their own.

== Storylines ==
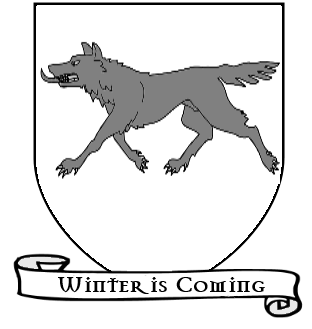
Coat of arms of House Stark

=== Background ===
As established in A Game of Thrones, Eddard "Ned" Stark is the second son of Rickard Stark, the previous Lord of Winterfell. Years before the events of the novel, the quiet and shy young Ned is fostered in the Vale of Arryn by Lord Jon Arryn. During this time, Ned becomes close friends with Robert Baratheon, heir to the Stormlands and another ward of Arryn's. Robert is eventually betrothed to Ned's sister, Lyanna Stark, but before he can marry her, Crown Prince Rhaegar Targaryen absconds with Lyanna. Ned's father and older brother, Brandon, go to "Mad King" Aerys II Targaryen and demand that Lyanna be freed, only to be both sadistically executed by him. When King Aerys demands the killing of both Ned and Robert, Lord Arryn rises in revolt along with Houses Baratheon and Stark. He secures the support of House Tully through Ned's marriage to Brandon's betrothed, Catelyn Tully. Ned leaves for war the very next morning after consummating the marriage with Catelyn.

At the decisive Battle of the Trident, the rebels scatter the Targaryen army, and Robert kills Prince Rhaegar in single combat. Robert, being injured, Ned takes over command and marches on the capital, King's Landing. Upon arrival, Ned finds that House Lannister—which has previously maintained neutrality—has already sacked the city and murdered King Aerys and the entire Targaryen royal family. Disgusted by the dishonorable massacre and Robert's tolerance thereof, Ned departs in anger to lift the siege of the Baratheon stronghold Storm's End. He later attempts to rescue Lyanna, only to find her dying in "a bed of blood"; her last words are "Promise me, Ned." Ned returns to Winterfell with an infant boy, Jon Snow, whom he claims to be his own bastard son but refuses to elaborate on the boy's maternal parentage. Meanwhile, Catelyn has delivered Ned's son and heir, Robb, conceived on their wedding night, and Ned raises Jon alongside Robb and his subsequent children.

Six years after the end of Robert's Rebellion, Balon Greyjoy, Lord of the Iron Islands, declares independence from the Iron Throne. Ned aids now-King Robert in putting down the Greyjoy Rebellion. Balon surrenders, and his sole surviving son, Theon Greyjoy, is taken back to Winterfell as Stark's ward and a de facto political hostage. Ned rules the North with justice and praise for nine more years before the events of the novel.

=== A Game of Thrones ===
At the beginning of A Game of Thrones, Ned's entourage discovers an orphaned litter of direwolf pups and he decides to allow his children to adopt them, although his men suspect the appearance of direwolves to be a bad omen of a long, harsh winter. Later, Catelyn informs Ned that his mentor Jon Arryn, who has been serving as the Hand of the King, has died suddenly of illness, and that King Robert intends to offer Ned the position of Hand. Content to be far from court intrigue, Ned is reluctant to accept the offer until he receives a letter from Arryn's widow, who believes that the Lannisters poisoned her husband. Ned agrees to the appointment to protect Robert, and travels south to King's Landing with his daughters, Sansa and Arya. Catelyn later comes to the capital in secret, under the protection of her childhood friend Petyr "Littlefinger" Baelish, to tell Ned of an assassination attempt on their now-disabled youngest son, Bran. Ned's longstanding mistrust of the Lannisters is further fueled by Littlefinger's claim that the dagger used by the would-be assassin once belonged to Tyrion Lannister. Increasingly disgusted by the political intrigues at court, Ned finally resigns his position when Robert insists on having Aerys's only surviving child, the young Daenerys Targaryen, assassinated in exile. Meanwhile, Catelyn has impulsively taken Tyrion prisoner. In retaliation, Tyrion's brother, Jaime, attacks and seriously injures Ned in the street before he and his daughters can depart King's Landing. Visiting the wounded Ned, Robert reappoints him as Hand.

Ned eventually concludes that all of Robert's heirs with his wife, Cersei Lannister, are illegitimate products of incest with her twin brother, Jaime. Further, Ned suspects that Arryn was poisoned to conceal the truth, as both Arryn and Robert's brother Stannis have been searching for Robert's other bastard children. In private, Ned confronts Cersei and offers her the chance to escape safely with her children and live in exile. Before Ned can tell the king, Robert is fatally wounded while boar hunting and names Ned as regent until his "son" Joffrey Baratheon comes of age. With the palace in chaos, Ned rebuffs multiple offers to increase his own power, instead opting to support Stannis as king. Cersei, however, outmaneuvers Ned after being informed by Sansa (who is still infatuated via her betrothal to Prince Joffrey), and the duplicitous Littlefinger betrays Ned and orders the City Watch to arrest him instead of Cersei. With all of his entourage and guards slaughtered, Ned is charged with treason. A secret deal is struck through the spymaster Varys that Ned will be spared and sent to the penal Night's Watch if he declares Joffrey the rightful king. Fearing for Sansa (who is now a hostage) and Arya (who has escaped alone and is missing), Ned makes a public confession of his "treason", but the sadistic Joffrey has Ned executed anyway for his own amusement and forces Sansa to view Ned's severed head mounted on a spike.

=== Later novels ===
In the follow-up novel A Clash of Kings, Ned's execution sparks an all-out conflict between House Stark and House Lannister, with other houses and pretenders also joining in against the crown, leading to a major civil war later called the War of the Five Kings. After Tyrion Lannister is sent to King's Landing to fix the political chaos, he returns Ned's remains to his widow, Catelyn, who then sends them North to be finally laid in House Stark's ancestral crypt. However, it is not confirmed whether they have arrived at Winterfell, as the road back to the North has been blocked by Ironborn invaders. Lady Barbrey Dustin of Barrowton, who holds past grudges against Ned, later claims that she will personally never allow Ned's bones to be returned and laid to rest in Winterfell's crypt if they are found on her fief.

Ned is mentioned in a flashback along with his friend Robert Baratheon and also repeatedly by other characters in the subsequent novels A Storm of Swords and A Dance with Dragons, including the surviving Stark children (who all remember him fondly); Stannis Baratheon and Jorah Mormont (who both affirm respect to his honor); House Manderly; and numerous members of the Northern mountain clans who all continue to hold great love to his name. The mountain clan members, in particular, only join Stannis's march on the House Bolton-controlled Winterfell in honor of Ned's legacy.

In A Feast for Crows, when Queen Dowager Cersei is sentenced to the walk of atonement by the nascent leadership of the Faith of the Seven, she is frequently haunted by the imaginary vision of Ned silently mocking her in the crowd.

=== Family tree of House Stark ===
Descendants of Rickard Stark

Rickard	Lyarra
Brandon	Catelyn; Tully	Eddard	Lyanna (Note: In season 7 of the TV series Game of Thrones, Jon is revealed to be the son of Rhaegar Targaryen and Lyanna.)	Benjen
Robb	Jeyne; Westerling	Sansa	Tyrion; Lannister	Arya	Brandon	Rickon	Jon; Snow

== TV adaptation ==
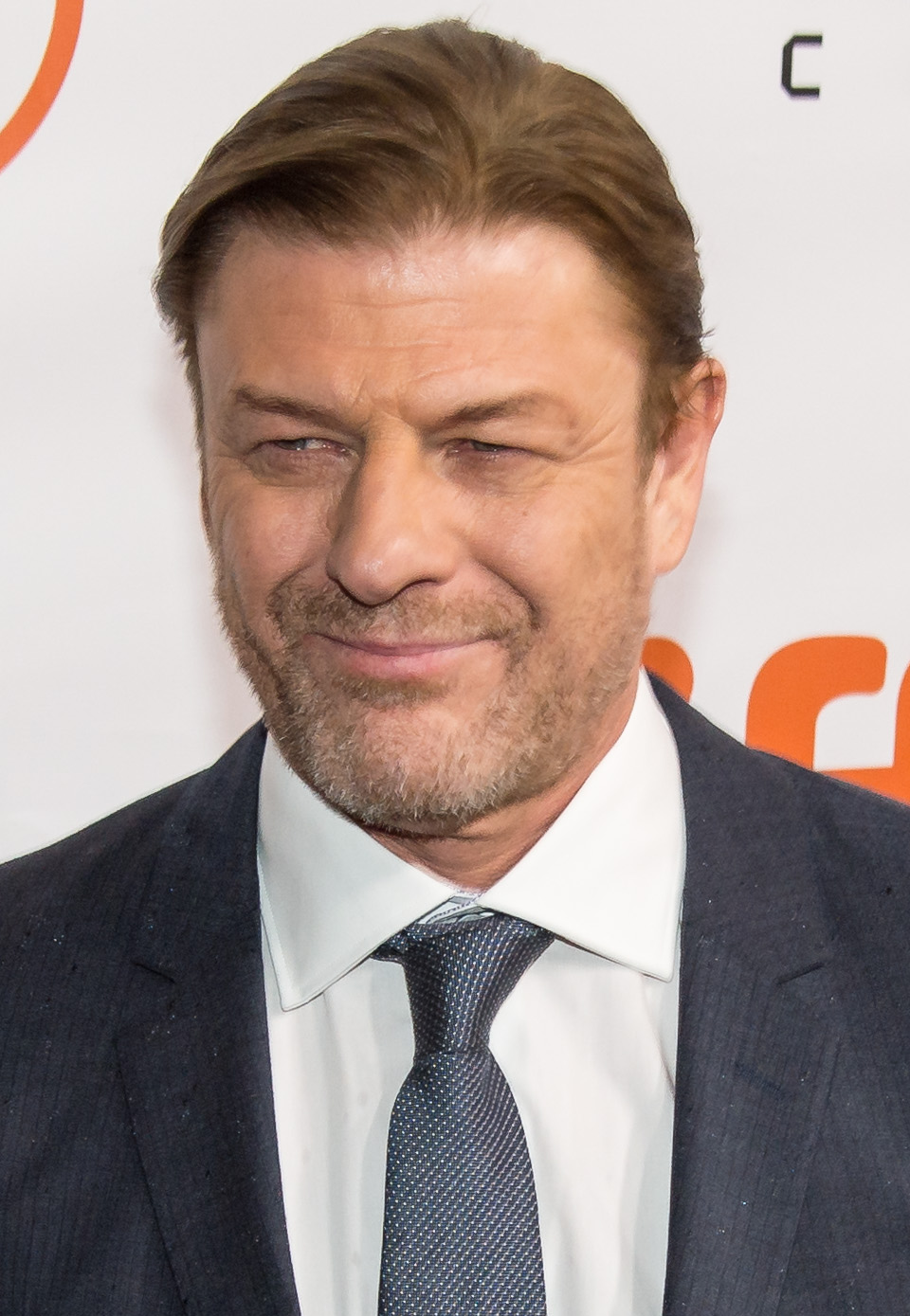
Sean Bean played Ned Stark in the television series.

In January 2007, HBO secured the rights to adapt Martin's series for television. When the pilot went into production in 2009, one of the first casting announcements was Sean Bean as the "lead" Eddard Stark. As the show premiered in 2011, the Los Angeles Times called Bean's Ned "the strong and brooding headliner of the series".

As in the source novel, Ned is beheaded in the ninth episode of season 1, "Baelor". Although praising the character's demise for its role in propelling the story, James Hibberd of Entertainment Weekly later noted that:

This is probably the first time a U.S. drama series has ever killed off its main character in the first season as part of its master creative plan … it's just … not done. You don't cast a star, put him on bus stops and magazine ads marketing the show, get viewers all invested in his story, and then dump him nine episodes later just because it arguably makes the story a bit more interesting.

Hibberd echoed the show's producers' statement that "the move lays down a dramatic precedent for the show: Nobody is safe". He called it a "risky" move that would probably lose the show viewers who had tuned in for Bean, but would hopefully attract others impressed by the boldness of it. Executive producer and writer D. B. Weiss told Entertainment Weekly in 2011 that when he and Benioff pitched the series to HBO, the fact that "main character" (i.e., Ned) was slated to die "was a selling point for them". Noting that the network had killed off characters in other successful series, he said that this sense of jeopardy "completely ups the ante for any moment when a character is in a dire situation if you know another character didn't survive a similar situation". HBO programming president Sue Naegle concurred, saying that Ned's death made the show creatively more attractive, adding that "The book series was filled with unexpected twists and turns. I loved this idea we'd bring together the group of characters, then once you started to believe all the tropes of heroes, you pull the rug out from under them. It's the opposite of feeling manipulated". Noting that the story and world of the series is bigger than any one character, Naegle said, "Sean brings a giant following, but Thrones is not just about the promise you're going to see one of your favorite actors week in and week out. The star is the story". Bean noted that Ned's death "was as much a surprise to me as anyone" and called it "a very courageous move for a television company".

The image of Bean as Ned Stark sitting on the Iron Throne is featured on the covers of the 2011 season 1 DVD and Blu-ray disc sets, released in March 2012.

The character returns in the sixth season in a recurring capacity via flashback visions of his youth and childhood seen by Bran Stark and the Three-eyed Raven using greensight.

=== Storylines ===
==== Season 1 ====
In season 1, King Robert Baratheon travels to Winterfell and asks his old friend and closest ally Eddard "Ned" Stark, Lord of Winterfell and Warden of the North, to assume the position of Hand of the King after the sudden death of their mentor, Jon Arryn. Not interested in politics or the intrigues of the royal court, Ned accepts the post out of duty, as well as to discover how Arryn died. Ned travels to King's Landing with his daughters, Arya and Sansa, the latter of whom is betrothed to Robert's eldest (supposed) son, Prince Joffrey Baratheon. Meanwhile, Ned's wife, Catelyn (née Tully), has Tyrion Lannister captured, believing he was responsible for sending an assassin to kill the couple's son Bran and that the Lannisters also killed Jon Arryn. Ned and Robert soon find themselves at odds regarding the Crown's handling of Daenerys Targaryen, and Ned steps down as Hand in defiance of Robert's wishes to have her killed. Soon after, Ned and his guards are attacked by Tyrion's brother, Jaime Lannister; Ned is injured, and his men are murdered. Robert reappoints Ned as Hand and commands him to have Catelyn release Tyrion and make peace with the Lannisters. While Robert departs for a boar hunt, Ned discovers that Tywin Lannister and his forces are laying siege to the Riverlands, the homeland of his wife's house, the Tullys. He demands Tywin present himself in King's Landing and sends a force to bring his bannermen to justice.

Robert is killed just as Ned discovers that his three children by Cersei Lannister were actually fathered by the queen's twin, Jaime. Before Ned is able to neutralize Cersei and place Robert's brother Stannis on the throne, he is betrayed by Littlefinger, and the queen has him imprisoned for treason. Ned's eldest son, Robb, calls in his father's banners and marches an army south in an attempt to rescue his father. Ned makes a public confession to save his daughters from Cersei's wrath, but Joffrey has Ned beheaded anyway.

==== Seasons 6 and 7 ====
In the season 6 episode "Home", Bran sees a vision of Ned (Sebastian Croft) as a child with his sister and brother, Lyanna and Benjen, respectively. In the following episode, "Oathbreaker", Bran witnesses the battle between a young Ned (Robert Aramayo) and the knight Ser Arthur Dayne at the Tower of Joy. In the episode "The Door", Bran watches Ned bid Benjen and his father, Rickard, farewell as he departs for his fosterage at the Vale. In the following episode, "Blood of My Blood", Bran briefly glimpses Ned's hand amongst someone's blood, revealed in the season finale, "The Winds of Winter", as belonging to Lyanna (Aisling Franciosi), who dies in childbirth in the tower. She makes him swear to protect her son, Jon Snow. Bran revisits this moment in the season 7 finale, "The Dragon and the Wolf", in which Lyanna whispers Jon's true name to Ned: Aegon Targaryen.

=== Recognition and awards ===
Bean was nominated for a Saturn Award for Best Actor on Television, a Scream Award for Best Fantasy Actor, and an EWwy Award for Best Actor, Drama, for the role. IGN named Ned its Best TV Hero of 2011, and Bean won the Portal Award for Best Actor.
