= Robert Baratheon =

Character in A Song of Ice and Fire series

- A Song of Ice and Fire character Game of Thrones character
- Mark Addy as Robert Baratheon in Game of Thrones
- First appearance: Literature: A Game of Thrones (1996); Television: "Winter Is Coming" (2011)
- Last appearance: Literature: A Clash of Kings (1998); Television: "You Win or You Die" (2011)
- Created by: George R. R. Martin
- Based on: Edward IV
- Adapted by: D. B. Weiss & David Benioff (Game of Thrones)
- Portrayed by: Mark Addy

In-universe information
- Alias: The Usurper The Whoremonger King
- Gender: Male
- Titles: King of the Andals, the Rhoynar and the First Men; Lord of the Seven Kingdoms; Protector of the Realm; Lord of Storm's End; Lord Paramount of the Stormlands
- Occupation: King; War general and revolutionary figure
- Family: House Baratheon
- Spouse: Cersei Lannister
- Children: Mya Stone; Bella; Gendry; Edric Storm; Barra; Several others (with various women); Joffrey Baratheon (legal son); Myrcella Baratheon (legal daughter); Tommen Baratheon (legal son); Television: Unnamed infant son with Cersei
- Relatives: Steffon Baratheon (father); Cassana Estermont (mother); Stannis Baratheon (brother); Renly Baratheon (brother); Shireen Baratheon (niece); Lord Estermont (grandfather)

Robert Baratheon is a fictional character in the A Song of Ice and Fire series of epic fantasy novels by American author George R. R. Martin and its television adaptation, Game of Thrones, in which he is portrayed by English actor Mark Addy.

Introduced in 1996's A Game of Thrones, Robert is the eldest son and heir of Lord Steffon Baratheon. He is a close friend to Eddard "Ned" Stark, and both of them were wards of Lord Jon Arryn as boys. After his betrothed, Lyanna Stark, was allegedly kidnapped by Prince Rhaegar Targaryen, and Eddard's father and brother were murdered by Rhaegar's father, "Mad King" Aerys II Targaryen, Robert, Ned, and Jon started a rebellion. After crushing the Targaryen dynasty and winning the war, during which Lyanna died, Robert took the Iron Throne. He married Tywin Lannister's daughter, Cersei Lannister, to secure political stability. Although Robert's reign is fairly peaceful, he proves to be an ineffective ruler. He is unhappy in his marriage to Cersei, whom he mistreats, and in his duties as king, living a life of infidelity and reckless excess. He fathers many illegitimate children and remains unaware that his three children with Cersei were actually fathered by her twin brother, Jaime Lannister, from incest.

Although Robert dies in the first novel, the legacy of his rebellion and reign continues to have a significant impact on contemporary events in Westeros. His death creates a power vacuum in which his brothers and Cersei's eldest son, Joffrey Baratheon, fight for control of the Seven Kingdoms while Robb Stark and Balon Greyjoy fight for secession, known as the War of Five Kings.

According to Martin, Robert is based on the 15th-century English king Edward IV.

== Character background ==
Robert Baratheon is the eldest son and heir of Lord Steffon Baratheon and Lady Cassana Estermont and has two younger brothers: Stannis and Renly Baratheon. Through his paternal grandmother, Rhaelle Targaryen, Robert is a first cousin once removed to King Aerys II of House Targaryen, the ruling monarch of Seven Kingdoms of Westeros preceding Robert's own reign, as well as a second cousin to Rhaegar, Viserys III, and Daenerys Targaryen.

In his youth, Robert was sent to the Vale of Arryn (also known as "the Vale") and raised at the Eyrie as the ward of Lord Jon Arryn alongside Eddard "Ned" Stark, to whom he became a lifelong friend—he was closer to Ned than to his brothers. When Robert was 16, his parents drowned in a maritime incident while returning from an overseas trip, and he became the lord of Storm's End. He was later betrothed to Ned's younger sister, Lyanna Stark, with whom he was madly—and unrequitedly—in love. After Lyanna's disappearance with Rhaegar Targaryen and the sadistic summary execution of Ned's father, Lord Rickard Stark, and elder brother, Brandon, respectively, King Aerys II demanded that Jon Arryn surrender the heads of Robert and Ned. Jon Arryn refused and instead rebelled in alliance with Houses Baratheon, Stark, and Tully (which was then in a marriage alliance with the Starks). The rebellion, which involved four of the Seven Kingdoms and was known as "Robert's Rebellion" because of Robert's claim to the throne through his quarter-Targaryen lineage, led to the fall of the Targaryen dynasty. Robert killed Rhaegar in single combat. Lyanna died during childbirth on the same day. Robert later married Cersei Lannister to secure House Lannister's support for his rule.

=== Personality and description ===
Robert is in his mid-30s when the events of the books begin. Although being a quarter-Targaryen, Robert has the classical Baratheon look: black hair and bright blue eyes, with dense black body hair on his chest and around his manhood. He is a very tall man, with Eddard estimating his height to be six and a half feet (2.0 m). As a young adult, Robert was handsome, clean-shaven, strong, and muscled "like a maiden's fantasy". However, after winning the Iron Throne, Robert became very obese due to excessive feasting and drinking—gaining at least eight stone (51 kg) in weight—and turned into a frequently red-faced man with dark circles under his eyes. He often appears half-drunk and sweating while walking, with a wild, thick, fierce beard that conceals his double chin.

In his youth, Robert was a warrior with a powerful voice, wielding a large spiked iron war hammer too heavy for Ned to lift, and was well loved by soldiers. Although deconditioned after becoming king due to weight gain and frequent drinking, Jaime Lannister still believes Robert is stronger than he is.

Robert is a jovial man with a huge appetite and knows how to indulge in pleasures. He is very promiscuous, having fathered multiple illegitimate children—16, according to the prophecy by Lannisport fortuneteller Maggy the Frog—with whores or simply any attractive woman he encounters, and his lusts are the subject of ribald drinking songs throughout the realms. As king, Robert is known to impose upon the hospitality—voluntarily or otherwise—of his subjects, but at the same time also possesses a rather careless generosity. A proud man, Robert rarely backs down on words spoken in a drunken rant. As king, Robert is no longer used to anyone disagreeing with him, which makes him vulnerable to manipulation by others. Robert loathes his responsibilities as king and frequently expresses his preference for winning the throne in battle rather than sitting on it. He has never truly loved his wife, Cersei, or cared for any of his children, legitimate or bastard. Under his reign, the realm has been bankrupted by his lavish overspending, and Robert is deeply in debt to House Lannister, the Faith, and the Iron Bank of Braavos. Tyrion Lannister considers Robert to be "a great, blustering oaf", while Varys describes him as a fool. His queen wife, Cersei Lannister, considers him to be an ignorant, dumb, slow-witted, drunken brute who does not have the ruthless streak she believes a king requires, and has therefore secretly cheated on Robert and incestuously conceived three illegitimate children (who are passed as Robert's legitimate heirs) with her twin brother, Jaime. According to Petyr Baelish, Robert is practised at closing his eyes to things he would rather not see.

== Storylines ==
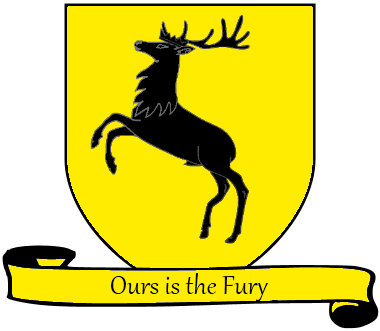
Coat of arms of House Baratheon

Robert Baratheon is not a point-of-view character in the novels, so his actions are mainly witnessed and interpreted through the eyes of Ned Stark. He appears only in the first book of the series A Game of Thrones, though he is mentioned numerous times in the later books by characters such as Cersei Lannister.

=== A Game of Thrones ===
King Robert has come to Winterfell to appoint his close friend Eddard Stark as the Hand of the King after the untimely death of Jon Arryn. He was unaware that Cersei's three children were incestuously fathered by her twin brother, Jaime Lannister. More interested in food, drink, and tourneys than in governance, Robert has squandered the royal treasury, leaving the Crown heavily in debt. After a hunting accident orchestrated by Cersei, Robert is mortally wounded by a wild boar and appoints Eddard as the regent for his son Joffrey Baratheon. After Robert's death, Eddard loses the political struggle against the Lannisters and is later publicly executed by beheading. The kingdom plunges into a civil war known as the War of the Five Kings (which encompasses the entirety of the following two books), in which Robert's two brothers, Renly and Stannis Baratheon, both declare themselves the rightful kings. Eddard's vengeful son Robb, and later, Balon Greyjoy, also secede and declare kingships.

=== Family tree of House Baratheon ===
Family tree of House Baratheon

Ormund	Rhaelle; Targaryen
Steffon	Cassana; Estermont
Delena; Florent	Robert; 283–298	Cersei; Lannister	Jaime; Lannister	Stannis	Selyse; Florent	Renly	Margaery; Tyrell (Note: Margaery Tyrell first married Renly, then Joffrey, and then Tommen.)
Edric; Storm	Gendry	Bella	Myrcella (Note: Joffrey, Myrcella and Tommen, although recognized by Robert, are secretly the illegitimate children of Jaime Lannister.)	Shireen
Mya; Stone	Barra	11 others	Joffrey; 298–300	Margaery; Tyrell	Tommen; 300–

== TV adaptation ==
Mark Addy plays Robert Baratheon in the television adaptation of the book series. According to showrunners David Benioff and D. B. Weiss, Addy's audition for the role was the best they had seen, and he was the easiest actor to cast for the show. Brian Cox said he turned down the role because the "money was not all that great" and the character would be killed off early in the series.

=== Season 1 ===
Robert's storyline is the same in the show as it is in the novels. However, his wife, Cersei Lannister, reveals that she had a stillborn son with him, which is not the case in the novels, wherein Cersei uses guile and trickery to prevent him from ever actually engaging in sexual intercourse with her while drunk.

=== Season 2 ===
After his death, Robert's bastards are ordered killed by his heir, Joffrey Baratheon, Robert's supposed legal heir and the new king; Gendry, one of Robert's bastards, subsequently flees the capital.

=== Seasons 6 & 7 ===
In seasons six and seven, Bran Stark's gift of vision as the Three-Eyed Raven reveals to him the truth of Rhaegar and Lyanna's relationship: that Lyanna willingly fled with Rhaegar and married him in secret, and states that "Robert's Rebellion was built on a lie".

=== Season 8 ===
Following the Night King's defeat and the destruction of the White Walkers and the army of the dead, Daenerys Targaryen legitimizes Gendry as Gendry Baratheon, naming him Robert's lawful son and the new Lord of Storm's End.
