= Walk of shame =

Walk that solicits embarrassment

A walk of shame is a situation in which a person must walk past strangers or peers alone for an embarrassing reason before reaching a place of safety and privacy.

== In sports ==
In sports in which a player can be ejected from the match (such as penalty cards, disqualifying fouls, et al), their passage off the pitch is frequently referred to as a walk of shame, especially in instances where the player looks more remorseful than angry. This is generally amplified, especially in association football (soccer), as the opposing team's supporters generally feel few inhibitions at barracking the player with abuse as they leave. A similar term is used on the BBC game show The Weakest Link, where regardless of the country it aired, the host would send off the contestant, and the contestant would walk off the stage in a similar manner.

== Returning from a one-night stand ==
It is also often used to describe the morning after a night out at a bar, nightclub, or party. People undertaking the walk of shame are understood to have spent the night at the residence of a sexual partner (or perceived sexual partner), particularly a one-night stand. The topic is often the subject of college newspaper commentary. The "walker" may often be identified by their disheveled appearance and incongruous evening attire, particularly on Saturday or Sunday mornings.

== In exhibitionism ==
In exhibitionism, the walk of shame may also refer to an exhibitionist walking in public while exposed—either partially or fully naked—and trying to reach a place of safety and privacy.

== See also ==
- Perp walk
- Penalty card
- Ejection (sports)
- Walk of Shame, a 2014 film
