= Power struggle =

Situation where multiple people seek dominance

A power struggle is situation where two or more people or groups fight to gain dominance over each other. The term is most commonly used in a political context, when parties contend for power or leadership positions, wherein the winner seems unclear.

== See also ==
- Coup d'état
- Insurrection
- Power vacuum
- Provisional government
