= Jaime Lannister =

Fictional character in A Song of Ice and Fire novels

- A Song of Ice and Fire character Game of Thrones character
- Nikolaj Coster-Waldau as Jaime Lannister in Game of Thrones
- First appearance: Literature: A Game of Thrones (1996); Television: "Winter Is Coming" (2011)
- Last appearance: Television: "The Iron Throne" (2019)
- Created by: George R. R. Martin
- Adapted by: David Benioff; D. B. Weiss (Game of Thrones)
- Portrayed by: Nikolaj Coster-Waldau
- Voiced by: J. P. Karliak (Game of Thrones: Kingsroad)

In-universe information
- Aliases: The Kingslayer; The Young Lion
- Titles: Ser; Lord Commander of the Kingsguard
- Occupation: Warrior
- Family: House Lannister
- Significant others: Cersei Lannister; Television: Brienne of Tarth
- Children: With Cersei: Joffrey Baratheon; Myrcella Baratheon; Tommen Baratheon
- Relatives: Tywin Lannister (father); Joanna Lannister (mother); Cersei Lannister (twin sister); Tyrion Lannister (brother); Kevan Lannister (uncle); Lancel Lannister (cousin)

Ser Jaime Lannister is a fictional character in the A Song of Ice and Fire series of fantasy novels by American author George R. R. Martin and its television adaptation Game of Thrones, where he is portrayed by Danish actor Nikolaj Coster-Waldau. Jaime becomes a prominent point of view character in the novels beginning with the third volume, A Storm of Swords (2000).

Introduced in A Game of Thrones (1996), Jaime is a knight of the Kingsguard and one of the best swordsmen in the Seven Kingdoms. He is a member of House Lannister, the wealthiest and one of the most powerful families in Westeros. He is the elder son of Tywin Lannister, twin brother of Cersei, with whom he has a longstanding incestuous relationship, and brother of Tyrion. Although Jaime first appears unscrupulous, immoral and highly cynical, he later proves to be more complex, honorable, and sympathetic. His lengthy character development has been praised by critics of the novels and the television show.

Jaime is one of the most popular characters in both the novels and the television series. Coster-Waldau received critical praise for his portrayal and several award nominations, including a Saturn Award for Best Supporting Actor on Television, a Critics' Choice Television Award for Best Supporting Actor in a Drama Series, People's Choice Awards Favorite TV Anti-Hero, and two Primetime Emmy Award for Outstanding Supporting Actor in a Drama Series nominations. He and the rest of the cast were nominated for five Screen Actors Guild Awards for Outstanding Performance by an Ensemble in a Drama Series.

== Character description ==
In A Game of Thrones (1996), Ser Jaime is introduced as one of the Kingsguard, the royal security detail, the son of the wealthy and powerful Tywin Lannister (the former Hand of the King), and one of the greatest swordsmen in the Seven Kingdoms with few able to match him, such as Barristan Selmy, Garlan Tyrell, and Loras Tyrell. Jaime's twin is Cersei, the Queen of Westeros by her marriage to King Robert Baratheon. Jaime is derisively referred to as "the Kingslayer" because he killed the "Mad King" Aerys Targaryen in the coup that put Robert on the Iron Throne.

Eric Dodds of Time described Jaime as "handsome, an incomparably skilled fighter, and disarmingly witty". The New Yorker called the Lannisters "a crowd of high-cheekboned beauties ... who form a family constellation so twisted, charismatic, and cruel that it rivals Flowers in the Attic for blond dysfunction". Lev Grossman wrote for TIME that while Jaime and Cersei's younger brother Tyrion is a grotesque dwarf, "the rest of the Lannisters are stunted too, but on the inside." The Los Angeles Times called Jaime "handsome and unscrupulous", though Dodds noted in 2014:

Sure, he's done some of the most despicable things on a show full of despicable things—including but not limited to fathering children by incest, attempting to murder a boy who discovered said incest, and the cold-blooded murder of one of his own cousins—but despite all that, the Kingslayer remains one of Game of Thrones' most popular characters.

Darren Franich of Entertainment Weekly noted that in the novels, "[Jaime is] a vaguely villainous minor character in Game of Thrones, then is basically absent from Clash of Kings, and suddenly he becomes a tragic hero in Storm of Swords." In A Game of Thrones, Jaime is not only carrying on an incestuous affair with his twin sister, but he pushes a young Bran Stark out a high window to his likely death after the boy witnesses them in the act. Jaime admits these crimes to Catelyn Stark in A Clash of Kings (1998) and tells her a horrific story of Aerys Targaryen's cruelty. In A Storm of Swords (2000), Jaime initially loathes the female warrior Brienne of Tarth, but both his honor and his reluctant respect for Brienne compel him to lie to their captors to prevent her from being raped. He later explains to Brienne that he killed Aerys because the king had planned to incinerate all of King's Landing and its inhabitants rather than let it fall into Robert's hands. When Jaime is released to be sent back to King's Landing in deference to his father, he first saves Brienne, who has been thrown into a bear pit for the mercenaries' amusement. Martin told Rolling Stone in 2014:

One of the things I wanted to explore with Jaime, and with so many of the characters, is the whole issue of redemption. When can we be redeemed? Is redemption even possible? ... When do we forgive people? ... Our society is full of people who have fallen in one way or another ... How many good acts make up for a bad act? ... I don't know the answer, but these are questions worth thinking about. I want there to be a possibility of redemption for us, because we all do terrible things. We should be able to be forgiven. Because if there is no possibility of redemption, what's the answer then?

Specifically addressing Jaime's attempted murder of Bran, Martin said:

[What] Jaime did [to Bran] is interesting ... Remember, Jaime isn't just trying to kill Bran because he's an annoying little kid. Bran has seen something that is basically a death sentence for Jaime, for Cersei, and their children ... So I've asked people who do have children, "Well, what would you do in Jaime's situation?" They say, "Well, I'm not a bad guy—I wouldn't kill." Are you sure? Never? If Bran tells King Robert, he's going to kill you and your sister-lover, and your three children ... Then many of them hesitate. Probably more people than not would say, "Yeah, I would kill someone else's child to save my own child, even if that other child was innocent." These are the difficult decisions people make, and they're worth examining.

Jaime's later chapters in the books give an explanation for his pessimistic and dismissive views of honor. Jaime often recounts his childhood idolization of great knights and members of the Kingsguard such as Ser Arthur Dayne and Barristan Selmy and how he sought to achieve the honor and courage of these men. In A Feast for Crows, he reminisces on the day Dayne knighted him, describing it as the birth of the Young Lion he would become. These idyllic perceptions of Westeros's noble lords and knights would soon sour as Jaime began to grow up. Soon after, Jaime became the youngest member of Aerys II's Kingsguard during the tourney at Harrenhal. This appointment was not made for his skill or honor, but rather was a political move by Aerys to deny Jaime's father, Tywin, his heir and humiliate his house. Regardless, Jaime embraced the honor and used it to remain close to his sister and lover, Cersei. The major turning point of Jaime's mindset came when he betrayed King Aerys II to save King's Landing. Condemned as an oathbreaker and Kingslayer for his act of heroism, Jaime began to shun the notion of honor. In A Clash of Kings, Jaime reflects on this action and the weight of his vows, seeing his adherence to knightly values, such as protecting the innocent, as forsaking his other vows like protecting the King. He places the blame of his actions on these codes and vows, contradictory in nature, that force him to choose between one evil or another. Similar to his brother Tyrion using his disability as a shield, Jaime also hid behind his title of “Kingslayer,” as he made mockery of the values of honor that ostracized him. While Tyrion's disability was physical, Jaime too sees himself as disabled, haunted by divine punishment for the wrongs of his life. Exemplified by his shining golden armor, a contrast to the traditional white uniforms of the Kingsguard, Jaime hid his disillusionment behind arrogance and sarcasm. In A Storm of Swords, Jaime recounts how he had once striven to be an honorable knight like Ser Arthur Dayne but instead views himself as the more twisted and cynical Smiling Knight.

After losing his hand to defend Brienne of Tarth, Jaime again has his world-view transformed. No longer able to rely on his swordsmanship to substantiate his knightly appearance, Jaime begins to re-explore his meaning of honor and redeem himself in his own eyes. Saving Brienne and entrusting her to protect Catelyn Stark's children with his Valyrian steel sword “Oathkeeper,” serve as quiet acts of redemption that push him closer to the honorable knight image he once strived to attain. In A Feast for Crows, he refuses his sister when she asks him to champion her in a trial by combat, marking a separation of his new self from his old. Jaime's complexity throughout the books paint him less as a villain and more as a misunderstood hero.

== Storylines ==
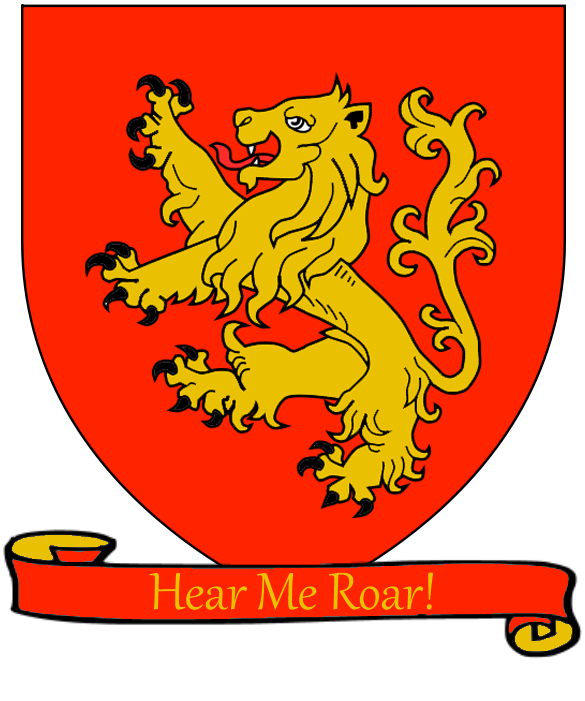
Coat of arms of House Lannister

=== A Game of Thrones ===
Jaime Lannister accompanies the royal family to Winterfell, wherein King Robert Baratheon hopes to persuade his old friend Ned Stark to serve as his Hand of the King. During the visit, Ned's young son Bran inadvertently observes Jaime and his twin sister, Queen Cersei Lannister, having sex in a remote tower, at which point Jaime pushes the boy out of a window, intending to kill Bran to keep their relationship secret. Bran survives, though paralyzed from his waist down and with no recollection of the incident. When an assassin later tries to kill Bran, his mother, Lady Catelyn Stark, accuses and arrests Tyrion, believing him the culprit. In revenge, Jaime instigates a brawl with Ned and his men in the streets of King's Landing, killing many on both sides, including Jory Cassel, the captain of Ned's household guards. Ned later discovers that Robert's three children are the products of Jaime and Cersei's affair, but the oldest, Joffrey Baratheon, executes him upon his ascension to the throne. Jaime then rides for the Riverlands to aid his father, Tywin Lannister, in his campaign against the Riverlands, taking command of half the Lannister host. He besieges the Riverlands' capital of Riverrun, but Robb Stark's army waylays his army in the Battle of the Whispering Wood. Jaime is taken prisoner and incarcerated in Riverrun. In the meantime, Joffrey has named Jaime as commander of his Kingsguard.

Hillary Busis of Entertainment Weekly called the twist of Jaime and Cersei in the tower "lurid and shocking, exactly what I needed to jolt me awake and make me start paying closer attention ... By the end of the chapter — 'The things I do for love' — I was totally hooked on Thrones". Mikal Gilmore of Rolling Stone noted in 2014 that the moment in which Jaime pushes Bran to his likely death "grabs you by the throat". Martin commented in the interview:

I've had a million people tell me that was the moment that hooked them, where they said, "Well, this is just not the same story I read a million times before."

=== A Clash of Kings ===
Tyrion makes several attempts to free Jaime, first by having disguised Lannister guards attempt to break him out and then by offering to swap Arya Stark and Sansa Stark for Jaime. After hearing of the supposed deaths of Bran and Rickon Stark, Catelyn interrogates Jaime. Jaime admits to pushing Bran out the tower window, to his incest with Cersei, and to fathering her children. Jaime then mocks Ned for having tarnished his own honour by fathering a bastard, prompting Catelyn to call her bodyguard Brienne of Tarth for her sword.

=== A Storm of Swords ===
Jaime is freed by Catelyn and sent to King's Landing in exchange for Sansa and Arya, escorted by Brienne of Tarth and Jaime's cousin Ser Cleos Frey. Cleos is killed by bandits, and Jaime and Brienne are captured by the Brave Companions, who were formerly in service to Tywin but have defected to Roose Bolton. Their leader, Vargo Hoat, cuts off Jaime's sword hand in the hope that Tywin will blame Roose and prevent the Boltons from defecting to the Lannisters. While held captive at Harrenhal, Jaime reveals to Brienne the circumstances surrounding his murder of King Aerys II Targaryen. Roose Bolton releases Jaime but keeps Brienne hostage. While returning to King's Landing, Jaime has a dream about Brienne and decides to return to Harrenhal to rescue her from Hoat.

Continuing on to King's Landing, Jaime and Brienne learn that Robb and Catelyn have been murdered at the Red Wedding, and that Joffrey has been poisoned, with Tyrion on trial for the murder; Jaime refuses to believe Tyrion is guilty. Tywin gifts Jaime with a Valyrian steel sword forged from House Stark's ancestral sword Ice and reveals that he plans to have Jaime released from his vows to the Kingsguard, disowning him when Jaime declines. Jaime passes the sword on to Brienne and tasks her with finding and protecting the fugitive Sansa Stark. He then forces Varys into helping Tyrion escape, confessing to Tyrion that he owed him a debt for his role in Tysha's fate. Outraged, Tyrion spitefully reveals to Jaime Cersei's affairs during his imprisonment, swears vengeance on Jaime and the rest of House Lannister, and lies that he did indeed kill Joffrey, before killing Tywin.

=== A Feast for Crows ===
Jaime and Cersei's relationship breaks down after he repeatedly declines her requests to become the new Hand of the King, and he becomes more disturbed by Cersei's arrogance and impulsive leadership. Jaime tries to reconcile Kevan and Cersei, in hopes that Kevan will take the role of Hand. Kevan rebuffs Jaime's efforts, and implies that he knows of Jaime and Cersei's incestuous relationship. Cersei orders Jaime to go to Riverrun and dislodge Ser Brynden "Blackfish" Tully. Before he leaves, Jaime has an armorer forge him a prosthetic hand. He takes the King's Justice, Ser Ilyn Payne, with him to teach him to fight with his left hand, using the lessons to confess to his numerous crimes. During the march, he encounters his cousin Lancel, who confesses to his affair with Cersei. Jaime persuades Edmure Tully to force the Blackfish's surrender by threatening to sack the castle and kill Edmure's child when it is born, though Edmure assists the Blackfish in escaping. Jaime later receives a letter from Cersei, who has been imprisoned by the High Sparrow and is awaiting trial. She begs Jaime to be her champion in the trial by combat, but Jaime burns the letter without replying.

=== A Dance with Dragons ===
Jaime travels to Raventree Hall and negotiates Lord Tytos Blackwood's surrender, officially ending House Stark's insurrection. In the aftermath, he is approached by Brienne, who claims that Sansa is in danger from Sandor "the Hound" Clegane. This is untrue, as Brienne has been forced by Lady Stoneheart, the reanimated corpse of Catelyn Stark, to bring Jaime to her to punish him for his family's role in the Red Wedding.

=== Family tree of House Lannister ===
Descendants of Tytos Lannister

Tytos	Jeyne; Marbrand
Joanna	Tywin	Emmon; Frey	Genna	Kevan	Dorna; Swyft	Tygett	Darlessa; Marbrand	Gerion	Briony
Robert; Baratheon	Cersei	Jaime	Tysha (Note: Tyrion's first wife was a peasant girl named Tysha. The marriage was later annulled by Lord Tywin's order.)	Tyrion	Sansa; Stark	Amerei; Frey	Lancel	Martyn	Willem	Janei	Tyrek	Ermesande; Hayford	Joy; Hill
Joffrey; Baratheon (Note: Though officially Robert's children, Joffrey, Myrcella and Tommen are the products of an incestuous affair between Cersei and Jaime.)	Myrcella; Baratheon	Margaery; Tyrell	Tommen; Baratheon	Tion; Frey	"Red" Walder; Frey	Jeyne; Darry	Cleos; Frey	Lyonel; Frey	Melesa Crakehall
Tywin; Frey	Willem; Frey

References and notes:

== TV adaptation ==
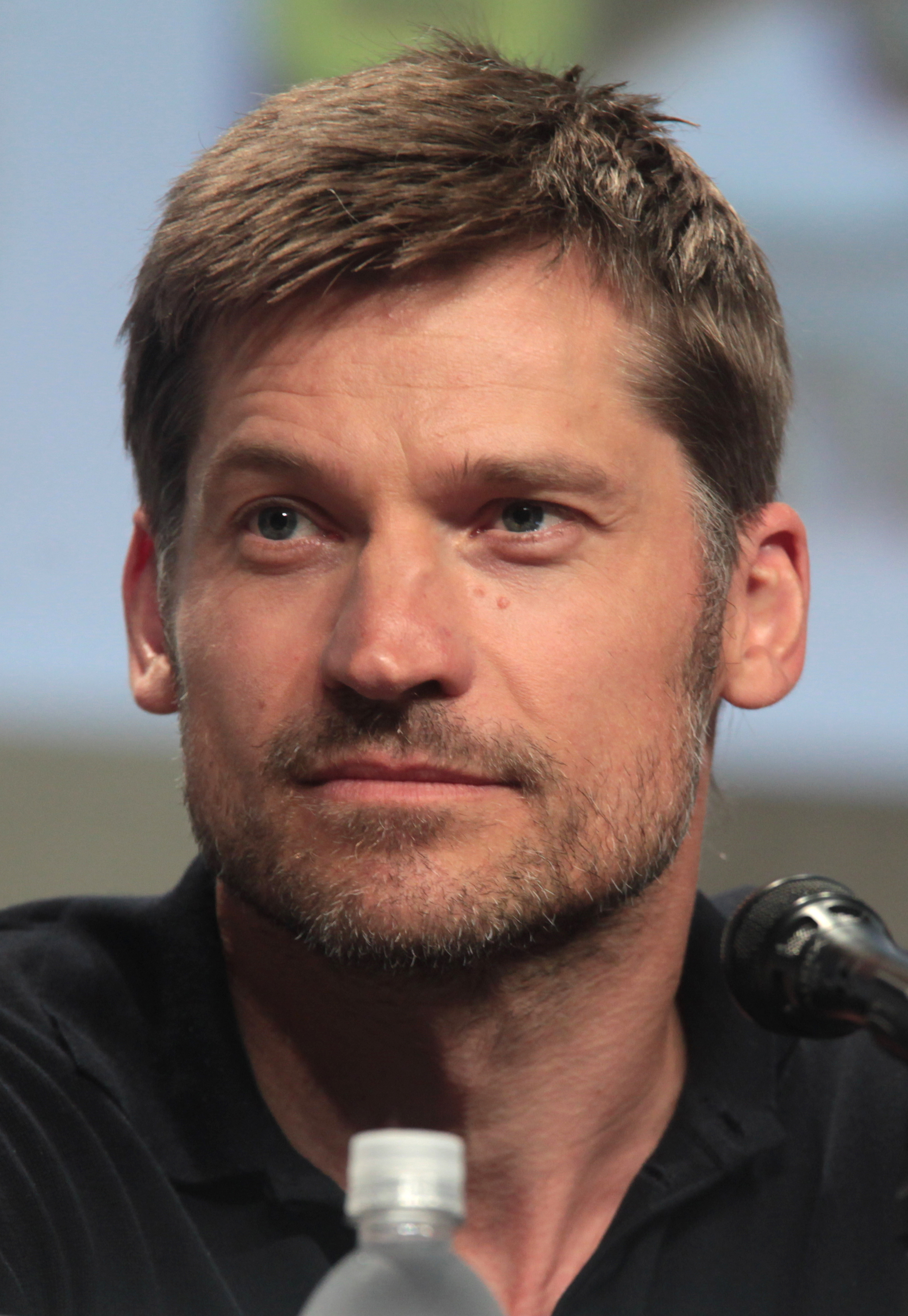
Nikolaj Coster-Waldau plays the role of Jaime Lannister in the television series.

Jaime is portrayed by Danish actor Nikolaj Coster-Waldau in the HBO adaptation of the books, Game of Thrones. His casting was announced on August 20, 2009.

In October 2014, Coster-Waldau and several other key cast members, all contracted for six seasons of the series, renegotiated their deals to include a potential seventh season and salary increases for seasons five, six, and seven. The Hollywood Reporter called the raises "huge", noting that the deal would make the performers "among the highest-paid actors on cable TV". Deadline Hollywood put the number for season five at "close to $300,000 (equivalent to $407,998 in 2025) an episode" for each actor, and The Hollywood Reporter wrote in June 2016 that the performers would each be paid "upward of $500,000 (equivalent to $670,757 in 2025) per episode for seasons seven and the potential eight. In 2017, he became one of the highest paid actors on television and earned £2 million (equivalent to £2.7 million or US$3.5 million in 2025) per episode for the show.

Matt Fowler of IGN noted in 2013 that "the people who do seem to get redemption arcs on this show are the villains". Over the course of the first three seasons, the series transitioned Jaime from an obvious villain to an antihero of sorts. Eric Dodds of Time wrote that Jaime had become "a complex, bizarrely likable character". Andrew Romano of The Daily Beast explained:

But Jaime wasn't a black-and-white baddie for long. In fact, GoT spent the next three seasons transforming him into a pretty sympathetic character. The turning point was when Jaime was captured and chained up by the Starks—an ordeal that humbled him, humanized him, and eventually left him without a sword hand, struggling to find a new, post-Kingslayer identity for himself. Sure, Jaime could still slaughter his own cousin to escape captivity. But he could also rescue his sidekick Brienne of Tarth from a bear. And pledge to return the Stark girls to their mother, Catelyn. And refuse to kill his brother Tyrion on Cersei's behalf. And so on. He was a compromised, conflicted asshole—but he was basically trying to do the right thing.

Fowler wrote that Jaime's adventure with Brienne was "the best storyline of the season" in Season 3, aside from the Red Wedding.

Jaime's apparent rape of Cersei in the fourth season episode "Breaker of Chains" created controversy among fans and journalists, who debated the show's depiction of sexual violence against women as well as Jaime's character development. The showrunners never commented on what their intention with the scene actually was. The cast members involved initially gave only vague comments, but after the fourth season was released on Blu-ray and the showrunners avoided making any comment about the scene in it (it is conspicuously the only episode which has no commentary track), both Coster-Waldau and Headey publicly stated that the scene was never intended to portray rape at all – they were given no instructions to this effect (such as in the script) nor did they play it that way, and apparently the scene was just edited very confusingly.

In the source novel A Storm of Swords, the sex between Jaime and Cersei in the equivalent scene is consensual. Several critics argued that the TV series' change damaged Jaime's redemption arc. Dodds noted that the episode "irreparably changes the way we see Jaime Lannister". Alyssa Rosenberg of The Washington Post wrote:

What happens next dramatically complicates the work Game of Thrones has done to make Jaime a more explicable, even sympathetic character, given what we learned of his reasons for killing the king he was sworn to protect. Jaime has experienced profound losses over the last two seasons. His hand and his identity as a fighter have been taken from him. His son has been murdered. His father, a toxic, commanding man has returned to his life. And what Cersei is asking of Jaime is that he remove one of the few remaining things that gives him happiness, the little brother who makes him feel better about his hand, from existence. To assuage her pain and grief, Cersei is asking Jaime to inflict more pain on himself ... But his response is not to stop loving her, not to stop believing that he is victim to the gods. Instead, Jaime rapes his sister, passing that sense of unendurable pain on to her. He must know that this is the worst possible way that he could hurt her. Jaime knew that Robert raped Cersei ... Not only does raping Cersei remind his sister of her repeated, humiliating violation, [but] Jaime is poisoning their own relationship, the thing that had been Cersei's antidote to the miseries of her marriage. It is an exceptionally cruel thing for Jaime to do.

Coster-Waldau said, "If you look closer, there are those moments where she—well, I haven't seen the finished edit, of course—but we tried to have it where she goes into it, then she pulls away, she goes in, then she pulls away, but of course he is forcing himself." Later he and his co-star Lena Headey (Cersei) spoke with Entertainment Weekly during the filming of season 5, admitting that they were never directed or intended to film a rape scene. Headey stated:

It's that terrible thing as a woman—talking about something as horrendous as rape and dismissing it, which I'm not. But we never discussed it as that. It was a woman in grief for her dead child, and the father of the child—who happens to be her brother—who never really acknowledged the children, is standing with her. We've all experienced grief. There's a moment of wanting to fill a void, and that is often very visceral, physical. That, for me, is where she was at. There was an emotional block, and [her brother] was just a bit of a drug for her.

The Jaime-Cersei scene was subsequently ignored for the rest of Season 4 and the rest of the series. Writing on the website TheMarySue.com, Rebecca Pahle claimed that not referring to the scene again, instead of as a long and developed subplot, trivialized rape—if, in fact, it was ever the actual intention to portray it as a rape scene. Pahle argued that in real life a woman would be traumatized by being raped, not act as if nothing had happened immediately afterwards. Pahle said that even if the show's creators did not intend it as a rape scene, ignoring questions about the scene and hoping they would go away over time was insensitive to the audience.

In 2016, Christopher Hooton wrote for The Independent:

Game of Thrones is full of characters who are very sure of themselves ... Except Jaime Lannister, who was given a considerable amount of screen time this week in order to establish a little more complexity in his character. Thus far in the show his character arc has gone from "massive jerk", to "still a massive jerk but admirable in how he withstands imprisonment" to "maybe he's starting to redeem himself". This third strand had waned a little in season 6 as he returned to Cersei's side, but showed glimpses of returning in episode 8 as he was reunited with Brienne, about the only character who can appeal to his sense of guilt and honour.

=== Storylines ===
==== Season 1 ====
Jaime's storyline in the first season remains, for the most part, identical to his book storyline, with only minor details altered. Introduced in the pilot, "Winter is Coming", Jaime is established as Queen Cersei Lannister's twin brother and a knight of King Robert Baratheon's Kingsguard. After being discovered by Bran Stark to be having an affair with Cersei, Jaime pushes the boy to his presumed death, only for Bran to survive the fall, albeit with life-altering disability and little recollection of the event. As the season continues, Cersei expresses her concern to Jaime that Bran will one day remember being pushed and expose their incestuous affair, which has spawned all three of Cersei's children. Jaime soon joins his father Tywin Lannister in the field as they face off against Robb Stark's army following the imprisonment of Ned Stark in King's Landing. At the Battle of Whispering Wood, Robb captures Jaime from the Lannister forces and uses him as a hostage. In the aftermath of Jaime's capture, he confesses to Catelyn Stark that he tried to kill Bran, but refuses to reveal why.

==== Season 2 ====
Robb brings a captive Jaime with his camp as they march through the Westerlands, as Robb fears Tywin may coerce one of his bannermen into freeing Jaime. At one point, Jaime attempts to escape by beating his cousin and fellow inmate Alton Lannister to death and strangling his guard, Torrhen Karstark, when he comes to investigate. Jaime is soon recaptured by Robb's bannermen, but the anger of Torrhen's father, Rickard, proves fatal for Robb's campaign in the coming months. After Jaime goads Catelyn by mentioning Ned's rumoured infidelity, she releases him and has Brienne of Tarth escort him to King's Landing to trade for her daughters, Sansa and Arya Stark.

==== Season 3 ====
After spending several weeks on the road, Jaime attempts to free himself from Brienne's escort and return home to King's Landing by himself. During his attempts, however, they are soon captured by a squad of soldiers bearing the banners of House Bolton. As their prisoner, Jaime manages to convince them not to rape Brienne, but their leader, Locke, takes umbrage when Jaime tries to use his status to secure his own release. He chops off Jaime's sword hand. In the days following this incident, Jaime is shown to be weak and delirious, with his wound becoming increasingly infected. The two are taken to Harrenhal, where the former maester Qyburn treats Jaime's wound. Jaime reveals to Brienne the truth about why he killed "Mad King" Aerys II Targaryen during Robert's Rebellion. Roose Bolton lets Jaime return to King's Landing but insists on keeping Brienne prisoner for abetting treason, though Jaime ultimately returns to rescue Brienne from being killed by a bear for Locke's amusement. The two return to King's Landing, and Jaime is reunited with Cersei.

==== Season 4 ====
Tywin gifts Jaime a Valyrian steel sword forged from House Stark's ancestral sword, "Ice", and asks him to resign from the Kingsguard and rule Casterly Rock, disowning him when he refuses. Qyburn fits Jaime with a gilded steel hand, while Tyrion arranges for Jaime to have sword lessons with his bodyguard, Bronn. After their son Joffrey is poisoned at his own wedding, Cersei initially refuses to resume their relationship. However Jaime forces her into having sex in front of Joffrey's body, despite her protests. Jaime gifts Tywin's sword to Brienne, as well as the services of Tyrion's squire, Podrick Payne. Jaime tasks her with finding and protecting Sansa Stark. With Tyrion accused of Joffrey's murder, Jaime refuses to believe his brother is guilty. Jaime convinces Tywin to spare Tyrion in return for leaving the Kingsguard, though Tyrion later chooses trial by combat. Tyrion loses the trial and is sentenced to death, but Jaime releases him from his cell and helps him escape to Essos.

==== Season 5 ====
Cersei blames Jaime for releasing Tyrion, and Jaime later admits to Bronn that he intends to kill Tyrion the next time they meet. When a message arrives from Martells subtly threatening Myrcella as revenge for Prince Oberyn Martell's death in Tyrion's trial by combat, Jaime and Bronn travel to Dorne in secret to retrieve her. As they make their escape, they are accosted by Oberyn's bastard daughters, the Sand Snakes, and engage in a fight before all five are arrested by the Water Gardens' palace guards. Doran Martell realises that the message was sent by Oberyn's paramour Ellaria Sand and decides to send Myrcella and his own son Trystane back to King's Landing with Jaime as a peace offering between the two houses. As the ship sets sail, Myrcella admits to Jaime that she has always known he is her father, and that she feels happy knowing this. The two share a brief embrace before Myrcella suddenly collapses and dies, having been poisoned by Ellaria.

==== Season 6 ====
Jaime returns to King's Landing with Myrcella's corpse. He orders Trystane to stay on the boat outside the city to protect him from Cersei's wrath, and sends word to Doran naming Ellaria as Myrcella's killer. After Doran receives this news, Ellaria promptly kills Doran, sends Obara and Nymeria to King's Landing to kill Trystane, and seizes control of Dorne. At Myrcella's funeral, Jaime confronts the religious leader, the High Sparrow, for having forced Cersei to walk naked through the streets of King's Landing as punishment for adultery, but is forced to stand down at the arrival of the Faith Militant. Jaime enlists the Tyrell army to march on the Sept of Baelor to secure the release of Margaery and Loras Tyrell. However, they find that Margaery has seemingly become a follower of the High Sparrow and that Tommen has forged an alliance with the Faith Militant. As punishment for taking up arms against the Faith, Jaime is removed from the Kingsguard. He is sent to Riverrun with Bronn to assist House Frey in reclaiming the castle from Brynden "Blackfish" Tully and the occupying Tully forces. After a failed parley, Brienne arrives and implores both Jaime and the Blackfish to end the siege without bloodshed, so the Tully rebels can help Sansa Stark retake Winterfell. Brienne fails in this task; therefore, Jaime tries to peacefully persuade Edmure into surrendering the castle. When Edmure refuses to cooperate, he threatens to send his son to him by catapult, which finally makes him agree to his terms of surrender. Edmure is released and promptly opens the gates to the Lannisters, and Jaime manages to resolve the siege without loss of life. Jaime sees Brienne and Podrick fleeing by boat from the castle walls, but only waves a discreet farewell and does not alert his men.

After traveling to House Frey's fortress, The Twins, for a feast to celebrate their victory at Riverrun, Jaime returns to King's Landing. Upon arrival, he is horrified to discover that the Great Sept of Baelor has been destroyed in a wildfire explosion, with the majority of House Tyrell and the entire Faith Militant killed in the attack. He returns to the Red Keep in time to witness Cersei being crowned as Queen of the Seven Kingdoms, immediately realizing that Cersei wiped out every high-ranking rival in the explosion in order to acquire her new power.

==== Season 7 ====
Despite his discomfort at the circumstances leading to Cersei's coronation, Jaime remains loyal to his sister, with Daenerys Targaryen and her forces sailing on Westeros. Cersei agrees to marry Euron Greyjoy after the war against Daenerys is won, but continues her relationship with Jaime, no longer attempting to hide their intimacy from their servants. Jaime negotiates with Randyll Tarly to pledge allegiance to the Lannisters, and with the help of House Tarly's forces, he leads the Lannister army to defeat the Tyrell army at Highgarden. The Tyrell family matriarch, Lady Olenna, had defected to Daenerys following Cersei's role in the death of the other Tyrells. In the aftermath of the battle, Jaime allows Olenna a painless suicide via poison, rather than the torturous death Cersei had ordered. Before dying, Olenna reveals she was responsible for poisoning Joffrey.

As the Lannister forces return to King's Landing via road, they are ambushed by Daenerys' Dothraki forces. Their army is nearly destroyed in the attack, until Bronn temporarily wounds Drogon with a scorpion ballista. Jaime attempts a desperate, horseback lance charge on the dismounted Daenerys, but only escapes being burnt to death when Bronn intervenes. The two men plunge into the Blackwater Rush and are carried downstream, away from the carnage of Daenerys' victory. They return to King's Landing, where Jaime warns Cersei of certain defeat should Daenerys escalate the conflict. Cersei is not entirely convinced of that or Olenna's confession.

Bronn takes Jaime to the Red Keep cellars under the pretense of more training. However, Tyrion (now Hand to Daenerys after his journey in Essos) is there for a parley. Tyrion wants a truce between the two queens in order to form an alliance against the White Walkers, as well as a meeting between Daenerys and Cersei to present evidence of the danger. Tyrion convinces Jaime and relays the message to Cersei, who is skeptical but remains adamant that the Lannisters will prevail against any foe. She also reveals that she is pregnant with Jaime's child.

At the meeting in King's Landing, Jon Snow and the Hound present an undead wight to Cersei's court, and Jaime realizes the impending doom. After some persuasion from Tyrion, Cersei relents to sending the Lannister forces north against the Army of the Dead. However, Cersei reveals to Jaime that she had no intention of sending the Lannister army north to assist in the fight. Instead, she has ordered Euron Greyjoy to travel to Essos and retrieve the Golden Company, an army of sellswords, and wait for the Northern forces to be weakened (or eliminated). Upon learning this, Jaime decides to head North alone and leaves King's Landing as winter arrives.

==== Season 8 ====
Jaime arrives in Winterfell and encounters Bran, who has been waiting for him in the courtyard. He is visibly shocked to see the Stark boy again. Brought before Daenerys and the Northern lords, Jaime justifies his actions against the Starks and Targaryens as being in service to House Lannister. Brienne vouches for Jaime, citing his protection of her from Roose Bolton's soldiers, and Sansa and Jon Snow let him live. Afterwards, Jaime speaks to Bran alone in the Godswood and apologizes for trying to kill him; however, Bran holds no anger towards Jaime for his deeds. Jaime also speaks with Brienne and declares that he wishes to fight under her command in the upcoming battle against the White Walkers. Later, drinking with Brienne and others before battle, Jaime knights Brienne. Jaime fights the Army of the Dead in the Battle of Winterfell alongside Brienne and the others; both survive as the living win. After the battle, Jaime shares an intimate moment with Brienne.

After learning that Daenerys' army is planning to seize King's Landing and execute Cersei, Jaime regrettably ignores Brienne's pleas and leaves for King's Landing to aid his sister. Daenerys' forces capture him on the road, but Tyrion frees him so that he can surrender on Cersei's behalf and take her away from King's Landing and Westeros. Jaime enters King's Landing during the battle between Daenerys' and Cersei's forces. As the city falls, Euron attacks and grievously wounds Jaime, but Jaime manages to kill him. Jaime reunites with Cersei in the Red Keep. The pair are then killed when the dungeon vaults of the castle collapse over them during the sacking of the city. In the series finale, titled "The Iron Throne", Tyrion discovers Jaime and Cersei's crushed bodies buried under the rubble in the crypt under the Red Keep and, in his grief, renounces his loyalty to Daenerys and persuades Jon Snow to kill her. Later on, Brienne records Jaime's accomplishments and writes that he "died protecting his queen."

=== Reception and recognition ===
Matt Roush wrote for TV Guide that Coster-Waldau plays "dastardly" Jaime "with malevolent charisma", and Dodds noted that, despite the "despicable things" he has done, "the Kingslayer remains one of Game of Thrones' most popular characters". Matthew Gilbert of The Boston Globe wrote:

The most riveting characters are the most self-serving, notably the queen, Cersei ... and her twin brother Jaime Lannister ... with whom she is having an incestuous affair. They have gorgeous, aristocratic features, but they are pure, compelling evil.

Coster-Waldau received several nominations for his portrayal of Jaime, including the Critics' Choice Television Award for Best Supporting Actor in a Drama Series in 2013, the Satellite Award for Best Supporting Actor in a Series, Miniseries or Television Film in 2013, the People's Choice Award for Favorite TV Anti-Hero in 2014, the Saturn Award for Best Supporting Actor on Television in 2014, the Zulu Award for Best Actor in 2017, and two Primetime Emmy Award for Outstanding Supporting Actor in a Drama Series nominations.
