= Lord paramount =

Feudal overlord: a lord with no obligations to a higher lord

A lord paramount, in feudal law, is an overlord who holds his fief from no superior lord. Such a person holds allodial title, owing no socage or feudal obligations such as military service, in contrast to a mesne lord who holds his fief from a superior.

== Name ==
The term paramount derives from the Anglo-Norman paramont 'above, superior' and indicates the lord who was the highest authority for a given location. (Note: "Paramount is a word used in our law, signifying the highest lord of the fee, of lands, tenements or hereditaments.") Similar terminology was used for the vassals of mesne lords, who were considered "paravail" from par a val 'below, inferior'. This latter term, however, was confused by later lawyers with "avail" in its senses of help, assistance, and profit and was eventually applied only to the actual occupiers or tenants who worked the land themselves. The vassal of a lord paramount was a tenant-in-chief.

== Instances ==
Usually, under English law after the 1066 Norman Conquest, only the sovereign—the king or queen—was truly lord paramount in its larger sense. All other legal title to land was held through them, particularly after the abolition of most unusual feudal titles and obligations under the 1660 Statute of Tenures. The only major exception—continuing to the present day—is the protection of the privileges of the Duke of Cornwall as lord paramount over the Duchy of Cornwall. A similar situation exists regarding the Duchy of Lancaster but is purely notional, the duchy being held in permanent personal union with the Crown.

Nonetheless, the term does appear in some other contexts. The marquess of Exeter holds the title of hereditary Lord Paramount of Peterborough. The peculiar way in which the baron holding the Lordship of Bowland oversaw himself—some of his estates notionally owing service to others—has also been described in terms of paramouncy and obligation. (The situation was rendered still more academic when it was subsumed first into the Earldom of Lancaster in 1311 and then into the Duchy of Lancaster as an estate held by the Crown in 1351, which gave rise to the title of "Lord King of Bowland".) The title is also sometimes broadly applied to any overlord.

The concept continued to be invoked in other common law jurisdictions, including New York in the 1852 case of De Peyster v. Michael and Australia in the 1992 case of Mabo v Queensland. In the latter case, the High Court affirmed that Elizabeth II was lord paramount over all formal land tenure in Australia while simultaneously establishing the concept of a native title over areas not explicitly legally held by others and continuously occupied by aboriginal people.

== See also ==
- Allodial title
- Escheat
- Feudalism
- Mesne lord
- Native title in Australia
- Overlord
- Seignory
- Sovereignty
- Quia Emptores
- Tenures Abolition Act 1660
