= King (disambiguation) =

A king is a male monarch.

King or KING may also refer to:

== Animals ==
- King (horse)
- King pigeon
- King, a cluster of animals knotted together by the tail, as in rat king and squirrel king

== Arts, entertainment and media ==
=== Fictional entities ===
- King (Art of Fighting)
- King (Mega Man)
- King (The Seven Deadly Sins)
- King (Tekken)
- King (Deltarune), a character in Deltarune
- King, a character in Cave Story
- King, a character in Kamen Rider Blade
- King, a character in The Owl House
- King, a character in Rimba Racer
- The King (Cars)

=== Film ===
- King: A Filmed Record... Montgomery to Memphis, a 1970 American documentary
- King (miniseries), 1978 TV show
- King (1998 film), an Indian film by Srikanth Kulkarni
- King (2002 film), an Indian film by Prabu Solomon
- The King (2005 film), a drama by James Marsh
- The King (2007 film), an Australian biopic
- King (2008 film), an Indian film by Sreenu Vaitla
- King (2009 film), an Indonesian film
- The King (2019 film), a film by David Michôd
- King (2026 film), a film by Siddharth Anand

=== Gaming ===
- King (card game), a card game related to Barbu
- King (chess), the most important chess piece
- King (playing card)
- King, a chess engine for the Chessmaster series
- King, a promoted piece in draughts

=== Music ===
==== Groups ====
- We Are King, an American R&B/soul girl group previously named King
- King 810, an American metal band
- King (pop band), a British pop group
- King (new wave band), a British new wave band

==== Albums ====
- King (Belly album)
- King (Fleshgod Apocalypse album)
- King (Kollegah album)
- King (Nine album)
- King (O.A.R. album)
- King (T.I. album)
- King (Tucker Beathard album)

==== Songs ====
- "King" (UB40 song), 1980
- "King" (Years & Years song), 2015
- "King" (Kanaria song), 2020
- "King" (Florence and the Machine song), 2022
- "King" (Kanye West song), 2026
- "King", a song by King's X from Out of the Silent Planet, 1988
- "King", a song by the Reverend Horton Heat from Spend a Night in the Box, 2000
- "King", a song by Audio Adrenaline from Until My Heart Caves In, 2005
- "King", a song by Almah from Almah, 2006
- "King", a song by Weezer from Weezer, 2008
- "King", a song by Lauren Aquilina from the EP Fools, 2012
- "King", a song by T.I. from Paperwork, 2014
- "King", a song by Attila from Chaos, 2016
- "King", a song by XXXTentacion from the mixtape Revenge, 2017
- "King", a song by Tesseract from Sonder, 2018
- "King", a song by ¥$ from Vultures 1, 2024
- "The King", a song by Raven from Nothing Exceeds Like Excess, 1988
- "The King", a song by The Chariot from Long Live, 2010
- "The King", a song by Enter Shikari from Nothing Is True & Everything Is Possible, 2020
- "The King", a song by Wolfheart from King of the North, 2022
- "K.I.N.G.", a 2006 song by Satyricon

==== Record companies ====
- King Records (Japan), a Japanese record label
- King Records (USA), an American record label
- King Worldwide, a New Zealand record manufacturing plant

=== Television ===
- King (2003 TV series), a Canadian children's show
- King (2011 TV series), a Canadian police drama
- King (miniseries), 1978
- KING-TV, a television station in Seattle, Washington

=== Other uses in arts, entertainment and media ===
- King (magazine), a monthly men's magazine geared toward African American and urban audiences
- King Comics, a short-lived comic book imprint of King Features Syndicate
- KING-FM, a radio station (98.1 FM) licensed to serve Seattle, Washington, US
- KPTR (AM), a radio station that used the call letters KING from 1948 to 1990

== Businesses and organizations ==
- King (automobile), an American automobile manufactured up to 1923
- King (company), the creator of the game Candy Crush
- King Musical Instruments, an instrument manufacturer known for producing marching instruments
- King Pharmaceuticals, a pharmaceutical company acquired by Pfizer in 2010
- King Radio (company), avionics manufacturer known today as BendixKing
- King (restaurant), a restaurant in New York City

== People and fictional characters ==
- King (surname), including a list of people and fictional characters
- King (given name), a list of people and fictional characters with the given name or nickname
- The King (nickname), a list of people with the nickname
- King (footballer, born 1917), Brazilian footballer Nivacir Innocêncio Fernandes
- King (footballer, born 1970), Brazilian footballer Joaquim Devanir Ferreira do Carmo
- King Sunny Adé, stage name of Nigerian musician Sunday Adeniyi Adegeye (born 1946)
- King ov Hell or King (born 1974), Norwegian musician Tom Cato Visnes
- King Von, stage name of African American rapper Dayvon Daquan Bennett (1994–2020)

== Places ==
=== Antarctica ===
- King Peak (Antarctica), Ellsworth Land
- King Valley (Antarctica), Victoria Land

=== Australia ===
- Electoral district of King (New South Wales) (1904–1920, 1927–1973)
- Electoral district of King (South Australia) (2018–)
- King Land District, Western Australia
- King River (Northern Territory), a river in the Northern Territory
- King River (Tasmania), a river in Tasmania
- King River (Victoria), a river in Victoria
- King River (Kimberley region, Western Australia), a river in the Kimberley region of Western Australia
- King River (Western Australia), a river in Western Australia

=== Canada ===
- King, Ontario, a township
- King Peak (British Columbia)
- King Peak (Yukon)

=== United States ===
- Fort King, a former military fort in Florida
- King Archaeological Site, Georgia
- King, Indiana, an unincorporated community
- Kings Grove, Missouri (or King Grove), an extinct hamlet in Missouri
- King, North Carolina, a town
- King, Portland, Oregon, a neighborhood
- King, Wetzel County, West Virginia
- King, Lincoln County, Wisconsin, a town
- King, Waupaca County, Wisconsin, a census-designated place
- King Township (disambiguation)
- King Creek (disambiguation)
- King Peak (California)
- King Peak (Nevada)

=== Other places ===
- King (crater), a lunar crater
- King, Papua New Guinea, a village

== Ships ==
- USS King (DD-242), a US Navy World War II destroyer
- USS King (DDG-41), a US Navy guided missile destroyer

== Transportation ==
- King Street (disambiguation)
- King station (disambiguation)
- King or GWR 6000 Class, a class of steam locomotive

== Other uses ==
- Hurricane King, which struck Florida in 1950
- King: A Life, 2023 biography of Martin Luther King Jr. by Jonathan Eig
- King baronets
- King tide, an unusually high spring tide
- King University, a private university in Bristol, Tennessee
- King, a common fig cultivar

== See also ==
- The King (disambiguation)
- King of the North (disambiguation)
- King County (disambiguation)
- King Hollow, a valley in Tennessee, US
- King Island (disambiguation)
- King Lake (disambiguation)
- King Range (disambiguation)
- King Sound, Western Australia
- King Valley, Victoria, Australia
- Kings (disambiguation)
