= The King =

The King or His Majesty The King most often refers to:

- A specific king
  - Charles III (born 1948), King of the United Kingdom and other Commonwealth realms (r. 2022–present)
  - List of current monarchs of sovereign states

The King or His Majesty The King may also refer to:

== Arts and entertainment ==
=== Fictional characters ===
- Eddie "The King" Faroo, in the 1992 film White Men Can't Jump
- Strip "The King" Weathers, in Cars
- The King, in Drawn Together
- The King, an alias of the DC Comics character King Standish
- King of All Cosmos, in the Katamari video game series

=== Film and television ===
==== Film ====
- The King (1995 film), a Malayalam action thriller
- The King (2002 film), a Greek drama
- The King (2005 film), an American drama
- The King (2007 film), an Australian biopic
- The King – Jari Litmanen, a Finnish documentary about the Finnish football player Jari Limanen
- The King (2017 South Korean film), a political crime drama
- The King (2017 American film), about Elvis Presley
- The King (2019 film), an Australian historical drama directed by David Michôd

==== Television ====
- The King (Vice Principals), an episode of the American TV series Vice Principals
- "The King", a an episode of the 2003 TV series Teenage Mutant Ninja Turtles
- "The King", a 2010 episode of TV series The King Is Dead

=== Music ===
==== Performers ====
- Elvis Presley, commonly known as "'The King' of Rock and Roll"

==== Albums ====
- The King (Anjimile album), 2023
- The King (Benny Carter album), 1976
- The King!, by Illinois Jacquet, 1968
- The King (Teenage Fanclub album), 1991
- The King, a 2021 EP by Sarah Kinsley

==== Songs ====
- "The King" (The Playtones song), 2011
- "The King", by Accept from I'm a Rebel, 1980
- "The King", by The Chariot from Long Live, 2010
- "The King", by Enter Shikari from Nothing Is True & Everything Is Possible, 2020
- "The King", by Grandmaster Flash and the Furious Five from On the Strength, 1988
- "The King", by James Brown from the expanded re-release of Live at the Garden, 2009
- "The King", by Loreena McKennitt from To Drive the Cold Winter Away, 1987
- "The King", by Paul Brandt from This Time Around, 2004
- "The King", by Steeleye Span from Please to See the King, 1971
- "The King", by T.I. from Urban Legend, 2004
- "The King", by Wolfheart from King of the North, 2022
- "The King", by Conan Gray, 2019
- "The King", by Wolves at the Gate, 2012

=== Sculpture ===
- His Majesty the King (Miró), a 1974 sculpture

=== Literature ===
- The King (novel), a 1990 novel by American writer Donald Barthelme

== Other uses ==
- The King, the chess engine used in the Chessmaster series
- The King (nickname), a list of people with the nickname

== See also ==
- King (disambiguation)
- His Majesty (disambiguation)
- The Queen (disambiguation)
