= Melisandre =

Fictional character in novels by George R. R. Martin

Melisandre of Asshai
- A Song of Ice and Fire character Game of Thrones character
- Carice van Houten as Melisandre
- First appearance: Novel: A Clash of Kings (1998); Television: "The North Remembers" (2012)
- Last appearance: Television: "The Long Night" (2019)
- Created by: George R. R. Martin
- Portrayed by: Carice van Houten

In-universe information
- Aliases: The Red Priestess; The Red Woman
- Gender: Female
- Nationality: Unknown; Came from Asshai to Westeros

Melisandre of Asshai is a fictional character in the A Song of Ice and Fire series of fantasy novels by American author George R. R. Martin and its television adaptation, Game of Thrones. She is a priestess of the god R'hllor (also called the Red God and the Lord of Light) from the continent Essos and a close advisor to King Stannis Baratheon during his campaign to take the Iron Throne. She is nicknamed the Red Woman due to the color of her hair and clothes. Melisandre possesses mysterious powers over fire and shadows, and she can resurrect the dead—all of her magical abilities are attributed to her relationship with her deity. She is a prominent example of Martin's use of magic within the story and is the source of several important prophecies that guide the narrative.

Introduced in A Clash of Kings (1998), Melisandre comes to Westeros to spread her faith in the Red God. She subsequently appeared in Martin's A Storm of Swords (2000) and A Dance with Dragons (2011). Melisandre is not a point-of-view character in the first four novels. Her actions are witnessed and interpreted through the eyes of other characters, such as Davos Seaworth and Jon Snow. In the fifth novel, A Dance with Dragons, she has a single point-of-view chapter. George R. R. Martin stated that she will return as a viewpoint character in future novels.

In the HBO television adaptation, Melisandre is portrayed by Dutch actress Carice van Houten, who received a nomination for the Primetime Emmy Award for Outstanding Guest Actress in a Drama Series for her performance.

== Character ==
=== Background ===
Melisandre was born an unknown number of years before the series started, possibly under the name "Melony". As a child slave, she was sold to the Red Temple, the great temple of R'hllor, and trained to serve in the deity's priesthood. Later, believing Stannis Baratheon to be the reincarnation of Azor Ahai, a messianic figure prophesied by her faith, she travels to his island stronghold, Dragonstone, during the events of A Game of Thrones. Tywin Lannister indirectly mentioned her as "a shadowbinder from Asshai" during a private conversation with Tyrion Lannister after the Battle in the Whispering Wood.

Also known as "the Red Woman", Melisandre is described as an exotically beautiful and voluptuous woman from outside Westeros with red eyes and red hair. She always dresses in red robes and wears a red gold choker set with a large, shiny ruby. Melisandre rarely sleeps or eats, possesses magical abilities that allow her to cast glamour and manipulate fire and shadow, has prophetic visions by looking into fire, and takes an aggressively militant stance against the other religions of Westeros.

== Storylines ==
Personal coat of arms of Stannis Baratheon

Melisandre is introduced in the prologue of the second book, A Clash of Kings (1998), and reappears in the third book, A Storm of Swords (2000), as a background character mostly narrated through the viewpoints of Davos Seaworth and, later, Jon Snow. She becomes a point-of-view character in A Dance with Dragons (2011), with a single viewpoint chapter. Author George R. R. Martin, at its publication, confirmed that Melisandre would return as a viewpoint character in the upcoming sixth book, The Winds of Winter.

=== A Clash of Kings ===
Melisandre converts Selyse Baratheon, Stannis's wife, to her religion, which worships a fire deity, R'hllor, as the supreme God, along with several other members of Stannis's court. Stannis's maester, Cressen, fearing Melisandre's power and her influence over him, tries to kill her with poison in a murder-suicide; despite drinking most of the poison, her powers enable her to survive. When Stannis's surviving brother, Renly Baratheon, also claims the throne, Melisandre has a vision of Renly defeating Stannis's forces at King's Landing. She convinces Stannis to impregnate her, resulting in her giving birth to a shadow demon that kills Renly. She also births another demon that kills Storm's End's castellan, Ser Cortnay Penrose, when he refuses to surrender Storm's End. Ser Bryce Caron persuades Stannis to leave Melisandre at Dragonstone during the Battle of the Blackwater, which ends in Stannis's defeat. During the battle, Ser Garlan Tyrell wears Renly's armor and leads the Tyrell–Lannister vanguard, thus fulfilling Melisandre's earlier prophecy.

=== A Storm of Swords ===
Stannis's advisor Ser Davos Seaworth blames Melisandre for Stannis's defeat and plans to assassinate her, but Melisandre sees the plot in her flames and has him arrested. She attempts to persuade Stannis to sacrifice his bastard nephew Edric Storm to awaken stone dragons beneath Dragonstone. Stannis allows her only to leech him and burns the leeches to curse Stannis's rivals: Balon Greyjoy, Robb Stark, and Joffrey Baratheon. All three die in various circumstances soon thereafter. Davos smuggles Edric to Lys to prevent his sacrifice. Melisandre then accompanies Stannis and Davos to the Wall to defeat Mance Rayder's wildling host.

=== A Feast for Crows and A Dance with Dragons ===
Jon Snow swaps Mance Rayder's infant son with Gilly's baby and sends the baby with Gilly, Samwell Tarly, and Maester Aemon to Oldtown to prevent Melisandre from burning the baby to perform fire magic. When Stannis orders Mance Rayder to be burned alive for deserting the Night's Watch, she uses her magic to secretly switch Mance's identity with that of Rattleshirt, another wildling raider, resulting in the latter being burned instead. She later reveals this to Jon Snow and sends Mance to Winterfell with six spearwives to rescue "Arya Stark"—actually Sansa Stark's handmaiden, Jeyne Poole—from Ramsay Bolton. Melisandre remains at the Wall while Stannis marches on Winterfell. Noting that her powers are stronger at the Wall, she asks R'hllor for a vision of Azor Ahai but sees only "Snow". She also warns Jon that she has seen "daggers in the dark". Jon ignores her warnings and is later stabbed by mutineers led by Bowen Marsh.

== TV adaptation ==
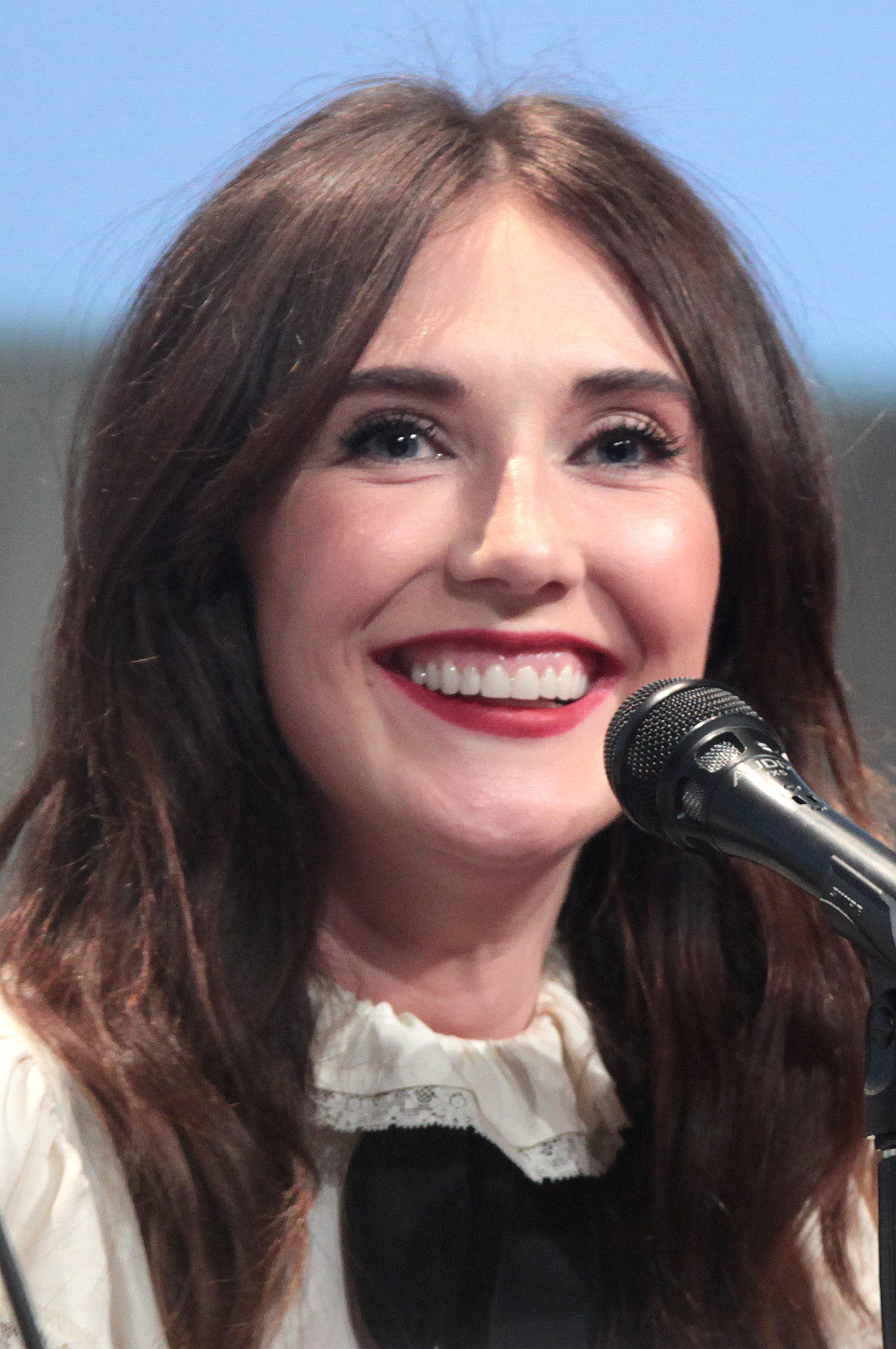
Carice van Houten plays the role of Melisandre in the television series

=== Season 2 ===
Melisandre is introduced during a beachside ceremony on Dragonstone in which she burns the hold's Faith of the Seven statues, drawing the ire of Stannis's maester, Cressen. Cressen attempts to poison her in a murder-suicide; despite drinking the poison, Melisandre is unharmed. She convinces Stannis to impregnate her, giving birth to a shadow demon that kills Stannis's surviving brother, Renly Baratheon, a rival claimant to the Iron Throne. However, Stannis's advisor Ser Davos Seaworth counsels Stannis to leave Melisandre on Dragonstone when he attacks King's Landing; when the attack fails, Melisandre claims that Stannis's defeat was a result of not bringing her to the battle. Stannis attempts to strangle Melisandre in a fit of rage before she makes him understand his role in Renly's death and assures him that his betrayals will be worth it in the end.

=== Season 3 ===
Davos is taken aboard Sallador Saan's pirate ship and hears that Stannis will see no one except Melisandre, who has started burning men alive. Davos, blaming Melisandre for Stannis's defeat, seeks to assassinate her, but before he can attempt to do so, he is imprisoned. She travels to the Riverlands to meet up with the Brotherhood Without Banners, who have taken on Robert Baratheon's bastard Gendry as a blacksmith. During her meeting, Melisandre is astonished when the Red Priest Thoros of Myr reveals he has resurrected the Brotherhood's leader, Ser Beric Dondarrion, six times. Melisandre purchases Gendry from the Brotherhood, much to the fury of Gendry's friend Arya Stark. Before parting ways, Melisandre leaves Arya with a cryptic prophesy: "I see a darkness in you, and in that darkness, eyes staring back at me. Brown eyes, blue eyes, green eyes. Eyes you'll shut forever. We will meet again." Melisandre uses Gendry's blood in a ritual to kill Stannis's rivals. However, before Gendry can be sacrificed, Davos helps him escape. Davos staves off his own execution by showing Stannis a letter from the Night's Watch, claiming that the White Walkers have returned. After burning the letter in the flames, Melisandre corroborates Davos's story and declares that Stannis will need Davos in the future.

=== Season 4 ===
Melisandre begins burning members of Stannis's court alive at Dragonstone. Melisandre accompanies Stannis, Davos, and their army to the Wall. Before the House Baratheon forces sail north, she convinces Selyse Baratheon to bring her and Stannis's daughter, Shireen, to the Wall with them, claiming that the Lord of Light, R'hllor, has use for her.

=== Season 5 ===
Melisandre presides over Mance Rayder's burning. She attempts to seduce Jon Snow, but he rejects her advances. She later joins Stannis and Davos on their mission to take Winterfell from House Bolton. When a large snowstorm delays their march, Melisandre suggests that Stannis sacrifice Shireen. Stannis initially refuses, but after a raiding party led by Ramsay Bolton burns their supplies, he gives in and allows her to burn Shireen at the stake. The blizzard lifts, but half of Stannis's army deserts and Selyse kills herself out of guilt for Shireen's death. Melisandre flees to Castle Black, where her distraught demeanour leads Davos and Jon to realise that Stannis and Shireen are dead.

=== Season 6 ===
Still reeling from Stannis's defeat, Melisandre is further shocked when Jon is assassinated by his officers, given her vision of him fighting at Winterfell. In shock and suffering a crisis of faith, she returns to her sleeping chambers. She removes her ruby necklace while undressing, proving that the necklace is a magical glamour: she is revealed to have a physical body countless years older than she appears.

Following the imprisonment of the mutineers by the wildlings, Davos persuades her to attempt a resurrection of Jon, which, to her shock, is ultimately successful. Melisandre comes to believe that the "prince that was promised" was not Stannis but Jon and dedicates herself to his service. Realizing that her constant meddling had done more harm than good, Melisandre works no magic without Jon's permission, nor does she try to convert anyone—including Snow—to worship the Lord of Light.

Melisandre joins Jon in his march on Winterfell to confront Ramsay Bolton. Although Jon forbids her from resurrecting him again if he falls, Melisandre says she will at least try, as the Lord of Light might still need him. In the aftermath of House Stark's recapture of Winterfell (which validates her vision), Melisandre is confronted by Davos, who has discovered that she burned Shireen at the stake. Jon Snow exiles her from the North, threatening to have her executed if she ever returns. Melisandre protests that she is now dedicated to Jon's cause of defeating the White Walkers, but ultimately agrees to leave and rides south.

=== Season 7 ===
Melisandre arrives on Dragonstone, which is now occupied by Daenerys Targaryen. Melisandre claims that both she and Jon (who has been crowned King in the North since her exile) are the "prince that was promised" and suggests that Daenerys summon Jon to Dragonstone to hear of his experiences fighting the White Walkers. When Jon and Davos arrive on Dragonstone to meet Daenerys, Melisandre avoids them and decides to return to Volantis. Although Daenerys's advisor Varys warns that Melisandre will not be safe if she ever returns to Westeros, she declares that she will eventually make one final journey to Westeros to die.

=== Season 8 ===
Melisandre returns to Winterfell as the forces of the living prepare to battle the White Walkers and their army of wights, setting Daenerys's Dothraki horde's arakhs on fire before they charge the dead. She is confronted by Davos upon entering Winterfell but assures him she will be dead before dawn. When Daenerys cannot see Davos's signal to light a defensive trench, Grey Worm escorts Melisandre outside to use her abilities to ignite it.

The wights ultimately make their way into the castle, and Melisandre takes refuge in the Great Hall, later joined by Arya, Sandor Clegane, and a mortally wounded Beric Dondarrion. Melisandre tells Arya that Beric was resurrected for a purpose that has now been served, and reminds her of her prophecy that Arya would "shut many eyes forever", emphasizing the blue eyes of the wights and White Walkers. Arya realizes that her third victim is the Night King, commander of the White Walkers, and leaves for Winterfell's godswood, where she ultimately destroys the Night King, in doing so destroying the rest of the army of the dead. In the battle's aftermath, with her purpose fulfilled, Melisandre leaves Winterfell, removes her necklace, and collapses into dust.

=== Recognition and awards ===
Year	Award	Category	Result	Ref.
2014	Screen Actors Guild Award	Outstanding Performance by an Ensemble in a Drama Series	Nominated	
2016	Screen Actors Guild Award	Outstanding Performance by an Ensemble in a Drama Series	Nominated	
2017	Screen Actors Guild Award	Outstanding Performance by an Ensemble in a Drama Series	Nominated	
2019	Primetime Emmy Award	Outstanding Guest Actress in a Drama Series	Nominated	
