= King Street =

King Street may refer to:

== Roads ==
=== Australia ===
- King Street, Melbourne, Victoria
- King Street, Newtown, New South Wales
- King Street, Perth, Western Australia
- King Street, Sydney, New South Wales

=== Canada ===
- King Street (Toronto), Ontario
- King Street, Hamilton, Ontario
- King Street, Dundas, Ontario, Hamilton
- King Street, Waterloo Region, Ontario

=== Channel Islands ===
- King Street, Saint Helier, Jersey

=== United Kingdom ===
- King Street, Bristol, England
- King Street, Cambridge, England
- King Street, Ipswich, Suffolk, England
- King Street, London, City of London, England
- King Street, Hammersmith, London, England
- King Street, St James's, London, England
- King Street, Manchester, England
- King Street (Roman road), in eastern England
- King Street, Aberdeen, Scotland
- King Street, Kilmarnock, Scotland

=== United States ===
- King Street District, Jacksonville, Florida
- State Street (Boston), Massachusetts, known as King Street between 1708 and 1784
- King Street (Alexandria, Virginia)
- King Street, Danbury, Connecticut

== Other uses ==
- King Street, Essex, a hamlet in England
- King Street Gaol (1798), in Toronto, Ontario, Canada
- King Street Gaol (1824), in Toronto, Ontario, Canada
- King Street Wharf, a former maritime industrial area in Sydney Harbour, New South Wales, Australia

== See also ==
- List of streets named after Martin Luther King Jr.
- King Street Bridge (disambiguation)
- King Street station (disambiguation)
