= Cecil B. Moore station =

Rapid transit station in Philadelphia

Cecil B. Moore
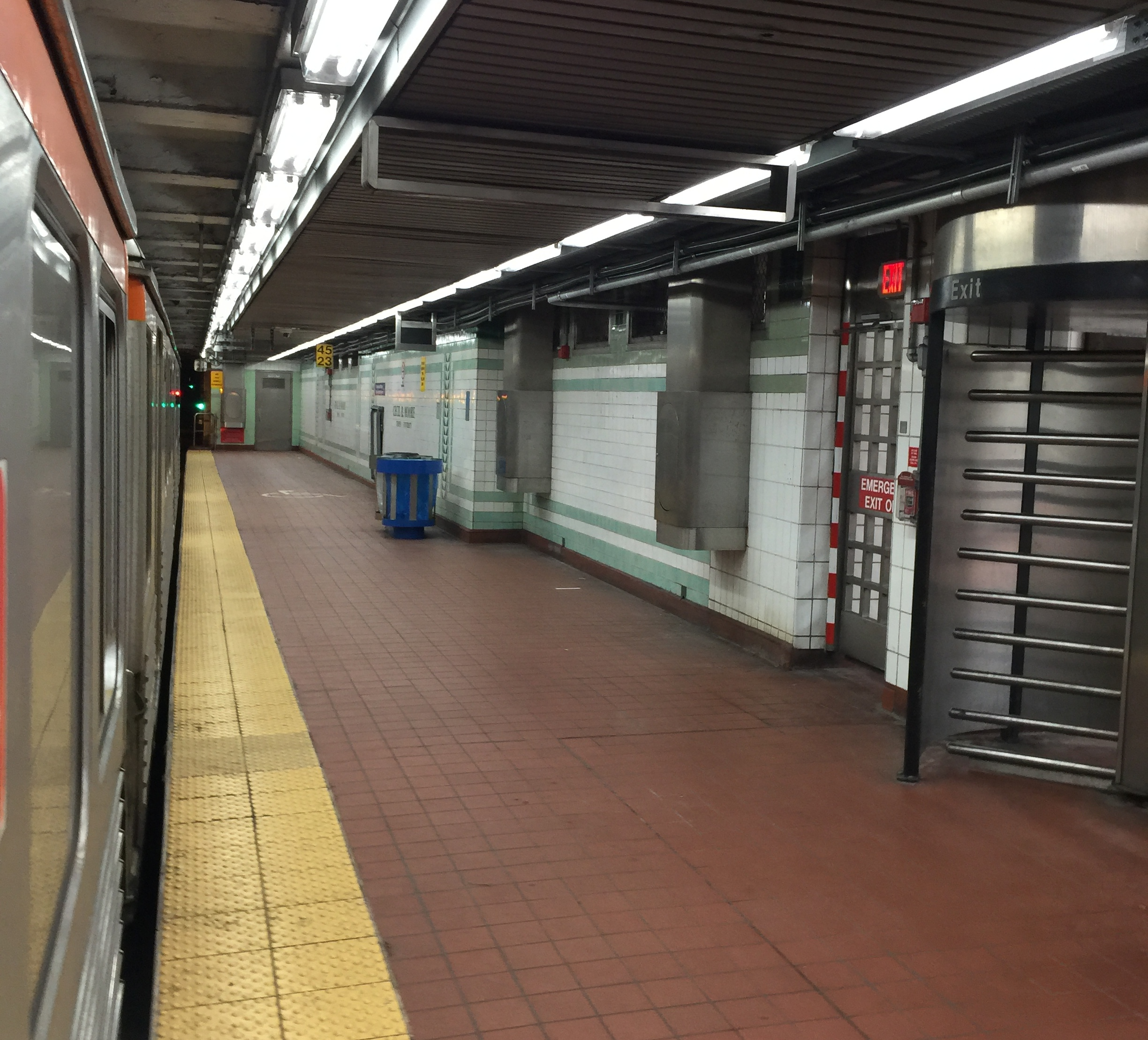
- Cecil B. Moore station platform

General information
- Other names: Cecil B. Moore/Temple University
- Location: 1700 North Broad Street; Philadelphia, Pennsylvania
- Coordinates: 39°58′48″N 75°09′25″W
- Owner: City of Philadelphia
- Operator: SEPTA
- Platforms: 2 side platforms
- Tracks: 4
- Connections: SEPTA City Bus: 3, 4, 16

Construction
- Structure type: Underground
- Accessible: Yes

History
- Opened: September 1, 1928
- Former names: Columbia (1928–1995)

Services
Preceding station	SEPTA Metro	Following station
Broad–Girard toward NRG Station	B (SEPTA Metro)	Susquehanna–Dauphin toward Fern Rock T.C.
and do not stop here
Location

Cecil B. Moore station is a subway station on the SEPTA Metro B in the Cecil B. Moore neighborhood in North Philadelphia, Pennsylvania. It is a local station that has four tracks, with only the outer two being served. There are separate fare control areas for northbound and southbound trains, with no crossover, and a large pavilion entrance with an escalator on the northbound side. This is the main station serving Temple University, and therefore is one of the busiest stops on the line. Susquehanna–Dauphin station, six blocks north, also serves Temple University, although it is further from many of the main locations on campus. As of June 2007, Cecil B. Moore had an average of 5,644 daily boardings.

== History ==
Columbia station was opened as part of the Broad Street Line on September 1, 1928. Following the 1987 renaming of the station's namesake street Columbia Avenue in honor of Cecil B. Moore, the station was renamed in 1995.

== Gallery ==
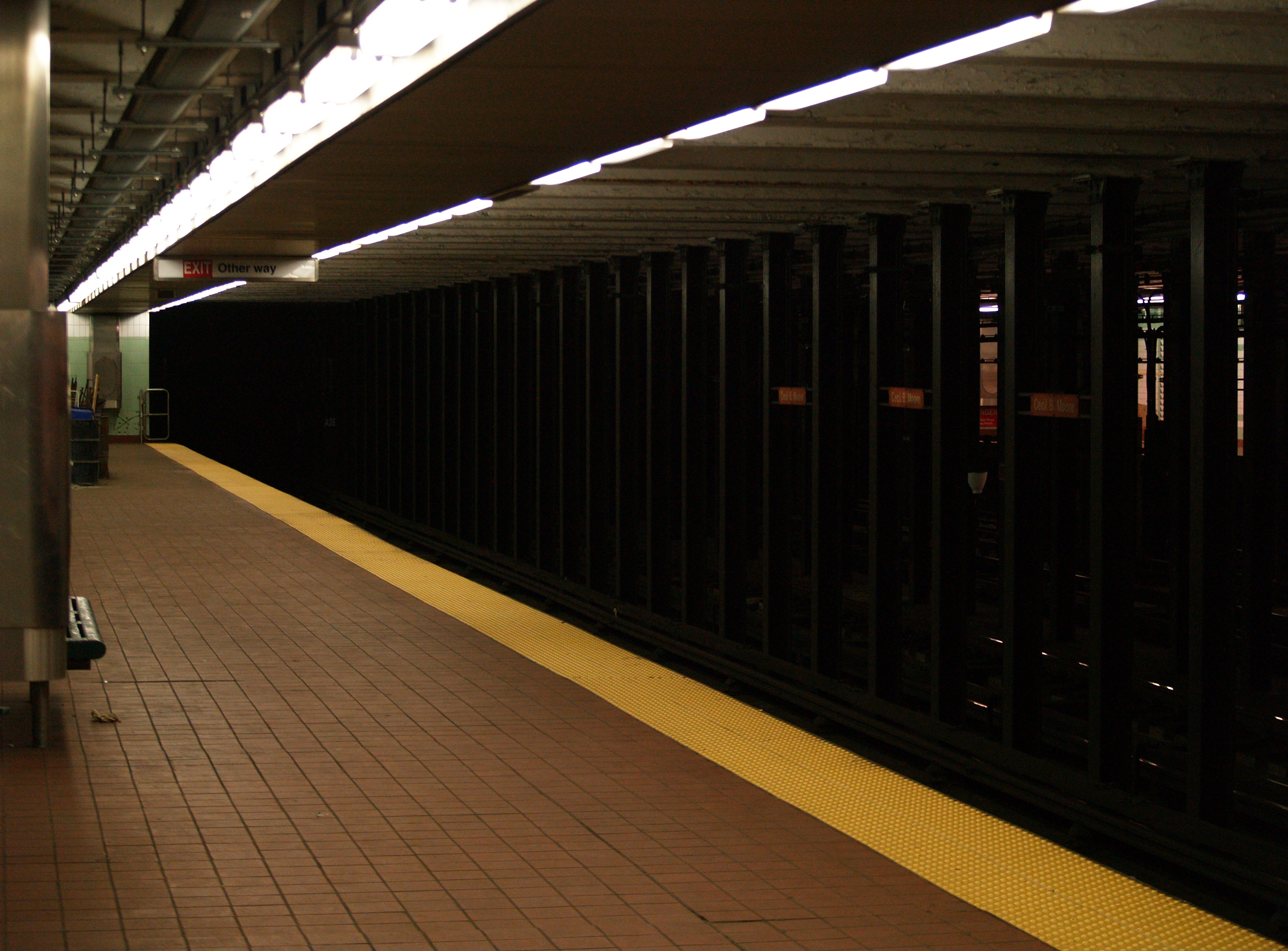
Platform

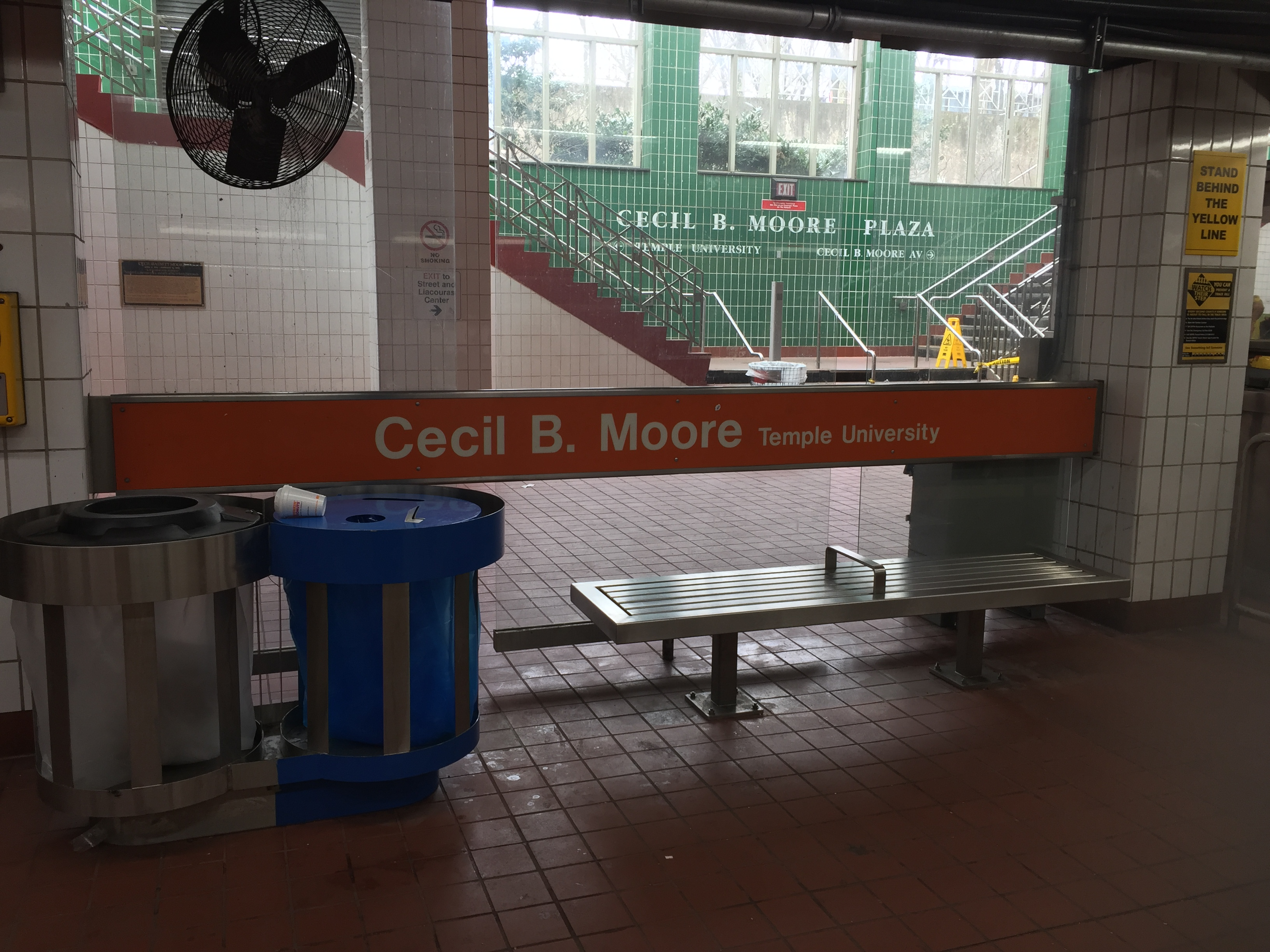
Cecil B Moore tile work

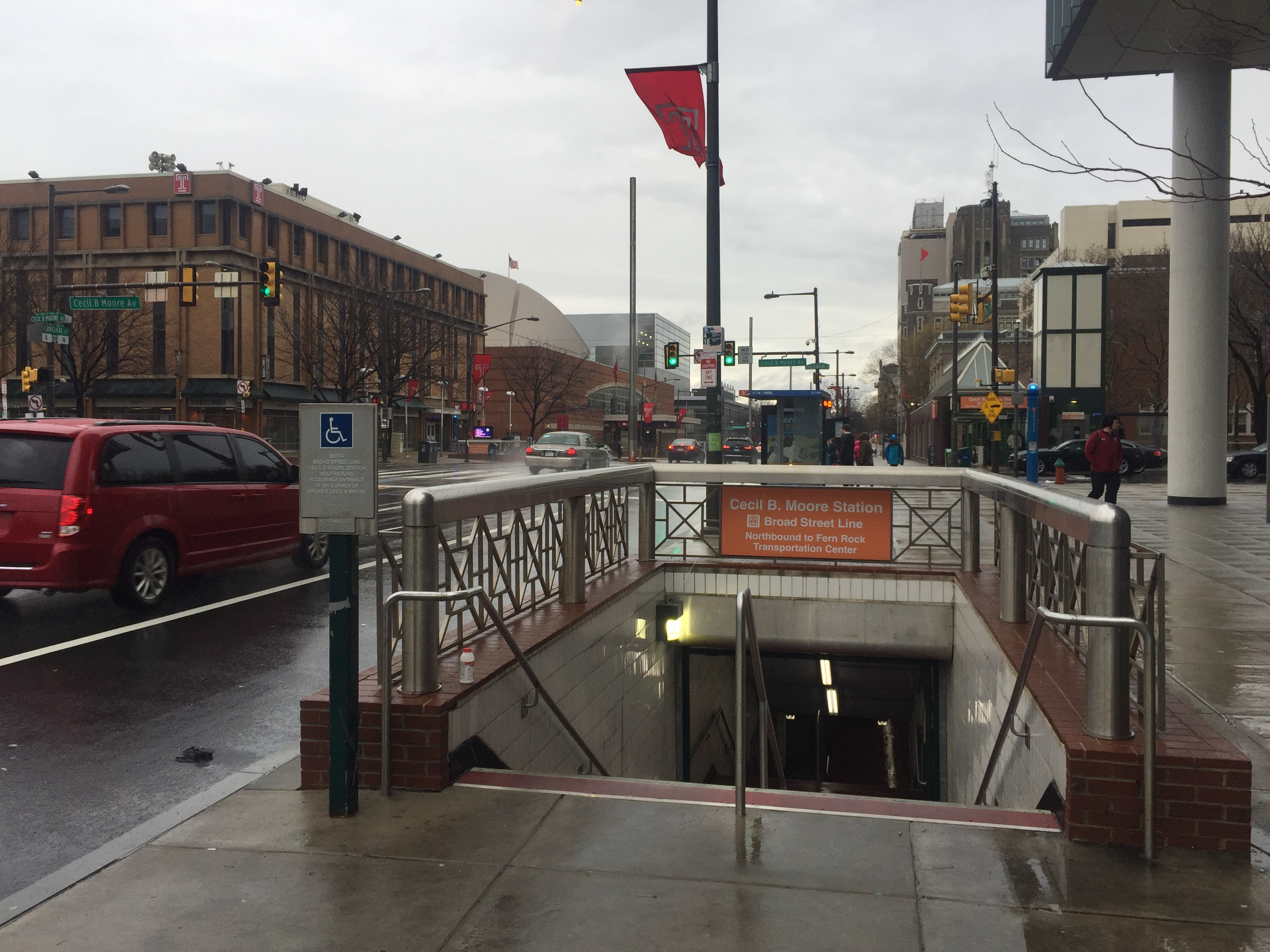
The station entrance with Temple University’s Liacouras Center in the background

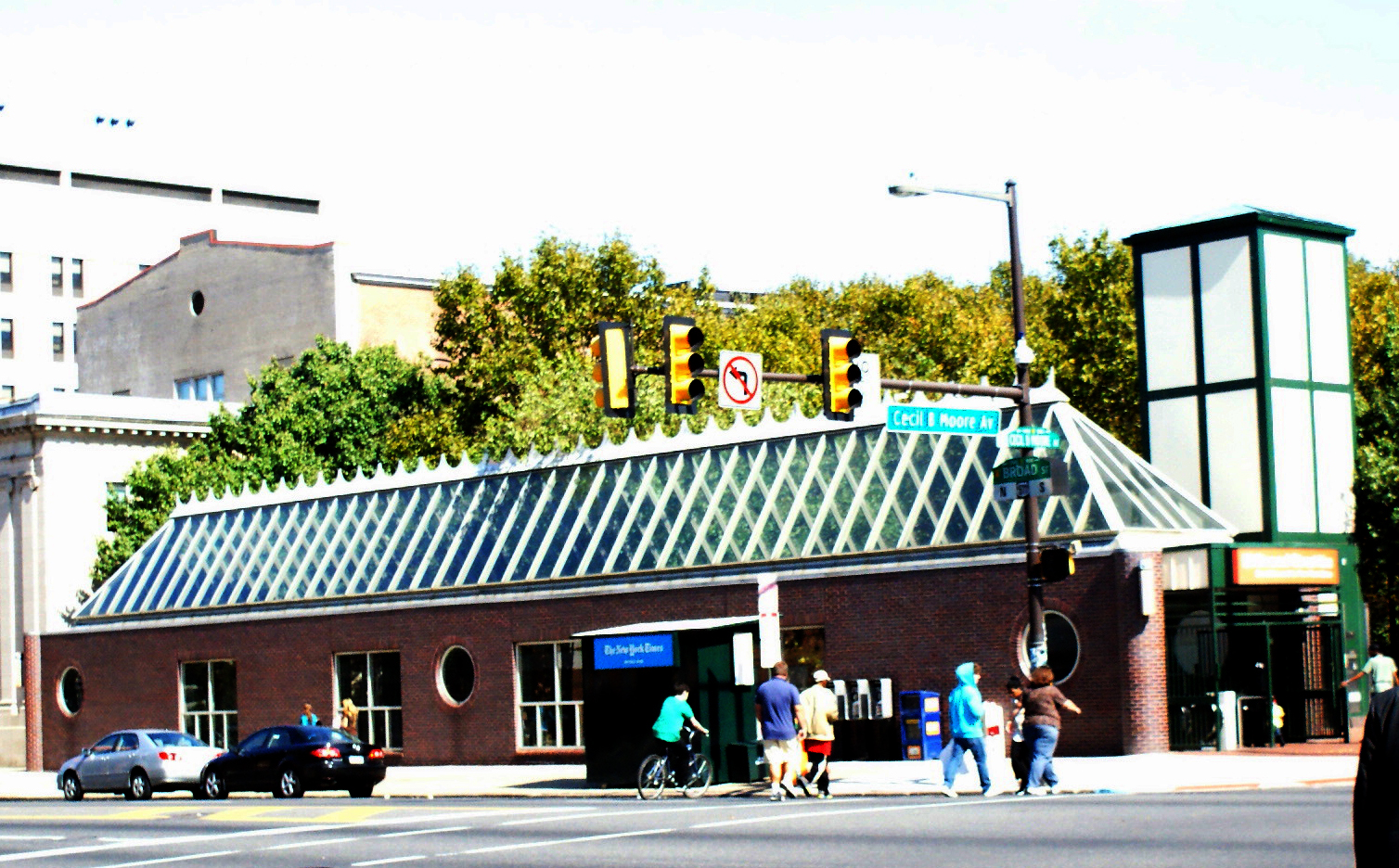
Station entrance

== See also ==
- Hamilton E. Holmes station, another train station named after a civil rights leader Hamilton E. Holmes
- Martin Luther King station, a list of stations named after civil rights leader Martin Luther King Jr.
