= Martin Luther King station =

Martin Luther King station may refer to:

- Martin Luther King Jr. station (Los Angeles Metro), an underground light rail station in Los Angeles, California
- Dr. Martin Luther King Jr. Plaza station (Metrorail), a rapid transit station in Miami-Dade County, Florida
- King Memorial station, a rapid transit station in Atlanta, Georgia
- Martin Luther King Boulevard/Mack Avenue station, a streetcar stop in Detroit, Michigan
- Martin Luther King Drive station, a streetcar station in Jersey City, New Jersey
- Martin Luther King Jr. Plaza (Toledo), the main passenger rail and intercity bus station of Toledo, Ohio
- MLK Jr. station (Capital MetroRail), a commuter rail station in Austin, Texas
- MLK Jr. station (DART), a light rail station in Dallas, Texas
- MacGregor Park/Martin Luther King Jr. station, a light rail station in Houston, Texas

== See also ==
- Martin Luther King (disambiguation)
- King station (disambiguation)
- Cecil B. Moore station
- Hamilton E. Holmes station
