= King Township =

King Township may refer to:

== In Canada ==
- King Township, Ontario

== In the United States ==
- King Township, Johnson County, Arkansas, in Johnson County, Arkansas
- King Township, Christian County, Illinois
- King Township, Winnebago County, Iowa
- King Township, Polk County, Minnesota
- King Township, Oregon County, Missouri
- King Township, Bedford County, Pennsylvania
- King Township, Tripp County, South Dakota, in Tripp County, South Dakota
