= King Street station (disambiguation) =

King Street station may refer to:

- King Street Station, a railway station in Seattle, Washington, United States
- King Street–Old Town station, a metro station in Alexandria, Virginia, United States (formerly King Street station until 2012)
- San Francisco station, a multi-modal station in San Francisco, California, United States
- Oldham King Street tram stop, a light-rail stop in Oldham, England, United Kingdom
- King Drive station, an 'L' station in Chicago, Illinois, United States

== See also ==
- King station (disambiguation)
- King Street (disambiguation)
