= Themes in A Song of Ice and Fire =

Analyses of the A Song of Ice and Fire series

A Song of Ice and Fire is an ongoing series of epic fantasy novels by American novelist and screenwriter George R. R. Martin. The first installment of the series, A Game of Thrones, which was originally planned as a trilogy, was published in 1996. The series now consists of five published volumes, and two more volumes are planned. The series is told in the third-person through the eyes of a number of point of view characters. A television series adaptation, Game of Thrones, premiered on HBO in 2011.

A Song of Ice and Fire takes place in a fictional world, primarily on a continent called Westeros, and additionally on a large landmass to the east, known as Essos. Three main story lines become increasingly interwoven: a dynastic civil war for control of Westeros among several competing families; the rising threat of the Others, who dwell beyond the immense wall of ice that forms Westeros's northern border; and the ambitions of Daenerys Targaryen, exiled daughter of the deposed king, to return to Westeros and claim her throne.

== Magic and realism ==
Martin has said he believes in "judicious use of magic" in epic fantasy. "I wanted to keep the magic in my book subtle and keep our sense of it growing, and it stops being magical if you see too much of it." Effective magic in literature, Martin claims, needs to be "unknowable and strange and dangerous with forces that can't be predicted or controlled." Before A Song of Ice and Fire, Martin initially considered writing an alternate historical novel without any magic. He therefore avoided overtly magical elements in the series. While the amount of magic gradually increases, Martin claims the series will end with less magic than many other fantasies have.

Since all fiction is essentially untrue, Martin believes it needs to reflect reality at least in its core. He agrees with William Faulkner's statement in his Nobel Prize speech that "the human heart in conflict with itself" is the only thing worth writing about, regardless of the genre. He thus tried to give the story a little more historical fiction feel than a fantastic feel like previous authors' books, with less emphasis on magic and sorcery and more emphasis on swordplay and battles and political intrigue. The Atlantic noted that the series attempts to mash together fantasy and realism as two seemingly contradictory genres of literature, and Martin's books are generally praised for their realism. The Atlantic saw the realist heart of the Ice and Fire books in that "magic lingers only on the periphery of the world in which the characters dwell, and is something more terrifying than wondrous. ... It's a fantasy story that defies expectations by ultimately being less about a world we'd like to escape, at times becoming uncomfortably familiar to the one we live in."

The unresolved larger narrative arc of Ice and Fire encourages speculation about future story events. According to Martin, much of the key to Ice and Fire's story future lies sixteen years in the fictional past, of which each volume reveals more. Events planned from the beginning are foreshadowed, although Martin heeds story developments not to be predictable. The viewpoint characters, who serve as unreliable narrators, may clarify or provide different perspectives on past events. What the readers believe to be true may therefore not necessarily be true.

=== World ===
Martin intentionally avoids most overt fantasy elements in Ice and Fire, preferring instead to have "carefully rationed magic". He set the Ice and Fire story in an alternate version of Earth or a "secondary world". The story takes place primarily on a continent called Westeros, but also on another continent to the east, known as Essos. The style varies to fit each character and their setting; Daenerys's exotic realm may appear more colorful and fanciful than Westeros, which is more closely based on the familiar medieval history of Europe. Martin was intentionally vague with the size of the Ice and Fire world, omitting a scale on the maps to discourage prediction of travel lengths based on measured distances, though the continent of Westeros may be considered to be the size of South America. Complete world maps are deliberately not made available so that readers may better identify with people of the real Middle Ages who were unaware of distant places. As each new book has added one or two maps, readers may be able to piece together a world map by the end of the series.

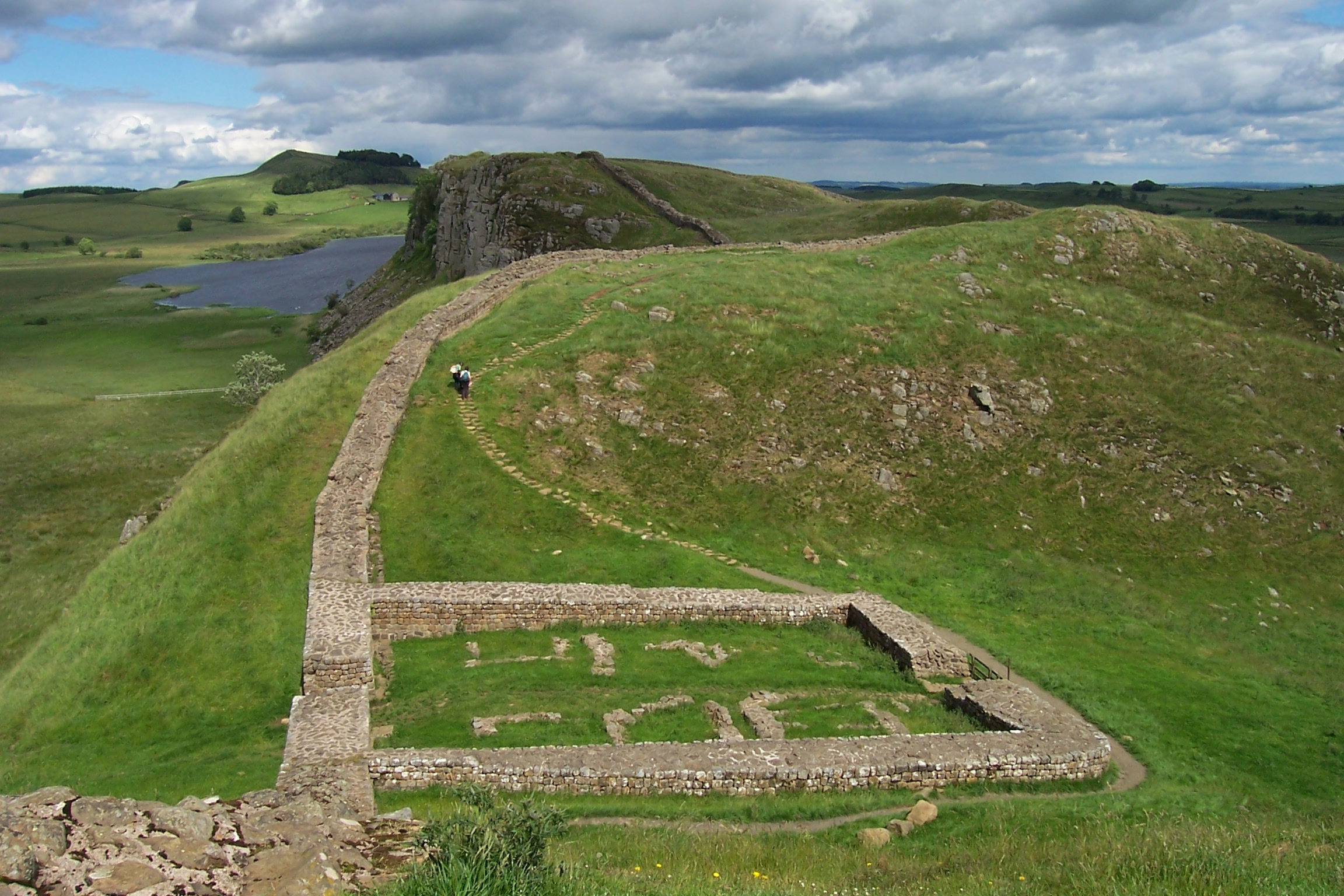
The Wall in the Ice and Fire series was inspired by Hadrian's Wall in the North of England.

The fictional history of Westeros stretches back some twelve thousand years. The Ice and Fire story can be considered to be set in a post-magic world where people no longer believe in dragons and the Others. The characters understand only the natural aspects of their world, and the magical elements like the Others are not within their understanding. Coming from an impoverished family background of former wealth, Martin always felt attracted to stories of fallen civilizations and lost empires. The lost empire of Valyria in Ice and Fire was once a high civilization similar to Rome before the Dark Ages. These elements may give the story a poignant sadness. The Wall, which Martin believes to be unique in fantasy, was inspired by Martin's visit to Hadrian's Wall in the North of England close to the border with Scotland. Looking out over the hills, Martin wondered what a Roman centurion from the Mediterranean would feel, not knowing what threats might come from the north. The size, length, and magical powers of the wall were adjusted for genre demands. Similarly, the Titan, an extremely large statue in the city of Braavos, is comparable to the historical Colossus of Rhodes.

One of the most conspicuous aspects of the world of Westeros is the long and random nature of the seasons. Fans have developed lengthy scientific theories for the seasons, but Martin insists on a supernatural fantasy explanation rather than a scientific one. Martin rather enjoyed the symbolism of the seasons, with summer as a time of growth and plenty and joy, and winter as a dark time where one has to struggle for survival.

The world of A Song of Ice and Fire is primarily populated by humans, although giants, the so-called "Others," and the Children of the Forest appear as other sentient species in the extreme North of Westeros, beyond the Wall. In addition to ordinary animals such as dogs, cats, and horses, some species of animals inhabiting Martin's world are similar to real-world Pleistocene megafauna such as aurochs, direwolves, and mammoths. Of these megafauna, only the aurochs is commonly encountered throughout Westeros as a domesticated herd animal. Direwolves and mammoths are only found in the Lands Beyond the Wall in the extreme north. The direwolves adopted by the Stark children exhibit signs of being far more intelligent than common dogs or wolves. Each wolf pup grows to reflect the temperament of the child they bond with. Mythical creatures such as mermaids, unicorns, manticores, kraken, leviathans, basilisks, and most prominently dragons (although their description is more akin to wyverns) also appear or are mentioned.

=== Children of the Forest ===
Children of the Forest are presented as the original inhabitants of Westeros, but unseen for thousands of years. They are thought to be diminutive humanoid creatures, dark and beautiful, with mysterious powers over dreams and nature. They were graceful, quick, and agile, able to move with quiet swiftness on land as well as through mountains and trees. George R. R. Martin has said: "The children are ... well, the children. Elves have been done to death".

In the background of the series, the Children of the Forest fought a series of wars against the First Men (a civilization of primitive warriors wielding bronze weapons and riding horses), until the Pact of the Isle of Faces, wherein the First Men obtained control of the open lands and the Children of the Forest retained theirs over the forests. The Pact was weakened after four thousand years by the emergence of the Others, who were vanquished by the combined use of obsidian, fire, the magic of the old gods, and the building of the Wall. In the following centuries, the Children gradually disappeared, and it was presumed that they left Westeros or became extinct. Little of their legacy is present in the series beyond their worship of nameless gods, still practiced by some in the North, and the remaining Weirwoods through which the Children communicated telepathically.

=== The Others ===
The Others (referred to as White Walkers in the television series) are mysterious creatures that dwell in the northern regions of Westeros, beyond the Wall.

The Others resurface at the beginning of A Game of Thrones after the War for the Dawn, which led to the construction of the Wall. They appear as tall, gaunt, graceful humanoids with glowing blue eyes and pale skin. They wear armor that shifts in color with every step, and wield thin crystal swords capable of shattering steel.

=== Dragons ===
In the backstory of A Song of Ice and Fire, Aegon the Conqueror brought three dragons to Westeros and used them to unify the Seven Kingdoms. His descendants bred them in captivity, but most were killed in a civil war between rival Targaryen heirs 150 years before the story begins. At the beginning of the story, they are considered extinct until late in A Game of Thrones when Daenerys hatches her three dragon eggs in the funeral pyre of Khal Drogo.

The dragons in the story are scaled, fire-spewing, reptilian creatures with animal-level intelligence. Though some accompanying artwork for A Song of Ice and Fire portrays them with four legs and a detached set of wings, George R.R. Martin insists that this is incorrect. His dragons are serpentine and slender, and they have four (not six) limbs (similar to a wyvern), the front two being wings. Martin first considered having the Targaryens use a pyrotechnic effect to feign dragon powers, but decided on living dragons instead, though he refused to give them human speech. Comparing the dragons to modern-day nuclear arsenals, Martin questions whether supreme power enables the user to reform, improve, or build society.

== Global climate change ==
It's kind of ironic because I started writing Game of Thrones all the way back in 1991, long before anybody was talking about climate change. But there is — in a very broad sense — there’s a certain parallel there.

— George R. R. Martin, interview with The New York Times

In the series, the threat of a global climate change is ever present. There are no regular seasons that occur at expected intervals. Winter and the accompanying cold temperatures it brings may last for years, or even a decade or longer. During this time, thousands, if not millions, may die from starvation or the ravages of war and violence that often coincide with mass starvation. The White Walkers or Others represent the personification of this threat. Yet, despite the nature of this threat as an existential danger to the very survival of the human race, many of the powerful in Westeros choose to deny its existence or ignore it. This is most prominently seen in the conflict between the Starks and the Lannisters that forms the basis for the story in A Song of Ice and Fire. The Starks (along with their patronage of the Night's Watch) defend all of Westeros against the threat of winter. They acknowledge its inevitability and do everything in their power to prepare for and prevent the disasters that may come from a prolonged winter and open warfare with the White Walkers. However, their attempts to warn others about the threat and rally the great houses to their cause are generally not successful.

== Politics and society ==
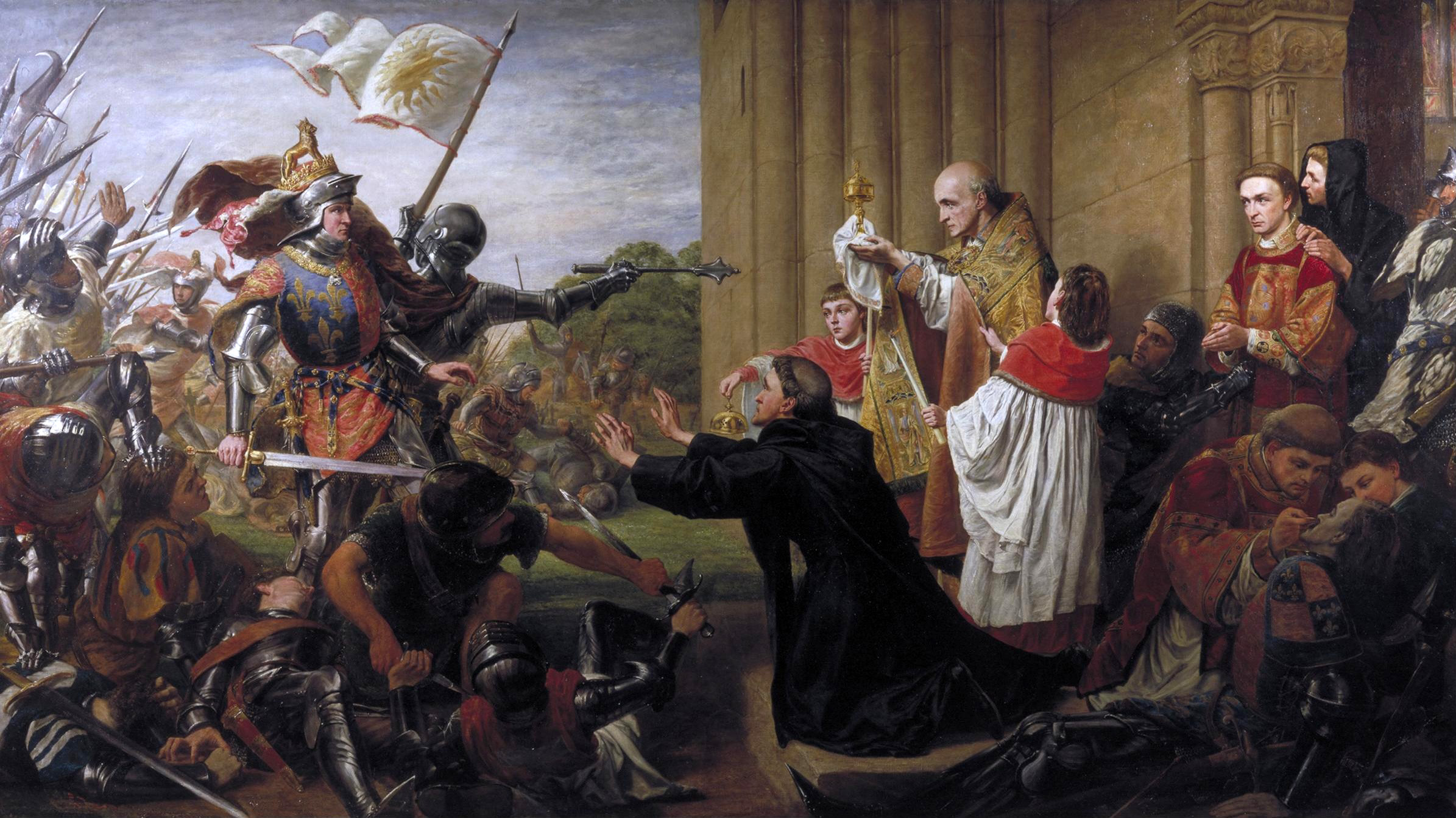
Sanctuary by Richard Burchett, 1867. The Ice and Fire series was partly inspired by the Wars of the Roses (pictured), a series of dynastic civil wars for the throne of England.

Ethan Sacks of New York's Daily News found the story focused "more on Machiavellian political intrigue than Tolkien-esque sword and sorcery". Since Martin drew on historical sources to build the Ice and Fire world, Damien G. Walter of London's The Guardian saw a startling resemblance between Westeros and England in the period of the Wars of the Roses, where "One throne unifies the land but great houses fight over who will sit upon it. With no true king the land is beset with corrupt, money-grubbing lords whose only interest is their own prestige. Two loose alliances of power pit a poor but honorable North against a rich and cunning South. And the small folk must suffer through it all, regardless of which side wins." As in the Middle Ages, the characters define their alliances by their home towns or kinship, not by modern-day concepts like countries or nationalism. The king was seen as an avatar of God, so the legitimacy of kingship was very important. Martin wanted to show the possible consequences of the leaders' decisions, as general goodness does not automatically make competent leaders and vice versa.

Adam Serwer of The Atlantic regarded A Song of Ice and Fire as "more a story of politics than one of heroism, a story about humanity wrestling with its baser obsessions than fulfilling its glorious potential" where the emergent power struggle stems from the feudal system's repression and not from the fight between good and evil (see section § Moral ambiguity). Damien G. Walter saw Martin's strength in "his compendious understanding of the human stories driving the grand political narrative. There does not seem to be a single living soul in the land of Westeros that Martin does not have insight into, from the highest king to the lowest petty thief. ... It is a world of high stakes, where the winners prosper and the losers are mercilessly ground under heel. Against this tapestry every one of Martin's characters is forced to choose between their love for those close to them and the greater interests of honor, duty and the realm. More often than not, those who make the noble choice pay with their lives."

Writing in Foreign Affairs, Charli Carpenter noted that "leaders disregard ethical norms, the needs of their small-folk, and the natural world at their own peril. Jockeying for power by self-interested actors produces not a stable balance but sub-optimal chaos; gamesmanship and the pursuit of short-term objectives distracts players from the truly pressing issues of human survival and stability."

The novels reflect the frictions of medieval class structures, where people were brought up to know the duties and privileges of their class. Si Sheppard of Salon found this problematic, as it conformed to the prevailing trope in fantasy fiction whereby political agency is the exclusive right of a hierarchical elite. Martin also explores how far birth and social class, or values and memories determines people's identity. Among the characters losing their names and identities are Arya Stark and Theon Greyjoy; Arya goes through several different identities before joining the Faceless Men with the ultimate goal of becoming no one so as to be able to freely assume other identities. On the other hand, Quentyn Martell and his companions deliberately mask their identities by assuming false names, although it never really affects who they are in private.

== Moral ambiguity ==
A common theme in the fantasy genre is the battle between good and evil, though Martin deliberately defied the conventions and assumptions of neo-Tolkienian fantasy. Whereas The Lord of the Rings had succeeded with externalizing villainy through ugliness, Martin felt that Tolkien's imitators oversimplified the struggle between good and evil into stereotypical clichés. William Faulkner's 1950 Nobel Prize speech rather serves as a paradigm for Martin's writing; Faulkner said that only the human heart in conflict with itself was worth writing about. Just like people's capacity for good and for evil in real life, Martin explores the questions of redemption and character change in the Ice and Fire series. Laura Miller of The New Yorker summarized that "Characters who initially seem likable commit reprehensible acts, and apparent villains become sympathetic over time", and The Atlantic said that even the TV adaptation "does not present the viewer with an easily identifiable hero, but with an ensemble of characters with sometimes sympathetic, often imperfect motives".

"What [marks Martin] as a major force for evolution in fantasy, is his refusal to embrace a vision of the world as a Manichaean struggle between Good and Evil. ... Martin's wars are multifaceted and ambiguous, as are the men and women who wage them and the gods who watch them and chortle, and somehow that makes them mean more."

— Lev Grossman of Time in 2005

Attracted to gray characters instead of orcs and angels, Martin regards the hero as the villain on the other side. The Wall's Night's Watch, whom Martin described as "criminal scum [who] are also heroes and they wear black", was a deliberate twist on fantasy stereotypes. Furthermore, the use of black as the identifying color for the essentially good Night's Watch and the use of white for the much corrupted Kingsguard is another example of Martin subverting traditional fantasy, which tends to link light colors with good and darker ones with evil. Considering universally adored or hated characters as too one-dimensional, Martin writes his characters with well-mixed natures so that readers will invest in and identify with them. The actions and politics in the novels leave it to the reader to decide who is good and evil. Characters are explored from many sides through the multiple viewpoint structure so that, unlike in a lot of other fantasy, the supposed villains can provide their viewpoint. This is necessary since, in the real world throughout history, most human beings have justified their deeds as the right thing and the opponent's as villainous. It may not always be easy to determine who represents the good and evil side in real life, as some of the darkest villains in history had some good things about them, and the greatest heroes had weaknesses and flaws. However, according to Martin, Tyrion Lannister is the most morally neutral main character in the book, which, along with his cynicism, is what makes him his favorite character.

== Violence and death ==
David Orr of The New York Times praised Martin as "unapologetically coldblooded", saying the book series was no children's literature with "a boy being thrown off a balcony, a woman having her face bitten off, a man having his nose cut off, a girl having her ear sliced off, multiple rapes, multiple massacres, multiple snarfings (devouring) of people by animals [and] multiple beheadings". James Hibberd of Entertainment Weekly saw Martin's ruthlessness about killing beloved characters as a hallmark of the series, leading "fans to throw their books across the room—only to go pick them up again". Bill Sheehan of The Washington Post noted that the characters' vulnerability and possibly impending death "lends a welcome sense of uncertainty to the proceedings and helps keep the level of suspense consistently high throughout".

Although fantasy comes from an imaginative realm, Martin sees a real need to reflect the real world, where people sometimes die ugly deaths, even beloved people. The deaths of supernumerary extras or orcs have no major effect on readers, whereas a friend's death has much more emotional impact. Martin kills off main characters because he finds it very irritating to know early in the story who the hero will be, who will come through unscathed. Martin dislikes this lack of realism, comparing the situation to a soldier scared the night before a battle. Martin wants his readers to feel that no one is safe as they turn the page. Martin prefers a hero's sacrifice to say something profound about human nature, and points readers who do not want to get upset or disturbed to plenty of books for comfort reading.

"There is an inherent dishonesty to the sort of fantasy that too many people have done, where there's a giant war that rips the world apart, but no one that we know is ever really seriously inconvenienced by this. ... The heroes just breeze through [devastated villages], killing people at every hand, surviving those dire situations. There's a falsehood to that that troubles me."

— George R. R. Martin in an interview with Science Fiction Weekly in 2000

When choosing characters to die in battle scenes, Martin picks secondary or tertiary characters from the character lists without much thought, since he sees them as hardly developed and, in some cases, just names. However, the deaths and timing of many major characters were planned from the beginning, although these scenes may not always be easy to write. A scene called the "Red Wedding", which occurs about two-thirds through A Storm of Swords and leaves several major characters dead, was the hardest scene Martin had ever written. He repeatedly skipped writing the chapter and eventually wrote it last for A Storm of Swords. Readership response ranged from praise to condemnation, but Martin said the chapter "was painful to write; it should be painful to read, it should be a scene that rips your heart out, and fills you with terror and grief."

The wars in the novels are much more morally complex than a fight between good and evil. The novels reflect that wars have substantial death rates. The novels' attitude toward war is shaped by Martin's experiences with the controversies of the Vietnam War. As Martin was against the Vietnam War, the books reflect some of his views on war and violence and their costs. However, he endeavors to avoid using his characters as mouthpieces for his own personal diatribes.

Plot twists include the deaths of apparently crucial characters and the reappearances of characters believed to be dead. However, Rachael Brown of The Atlantic said that Martin's penchant for unpredictability may make the reader grow increasingly skeptical of apparent deaths, alluding to Jon Snow's fate in A Dance with Dragons. Martin believes that bringing back a dead character necessitates a transformative experience of the character. The body may be moving, but some aspect of the spirit is changed or lost. One character who has repeatedly returned from death is Beric Dondarrion, the Lightning Lord, and what happens to him echoes that of other revived characters: bits of his humanity and past lives are lost each time he returns from death. His flesh is falling away from him, but he remembers the mission he was sent to do before death.

== Sexuality ==
Considering sexuality an important driving force in human life that should not be excluded from the narrative, Martin equipped many of the Ice and Fire characters with a sex drive. Martin was also fascinated by medieval contrasts where knights venerated their ladies with poems and wore their favors in tournaments while their armies raped women in wartime.

The nonexistence of adolescence in the Middle Ages served as a model for Daenerys's sexual activity at the age of 13 in the books. Many high-born women were married at or below that age because the onset of sexual maturity supposedly turned children into adults. With the Targaryens, the novels also allude to the incestuous practices in the Ptolemaic dynasty of ancient Egypt to keep its bloodlines pure; but Martin also portrayed a sociopathic element in the incestuous relationship of the twins Cersei and Jaime Lannister, whose strong bonding inhibits their pairing with others whom they regard as inferior.

Martin wrote the novels' sex scenes in detail, "whether it's a great transcendent, exciting, mind blowing [sic?] sex, or whether it's disturbing, twisted, dark sex, or disappointing perfunctory sex". Martin blamed the American attitudes towards sex for some readers' offense with the novels' sex scenes, on the grounds that only a strong double standard explains the aversion to coitus in people undisturbed by descriptions of war. He also argued that the purpose of his narrative was rather to immerse the reader in the characters' experience, rather than to advance the plot.

Because of child pornography laws, the television adaptation was forced to either extenuate the sex scenes for the younger characters or age all characters up. HBO preferred the latter, adding some sex scenes to the TV series while leaving out others. The premiere of Game of Thrones was followed by many debates about the depiction of sex, rape, and female agency in the franchise. USA Today's assessment that HBO added "so many buxom, naked prostitutes that TV's Westeros makes Vegas look like a convent" earned Martin's reply that there were many brothels in the Middle Ages. Amber Taylor of The Atlantic saw the depiction of sex as one of the show's most distinctive aspects, "cheesy only insofar as sex is fundamentally absurd". Despite HBO's freedom to titillate viewers with sex and nudity, none of the show's sex scenes felt superfluous for her; some of Daenerys's TV scenes "make her vulnerability more real than any political exposition". Taylor also lauded HBO's "admirable choice ... that its nonconsensual sex scenes are deeply unarousing, in marked contrast with shows on other networks that use a historical setting as window dressing for prurient depictions of rape".

== Identity ==
The ideas about who characters are and what makes them who they are are a prominent theme throughout the series, becoming more central as it progresses. Point-of-view characters change their names, sometimes to the extent that they lose their identity in the chapter title. This is best exemplified by Arya Stark, who undergoes numerous identity changes as she travels from King's Landing to Braavos: Arya, Nymeria, Nan, "Salty", and "Cat of the Canals", among others. (Her chapters in A Dance with Dragons refer to her as "The Blind Girl" and "The Ugly Little Girl".) Martin says, "Arya has gone through a dozen different identities, even getting to Braavos—where the ultimate goal of the Faceless Men is to become no-one, and to be able to assume identities as one assumes a suit of clothes."

Arya is not the only character who changes their name or has their name changed for them. Her sister, Sansa Stark, adopts the identity of Alayne Stone. Tyrion Lannister goes by the names Yollo and Hugor Hill. Catelyn Stark becomes Lady Stoneheart. Theon Greyjoy's chapters in A Dance with Dragons are titled: "Reek", "The Prince of Winterfell", "The Turncloak", "A Ghost in Winterfell", and finally, "Theon" (again). Martin explains: "Identity is one of the things that I'm playing with in this series as a whole, and in this particular book—what is it that makes us who we are? Is it our birth, our blood, our position in the world? Or something more integral to us? Our values, our memories, et cetera."

== Feminism ==
Martin provides a variety of female characters to explore some of the ramifications of the novels being set in a patriarchal society. Martin says that he wrote all characters as human beings with the same basic needs, dreams and influences, and that his female characters are to cover the same wide spectrum of human traits like the males. Martin claims to identify with all point-of-view characters in the writing process despite significant differences to him, be it gender or age. He sees himself neither as misogynistic or a promoter of feminism, although he acknowledged that some values inoculated within childhood can never be fully abandoned, even those consciously rejected. He says that he appreciates the discussions whether the series is feminist or anti-feminist, and is very gratified of the many female readers and how much they like at least some of the female characters. He says that he does not presume to make feminist statements in either way. Martin's books frequently depict and refer to rape and humiliation, most cases of which are perpetrated upon women.

The Atlantic noted that Daenerys and Queen Cersei share the parallels of being forced into marriage, having powerful strengths of will, and being utterly ruthless toward their enemies. As bloodline and succession are the quickest and surest way to assert strength in Westeros, Cersei takes advantage of motherhood by procreating with her brother Jaime and having children fathered by her hated husband Robert aborted, thereby leaving him without a true heir in revenge. Martin said that Cersei's walk of public penitence in A Dance with Dragons may be read as misogynistic or feminist. Jane Shore, mistress of Edward IV, was punished similarly after Edward's death. Cersei is defined by her pride, and this punishment was directed at women to break their pride, but was never inflicted on men.

Critics addressed the series' portrayal of women after Game of Thrones began airing in 2011. Ginia Bellafante wrote in a piece from The New York Times that the series was "boy fiction patronizingly turned out to reach the population's other half" and considered it a "true perversion" that "all of this illicitness [in the TV series] has been tossed in as a little something for the ladies, out of a justifiable fear, perhaps, that no woman alive would watch otherwise". Although there may be women who read books like the Ice and Fire series, Bellafante said to never have "met a single woman who has stood up in indignation at her book club and refused to read the latest from Lorrie Moore unless everyone agreed to The Hobbit first". The article received so many responses that the New York Times had to close down the comments section.

Ilana Teitelbaum of The Huffington Post responded in an article called "Dear New York Times: A Game of Thrones Is Not Just for Boys", claiming that Bellafante's piece was not only rife with inaccuracies, but also patronizing to female readers. Teitelbaum defended the many sex scenes in the TV series because the books as a source sprawl with them. She encouraged discussion of the Ice and Fire books and the fantasy genre from a feminist perspective, but rejected Bellafante's point that only men are interested in fantasy, considering Bellafante's characterization of fantasy as "boy fiction" as a promotion of gender stereotyping offensive to the genre as well as to women. Scott Meslow of The Atlantic noted the need to differentiate between depicting misogyny and endorsing misogyny, as the series is set in a world in which sex is the primary means by which women can assert their power. Meslow states that although the TV series may sometimes toe the line between Skinimax-style exploitation and genuine plot advancement, the sexual scenes also invite the viewers to sympathize with the series' women.

== Religion ==
The novels show several competing religions, in imitation of religion's centrality to the Middle Ages, and to suit the author's perception of himself as a lapsed Catholic with atheist or agnostic habits. To evade the difficulty of inventing religions, George R. R. Martin based the series' major religions on real religious systems. The fictional history of Westeros shows how each religion evolved. Each of the religions reflects its culture's temperament.

According to James Poniewozik of Time magazine, no religion appears to be presented as the true faith, nor as the sole source of virtue. Implications stand that the different kinds of magic in the Ice and Fire world may be manifestations of the same forces, whereby readers can puzzle out the relation between the religions and the various magics; but the validity, teachings, and power of the competing religions in Ice and Fire, are left ambiguous, and Martin has said the series' gods are unlikely to appear as deus ex machina in Westeros.

=== Faith of the Seven ===
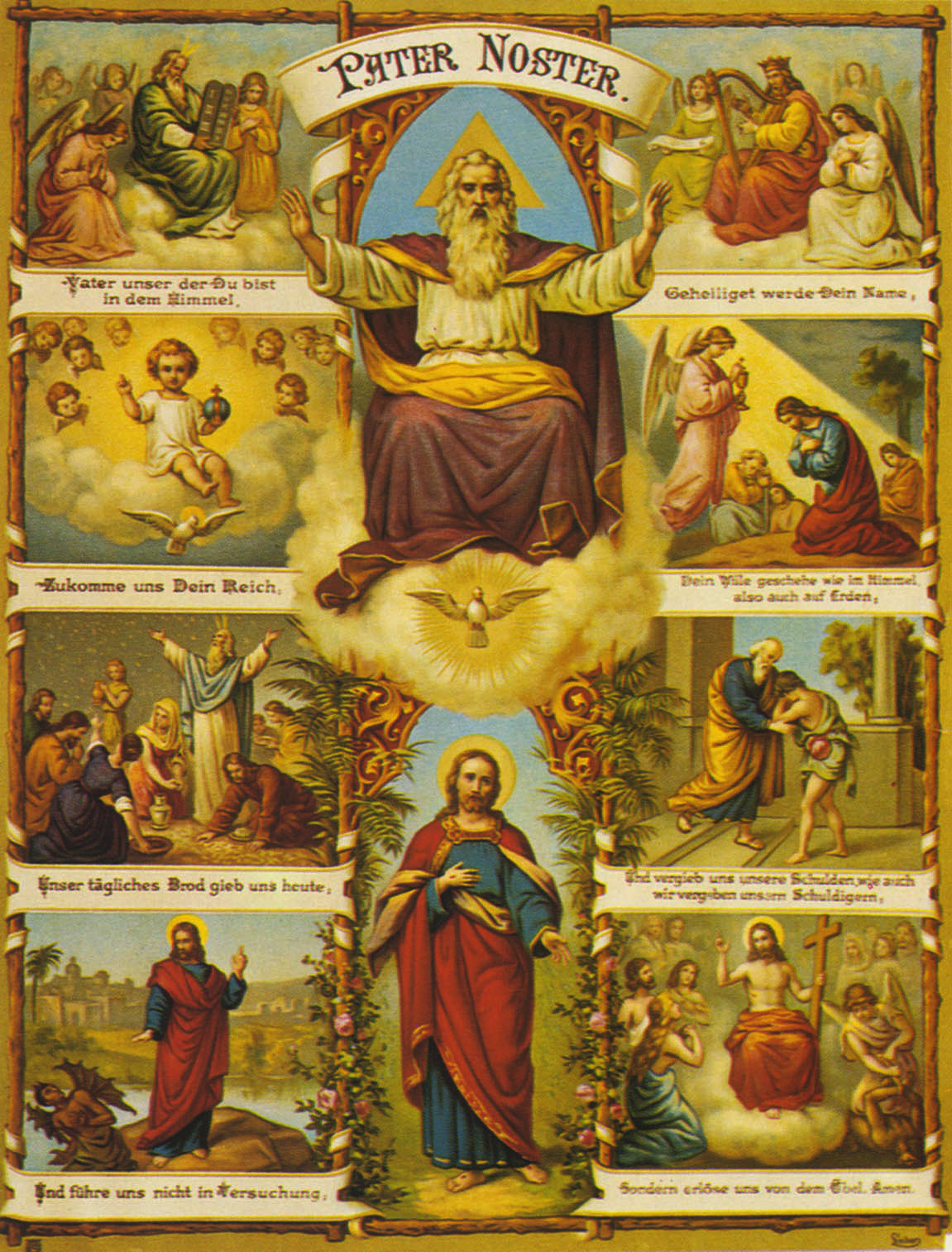
The series' Faith of the Seven was inspired by the Christian doctrine of the Trinity (Father, Son, and Holy Spirit, pictured).

The Faith of the Seven, often called simply "the Faith", is the predominant religion of the South of Westeros. Martin based the Faith on the medieval Roman Catholicism and the Christian doctrine of a Trinity composed of the Father, Son, and Holy Spirit. The Faith posits a Godhead composed of a single God with seven aspects or "faces", (Note: Thus making the Faith's theology of the Godhead heptaprosoponic.) similar to the Christian theology of modalism. The aspects of the Faith's God—referred to as "the Seven"—are the Father, Mother, Maiden, Crone, Smith, Warrior, and Stranger (resembling trinitarian Christianity's Father, Son, and Holy Spirit). According to Martin, the Mother, Maiden, and Crone were inspired by mystical views of womanhood, while the Father, Smith, and Warrior as traditional Christian masculine elements were added later. The Stranger, neither male nor female, represents mystery and death. The Mother is invoked for healthy childbirth, the Warrior for strength in battle, etc. The symbol of the Faith is a septagram (continuously drawn seven-pointed star).

Many of the objects and titles of the Faith draw their names from the Latin septem: a temple or edifice of the Faith is called a sept; and a priest of the Seven is called a septon (male) or septa (female). The Faith's hierarchy is also drawn from Catholicism. The Faith also has monks and nuns of various orders, of whom the Silent Sisters are the most prominent. In the fictional backstory, the Andals introduced the Faith of the Seven during their invasion of Westeros.

=== Old Gods ===
The Old Gods are nameless deities worshipped by the Northern population of Westeros, akin to "animism and traditional Pagan and various other Celtic systems and Norse systems". The fictional backstory gives the Children of the Forest as the origin of this religion, who worshipped trees, rocks, and streams when Westeros was still populated by many non-human races. Instead of temples, scriptures, or a formalized priestly caste, the Children of the Forest revered Weirwood trees (white trees with red leaves and red sap), which eventually became the center of their worship. When the First Men (human beings) came to Westeros from Essos, they accepted the Old Gods until the Andal Invasion converted the southern population of Westeros to the Faith of the Seven. Their descendants in the North still worship the Old Gods, while the godswoods of Southern noble houses remain as converted secular gardens.

=== Drowned God ===
The worship of the Drowned God is a local religion of the Iron Islands. According to its belief system, the Storm god submerged the Drowned God, who now lives in the sea, to which his worshippers' souls return after death. The native Ironborn, therefore, do not fear dying at sea or drowning but argue that "what is dead may never die, but rises again harder and stronger". In a ritual that Martin compared to baptism, the faithful are drowned in seawater and revived.

=== R'hllor ===
R'hllor, also known as the Red God and the Lord of Light, is a god worshipped primarily across the Narrow Sea, and his priests have only had a small presence in the Seven Kingdoms at the beginning of A Game of Thrones. This religion has a strong focus on prophecy and on ecstatic visions. The antithesis of R'hllor is the "Great Other": a god of ice, darkness, and death. According to Martin, this faith is roughly based upon Zoroastrianism and on the Gnostic Christian religion of Catharism of medieval Europe (annihilated during the Albigensian Crusade). In A Song of Ice and Fire, ancient prophecies suggest that the struggle between the two deities will come to a head when the messianic figure known as Azor Ahai wields the sword Lightbringer against the invasion of the Others (a superhuman species living north of Westeros). A prominent worshipper of R'hllor is the priestess Melisandre. In A Clash of Kings, Melisandre believes Stannis Baratheon to be Azor Ahai and influences him to convert to her faith.

=== Many-Faced God ===
The Many-Faced God, also referred to as Him of Many Faces, is a deity worshipped by a guild of assassins from the Free City of Braavos known as the Faceless Men.

The Faceless Men believe that all the slave population of Valyria prayed for deliverance to the same god of death, in different incarnations. In Qohor, the Many-Faced God is called the Black Goat of Qohor; in Yi Ti, the Lion of Night; and in the Faith of the Seven, the Stranger. The belief in a single god with many incarnations or 'faces' came to be reflected in the Guild's House of Black and White, which contains a public shrine with idols of many death gods, including the Stranger of the Faith of the Seven. The worshippers of the Many-Faced God believe that death is a merciful end to suffering. God may grant a 'gift' of death to those worthy. In the Guild's temple, those who seek an end to suffering may drink from a poisonous fountain.

=== Other religions ===
A Dance with Dragons explores the different religions of Westeros and Essos, identifying 17 different obscure religions. An Essos location named the Isle of the Gods also makes references to Roger Zelazny and H. P. Lovecraft, among others.

The god of death is an element of several religions in Westeros and Essos, on grounds from Martin that "worship of death is an interesting basis for religion because after all, death is the one universal. It doesn't seem to matter what gods you pray to. We all die in the real world and in fantasy worlds. So if there was one culture where you did not die, I suspect that God would become very popular. They will promise us eternal life, but whatever". He also stated the belief "that the world we live in was created by the evil god [is] kind of persuasive" when "you look at the world, particularly the Medieval world".

== Food ==
Food is such a central element in the Ice and Fire series that some critics have accused Martin of "gratuitous feasting". By fans' count, the first four novels name more than 160 dishes, ranging from peasant meals to royal feasts featuring camel, crocodile, singing squid, seagulls, lacquered ducks and spiny grubs. Adam Bruski of The Huffington Post said the vivid descriptions of food do not just lend color and flavor to the fictional world but almost appear as a supporting character. Some dishes have a foreshadowing nature or are particularly appropriate to the mood and temperament of their diners. Much of the realism of Martin's cultures comes through their unique foods and tastes. The meals signal everything from a character's disposition to plot developments, but also forebode the last profitable harvest before the coming winter. Inedible-sounding food was eaten at the Red Wedding in A Storm of Swords, preparing readers for the nauseating circumstances to come.
