= Corn Exchange, Ipswich =

Commercial building in Ipswich, Suffolk, England

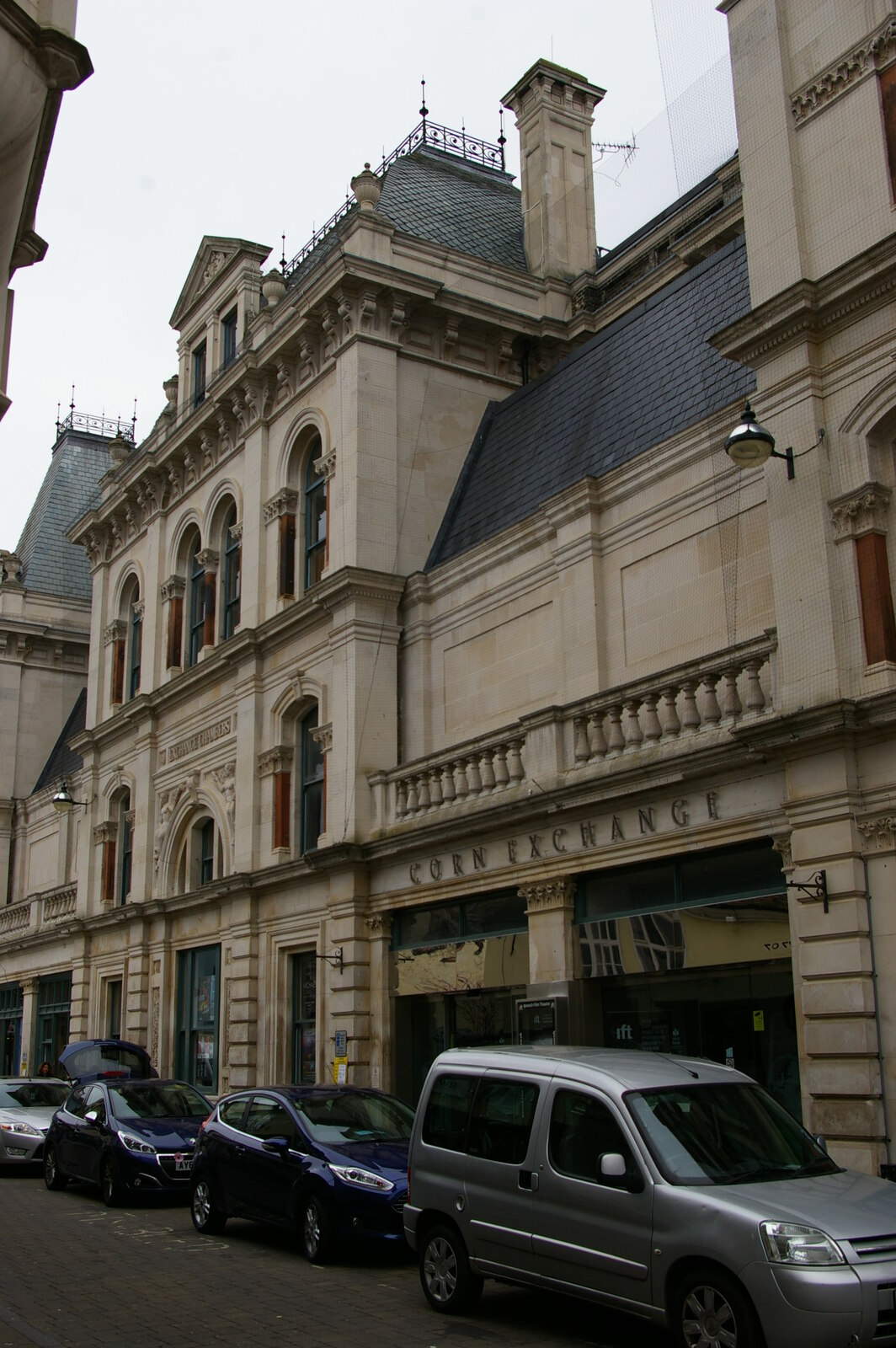
- Corn Exchange, Ipswich

- Shown in Suffolk
- 52.0575°N 1.1523°E
- Location: King Street, Ipswich

History
- Built: 1882

Site notes
- Architect: Brightwen Binyon
- Architectural style: Renaissance Revival style

Listed Building – Grade II
- Official name: Corn Exchange
- Designated: 4 August 1972
- Reference no.: 1374819

The Corn Exchange is a commercial building in King Street, Ipswich, Suffolk, England. The structure, which is currently used as a public events venue, is Grade II listed building.

== History ==
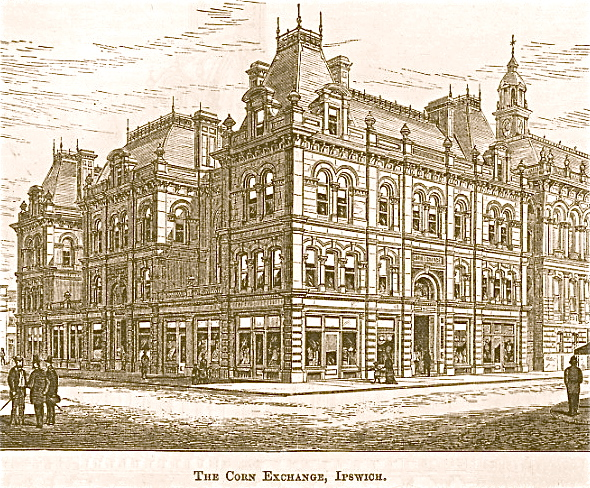
Corn Exchange, Ipswich, 1894

Until the early 19th century, corn merchants in the town traded in the open at stalls on the Cornhill. In 1793, some merchants relocated to The Rotunda, a building designed by George Gooding and modelled on the Halle aux blés in Paris. However, in the around 1810, Ipswich Borough Council decided to commission a purpose-built structure in the southeast corner of Cornhill. It was designed in the neoclassical style, built in ashlar stone at a cost of £33,000 and was completed in March 1812. It was originally open behind the façade, although a glass roof was added in 1849.

In the late 1860s, Ipswich Borough Council decided to commission a more substantial structure: the site they selected was on the north side of King Street. The foundation stone for the new building was laid by mayor, David Henry Booth, on 22 October 1880. It was designed by Brightwen Binyon in the Renaissance Revival style, built in ashlar stone at a cost of £25,000 and was officially opened by the then-mayor, Frederick Fish, on 26 July 1882.

The design involved a symmetrical main frontage of nine bays facing onto King Street with the end bays slightly projected forward. The central section of three bays, which was also slightly projected forward, was fenestrated by a central tripartite window flanked by single sash windows with architraves on the ground floor, a central Diocletian window flanked by segmental headed windows with architraves and Corinthian order columns on the first floor, and a pair of round headed windows with Corinthian order columns flanked by single round headed windows also with Corinthian order columns on the second floor. The bays were flanked by full-height pilasters supporting a modillioned cornice. The wing sections of two bays each featured wide openings separated by Corinthian order pilasters on the ground floor and balustraded parapets placed in front of recessed blind walls on the first floor. The end bays were fenestrated in a similar manner to the central section. Above the cornice the central section and end bays featured dormer windows and mansard roofs. Internally, the principal room was a Grand Hall.

The use of the building as a corn exchange declined significantly in the wake of the Great Depression of British Agriculture in the late 19th century. Instead, it became a public events venue: early speakers included the President of the Board of Trade, Joseph Chamberlain, in January 1885.

Following a major programme of restoration works costing £800,000, the building was re-opened by Prince Richard, Duke of Gloucester on 22 September 1975. The building hosted the Antiques Roadshow in March 1986, and the rock band, Blur, in June 1991. It was also the venue for the political debate programme, Question Time, in May 2013 and, again, in May 2016.

== See also ==
- Corn exchanges in England
