= King station =

King station may refer to:

== Transportation ==
- King station (Toronto), a subway station in Toronto, Ontario, Canada
- King Albert Park MRT station, a rapid transit station in Bukit Timah, Singapore
- King Baudouin metro station, a rapid transit station in Brussels, Belgium
- King City GO Station, a commuter rail and bus station in King City, Ontario, Canada
- King Drive station, an "L" station in Chicago, Illinois, United States
- King Edward station, a rapid transit station in Vancouver, British Columbia, Canada
- King George station, a rapid transit station in Surrey, British Columbia, Canada
- King George Square busway station, a transit station in Brisbane, Australia
- King George V DLR station, a light metro station in North Woolwich, East London, England
- King Manor station, a former name for DeKalb Street station, a light rapid transit station in Pennsylvania, United States
- King Memorial station, a rapid transit station in Atlanta, Georgia, United States
- King William Street tube station, a former Underground station in London, England
- King's Circle railway station, a suburban railway station in Mumbai, India
- King's Cross station, a complex of three adjacent stations in London, England
- Kings Cross railway station, Sydney, a suburban railway station in New South Wales, Australia
- King's Lynn railway station, a railway station in King's Lynn, Norfolk, England
- 2nd and King station, a light rail station in San Francisco, California, United States
- Lai King station, a rapid transit station in Kwai Tsing District, Hong Kong
- Mackenzie King station, a bus rapid transit station in Ottawa, Ontario, Canada

== Other uses ==
- King's Station, a former stagecoach station in San Francisquito Canyon, California, United States
- King City weather radar station, is an Environment Canada site in King City, Ontario, Canada
- King Salmon Air Force Station, a former United States Air Force radar station near King Salmon, Alaska, United States
- King Sejong Station, a Korean research station on the Barton Peninsula, King George Island, Antarctica
- Crown King Ranger Station, a ranger station near the top of Crown King Mountain, Arizona, United States
- Storm King Ranger Station, a ranger station near Barnes Point, Washington, United States

== See also ==
- Martin Luther King station (disambiguation)
- King Street station (disambiguation)
- King (disambiguation)
