= King of the North =

King of the North or King in the North may refer to:

== Kings ==
- Domnall mac Áeda Muindeirg (died 804), chief of the Cenél Conaill of the northern Uí Néill in modern County Donegal, Ireland
- The king named in Daniel's final vision
- King in the North, a title used in Game of Thrones
- The King in the North: The Life and Times of Oswald of Northumbria Max Adams (2013)

== Nickname ==
- Andy Burnham (born 1970), Prime Minister of the United Kingdom since 2026; Mayor of Greater Manchester from 2017 to 2026
- Antoine Labelle (1833–1891), a Roman Catholic priest involved in the settlement of the Laurentians, Quebec, Canada

== Other uses ==
- King of the North (album), 2017 EP by UK rapper Bugzy Malone; sometimes referred to as "King in the North"
- "King in the North", an episode of the American television show Fresh Off the Boat
