= Susquehanna–Dauphin station =

Rapid transit station in Philadelphia

Susquehanna–Dauphin
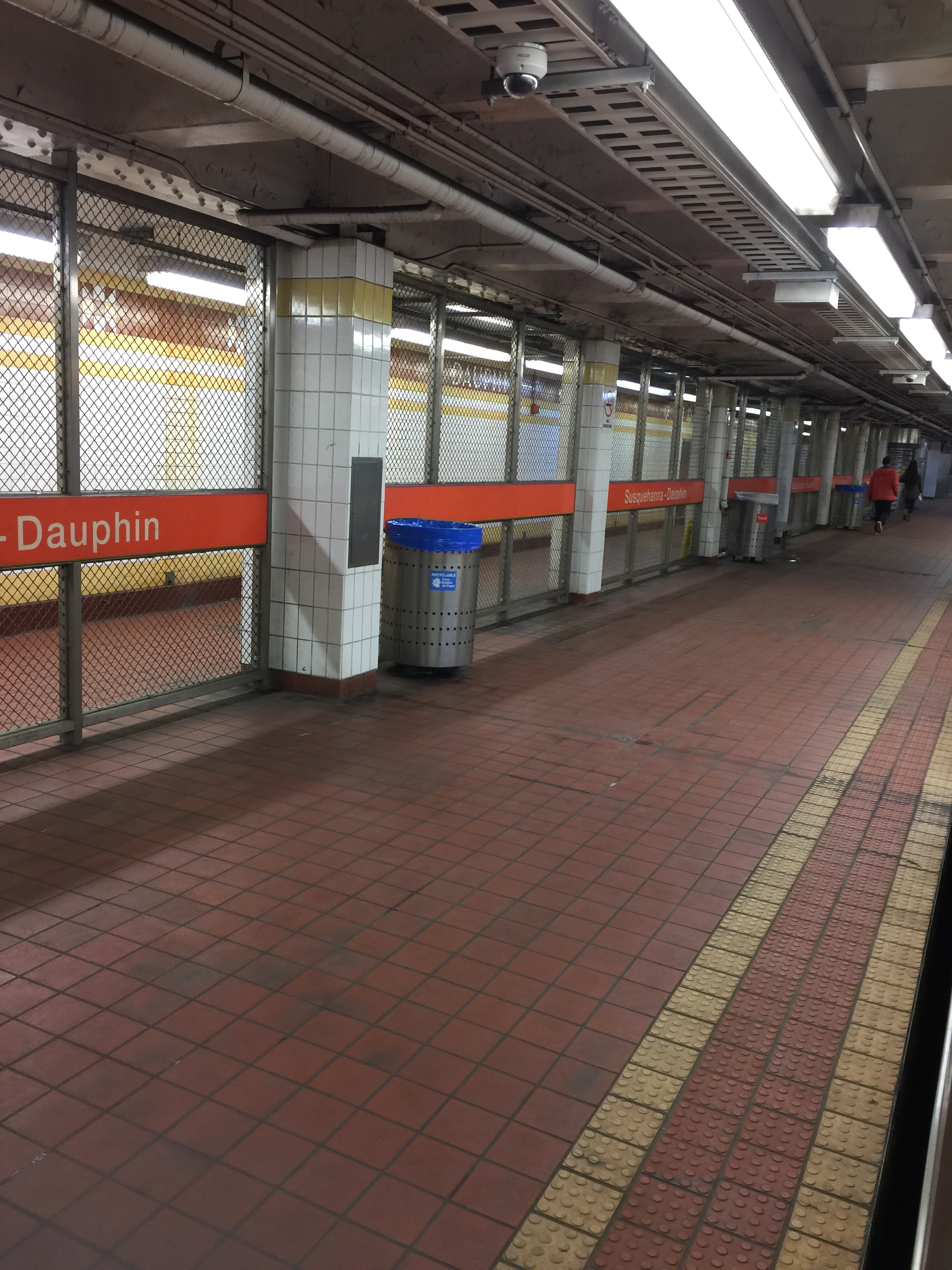
- Susquehanna–Dauphin station platform

General information
- Location: 2200 North Broad Street; Philadelphia, Pennsylvania
- Coordinates: 39°59′11″N 75°9′23″W
- Owner: City of Philadelphia
- Operator: SEPTA
- Platforms: 2 side platforms
- Tracks: 4
- Connections: SEPTA City Bus: 4, 16, 39

Construction
- Structure type: Underground
- Accessible: Yes

History
- Opened: September 1, 1928
- Former names: Dauphin–Susquehanna (1928–1978)

Services
| Preceding station | SEPTA Metro | Following station |
|---|---|---|
| Cecil B. Moore toward NRG Station | B (SEPTA Metro) | North Philadelphia toward Fern Rock T.C. |
and do not stop here
Location

Susquehanna–Dauphin station is a subway station on the SEPTA Metro B in Philadelphia, Pennsylvania. The station is located at the 2200 block of North Broad Street in North Philadelphia, between Susquehanna Avenue at the south end and Dauphin Street at the north end. Four tracks travel through the station, however the station is only served by local trains, which travel on the outer two tracks. Along with Cecil B. Moore station, this stop provides access to Temple University, which is located one block south of Susquehanna Avenue. Service began at the station, formerly known as Dauphin–Susquehanna, on September 1, 1928, as part of the original segment of the Broad Street Line, which ran from City Hall station to Olney station.

Until February 25, 1956, Trolley Routes 8 and 39 (now a bus line) service as the stations connections which travels westbound on Susquehanna Avenue to the Strawberry Mansion neighborhood, and eastbound on Dauphin Street to the Kensington neighborhood.

== Station layout ==
Fares are collected at the center of the platforms on each side of the tracks, as there is no crossover built at this station.

== Station mural ==
The station features a mural entitled City Diary, created by Philadelphia children in 1997. The mural consists of many 8 in^{2} (20.32 cm^{2}) ceramic tiles, split into two pieces on opposite sides of the station, with lengths of 28 ft (8.53 m) and 19 ft (5.79 m), respectively. Over 170 children between the ages of 6 and 16 contributed to the project, which was dedicated to the station on June 11, 1997.

== Gallery ==
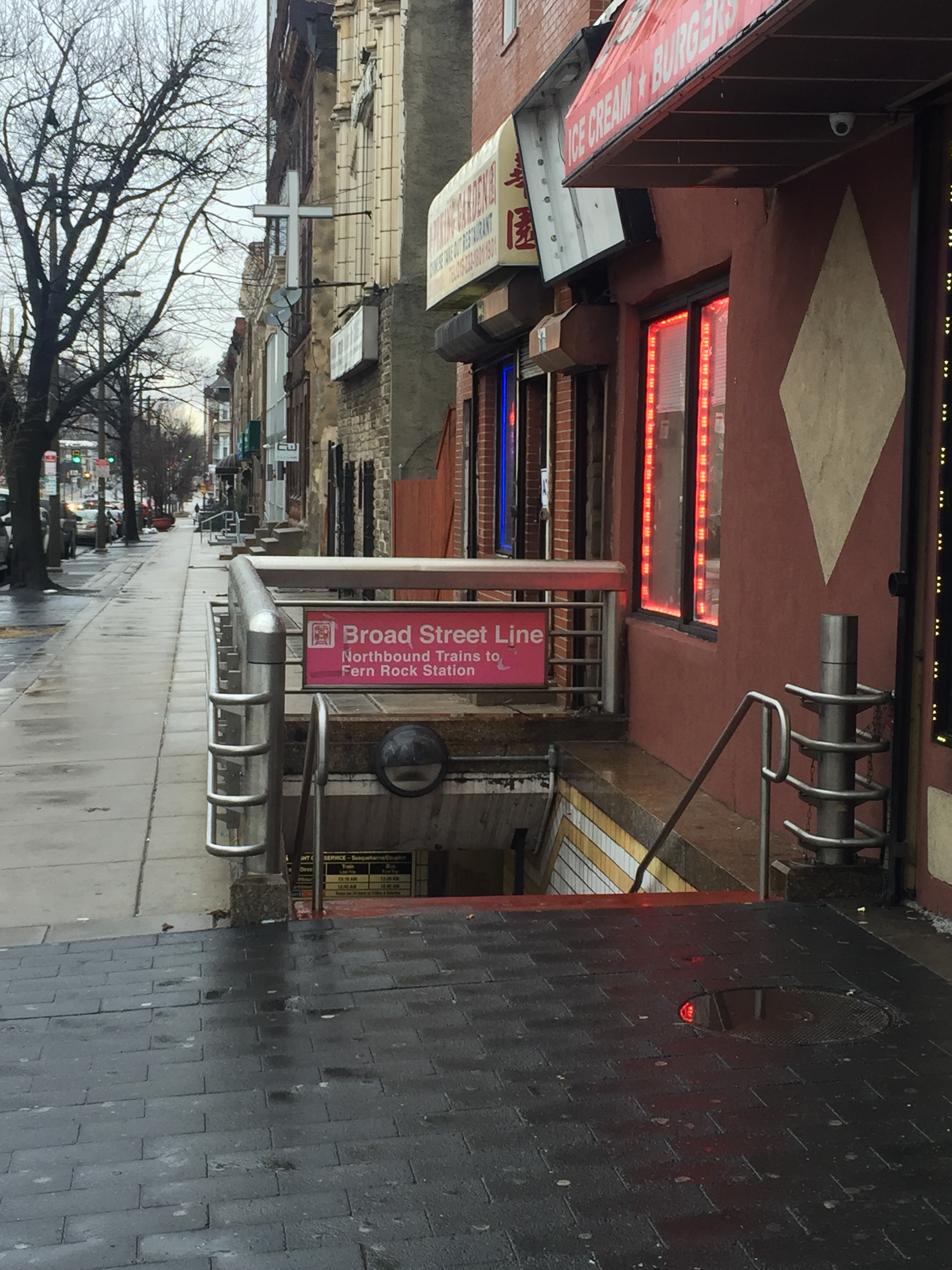
Station entrance

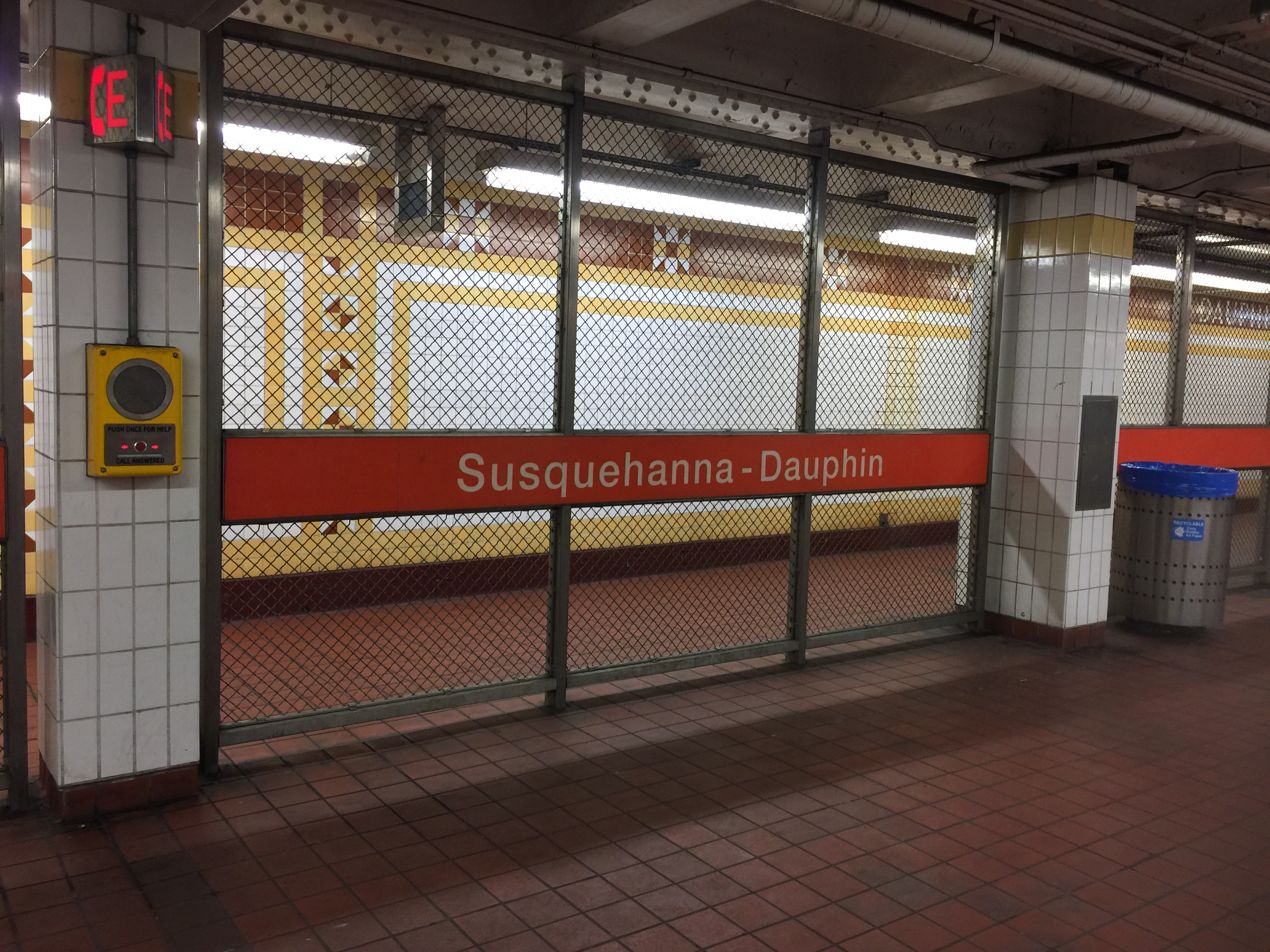
Platform south

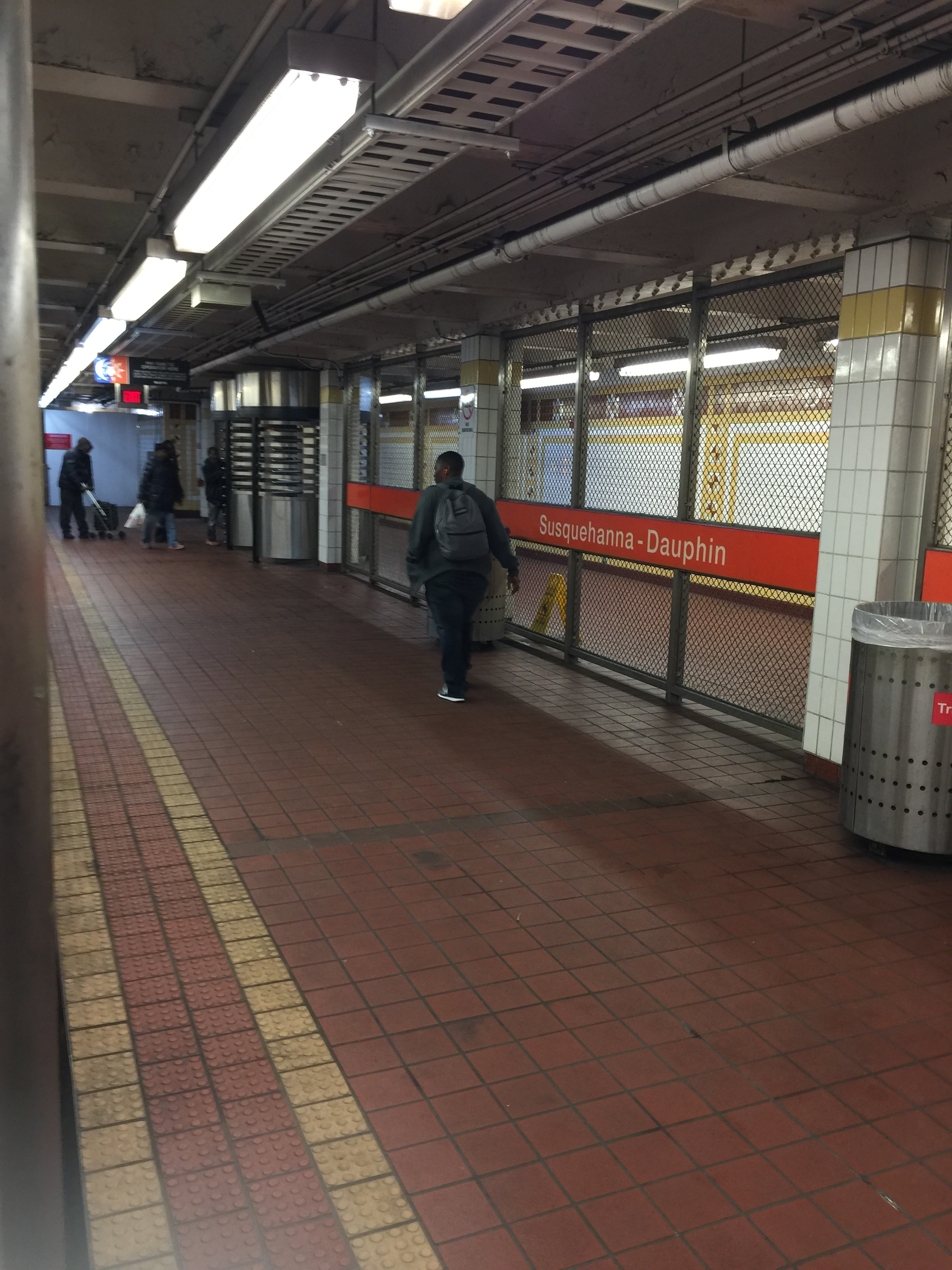
Platform north

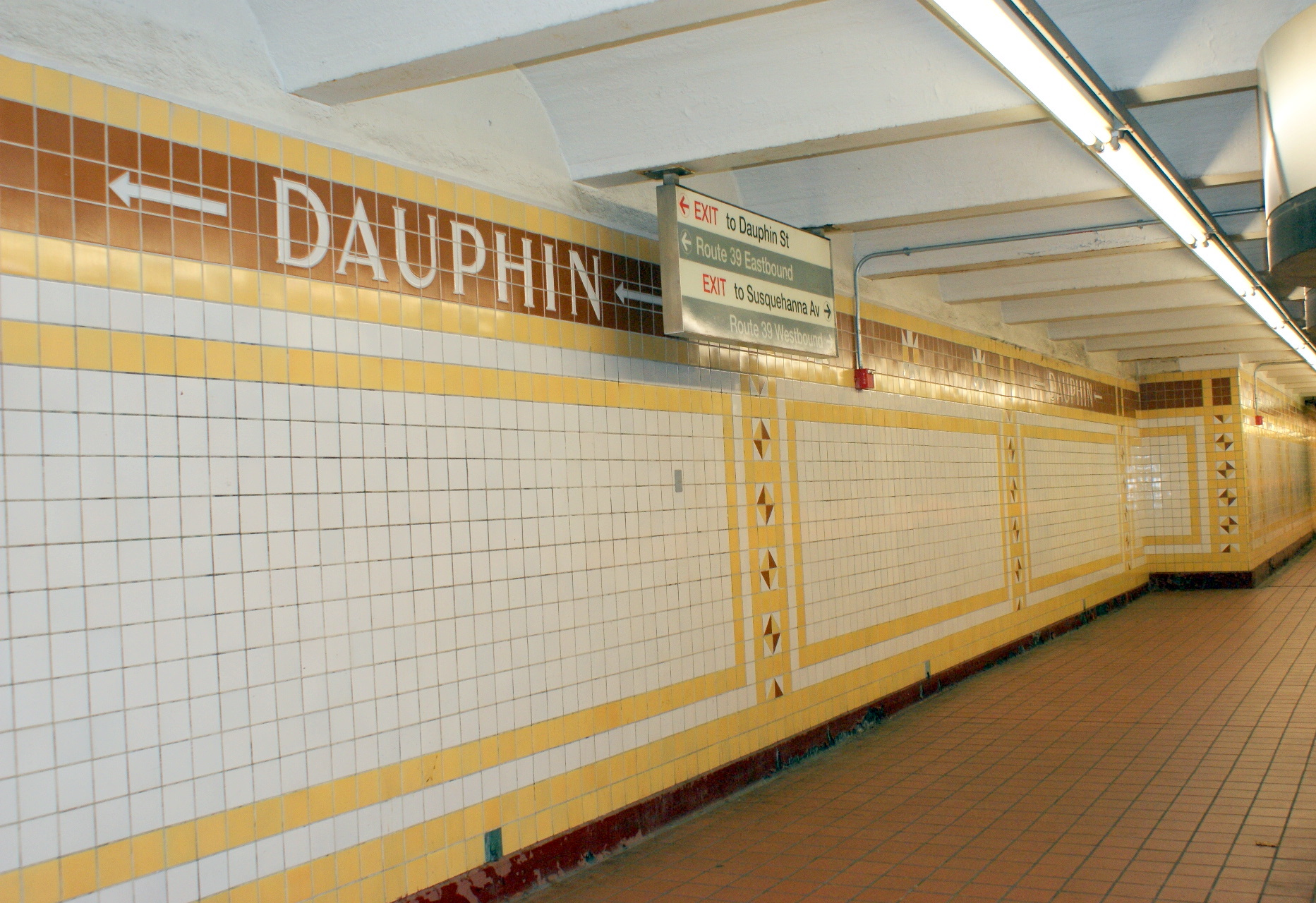
The platform of the Susquehanna–Dauphin Station

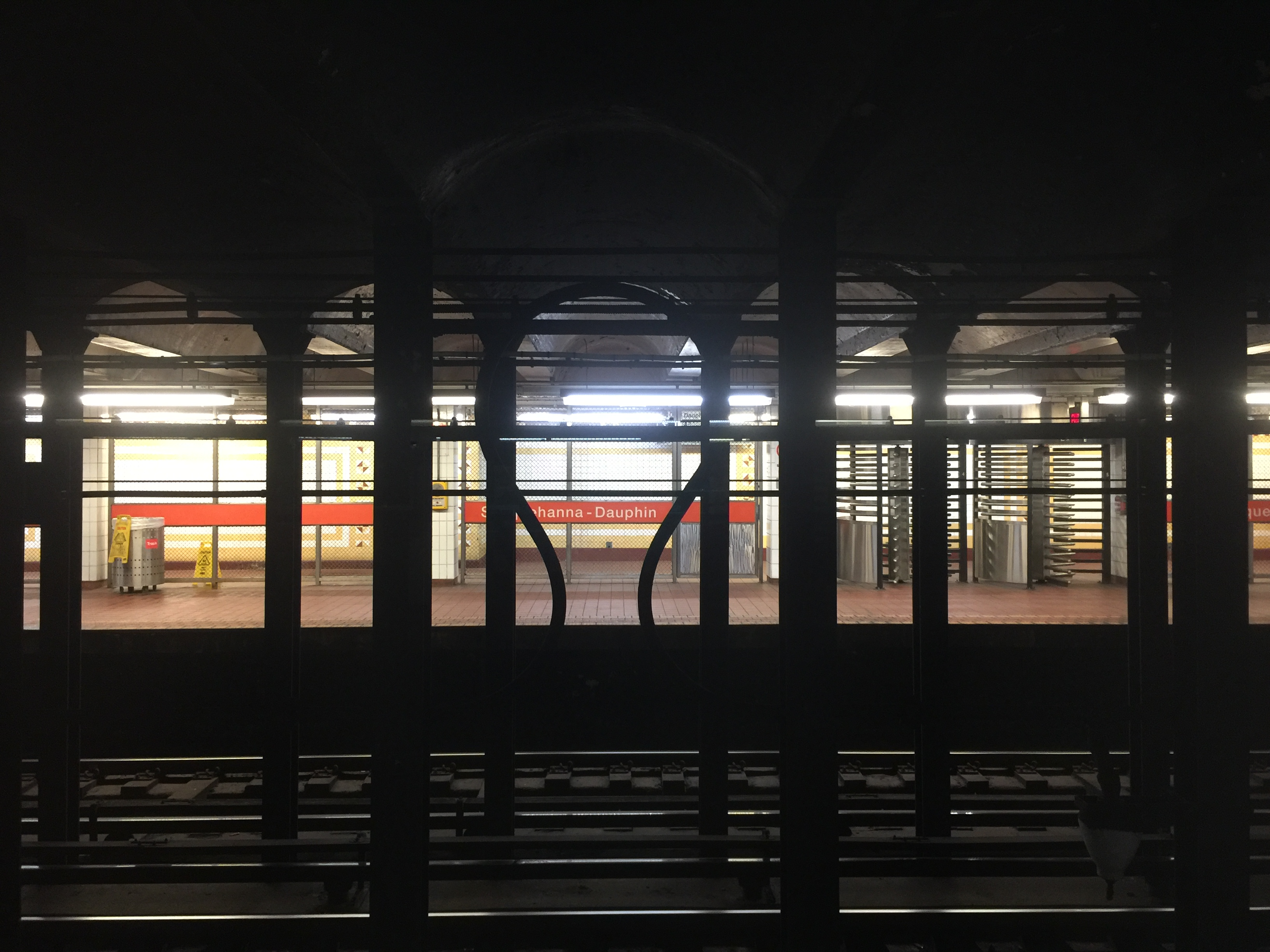
Center tracks
