= King (given name) =

King is the given name or nickname of:

== Given name ==
- King Ambers (born 1999), Canadian football player
- King Baggot (1879–1948), American actor, director and screenwriter
- King Bruce (1922–1997), Ghanaian musician
- King C. Gillette (1855–1932), American businessman
- King Fisher (1854–1884), American Old West gunslinger
- King Floyd (1945–2006), American soul singer and songwriter
- King Green (born 1986), American professional mixed martial artist
- King Lysen (1942–2017), American politician
- King Mack (born 2004), American football player
- King O'Malley (1854–1953), Australian politician
- King Parsons (born 1949), American professional wrestler
- King Rice (born 1968), American basketball coach and former player
- King G. Staples (1851–1910), American politician
- King Vidor (1894–1982), American film director, producer and screenwriter

== Nickname ==
- King Clancy (1903–1986), Canadian ice hockey player, coach, and executive
- King Kelly (1857–1894), American baseball player and manager
- King Moody (1929–2001), American actor and comedian
- King Oliver (1885–1938), African-American jazz cornet player and bandleader

== Fictional characters ==
- King Bradley, a main antagonist in the anime/manga series Fullmetal Alchemist
- King Dedede, in the Kirby video game franchise
- King Hippo, a boxer from the Punch-Out!! video game franchise
- King K. Rool, the main antagonist in Nintendo's Donkey Kong video game franchise
- King Clawthorne, one of the main characters of the animated series The Owl House
- King Kong, a giant monster resembling a gorilla
