= King Street Bridge =

King Street Bridge may refer to:

- King Street Bridge (Melbourne), Australia
- King Street Bridge (Toronto), Canada
- King Street Overhead Bridge, Kings Mountain, Cleveland County, North Carolina, US
