= King Township, Oregon County, Missouri =

Township in Oregon County, Missouri, U.S.

Coordinates: 36.7789°N 91.1881°W

King Township is an inactive township in Oregon County, in the U.S. state of Missouri.

King Township has the name of Robert A. King, a pioneer citizen.
