= King Street, Ipswich =

Street in Ipswich, Suffolk, England

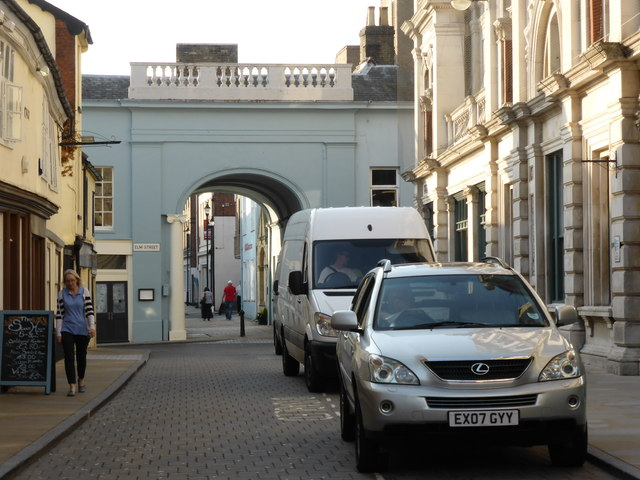
King Street in 2014

King Street is a street in central Ipswich, Suffolk, England.

== Historic name of King Street ==
The name "King Street" has been used for several streets in Ipswich. It appears in John Speed's 1610 map. In Joseph Pennington's map of 1778, the street leading down from Cornhill to the corner of the Corn Exchange was labelled King Street, whereas the road from the Arcade to the same corner – now known as King Street was called "Little King Street". According to White's 1867 map of Ipswich, the road is still labelled "Little King Street". However following the building of Ipswich Town Hall in 1868, Ipswich Corporation bought the former public houses, the King's Head and the Sickle, and proceed to build the Corn Exchange which opened in 1882. The Mutual building on the corner with Princes Street was originally Parr's Bank and is a Grade II listed building.

== Notable buildings in King Street ==
King Street is part of Ipswich Borough Council's Central Conservation Area. Their aerial appraisal highlights the Corn Exchange, the Swan Public House and the Arcade Street Arch. In 1972 the Corn Exchange was converted into an entertainment facility. The King Street Cinema, the only independent cinema in Ipswich is located here. It provides two screens in the Corn Exchange, Ipswich, and screens independent and world cinema films which fall outside mainstream cinema.

== Grade II listed buildings ==
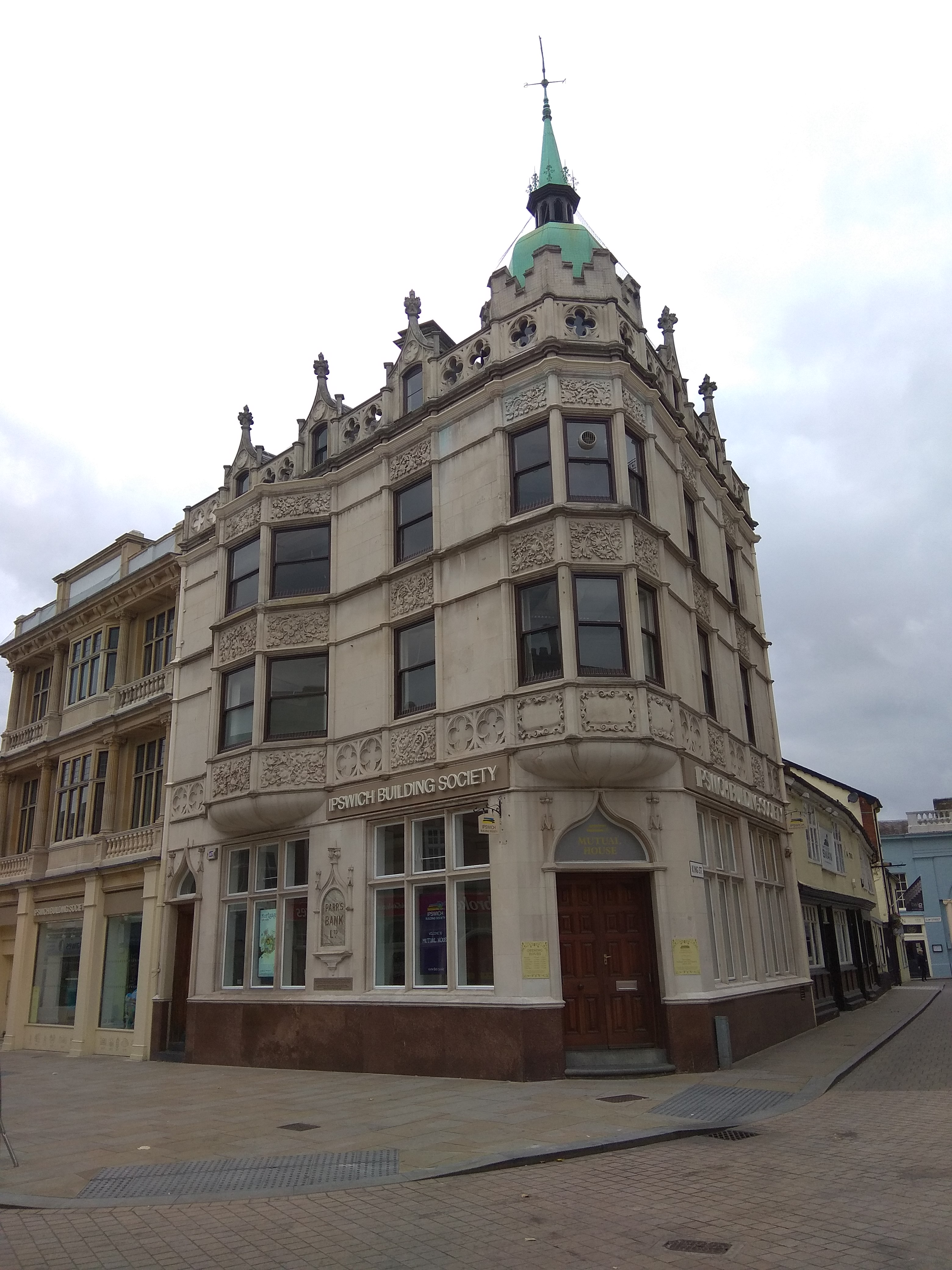
Parr's Bank

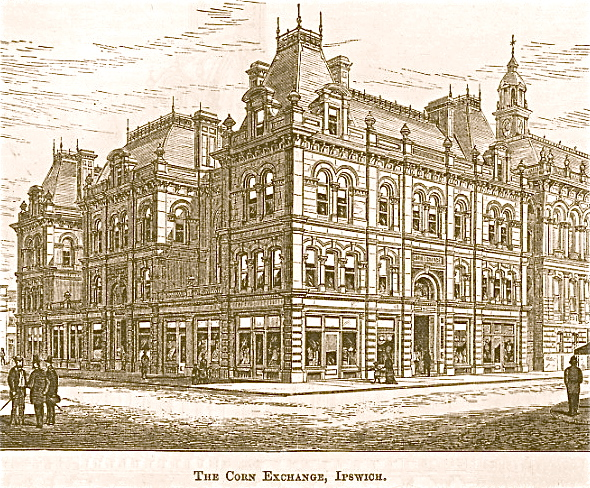
Ipswich Corn Exchange (1894)

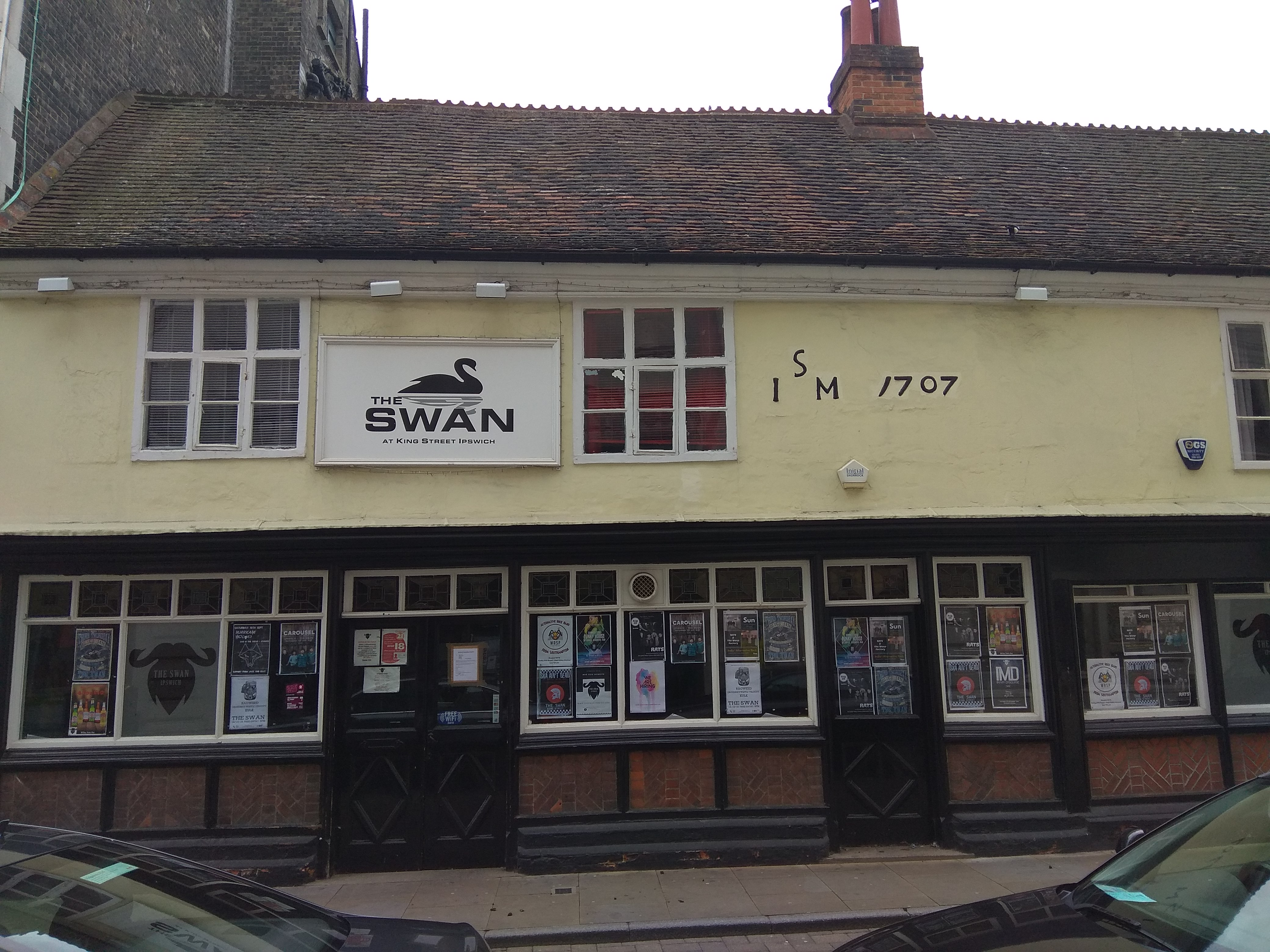
Swann Public House

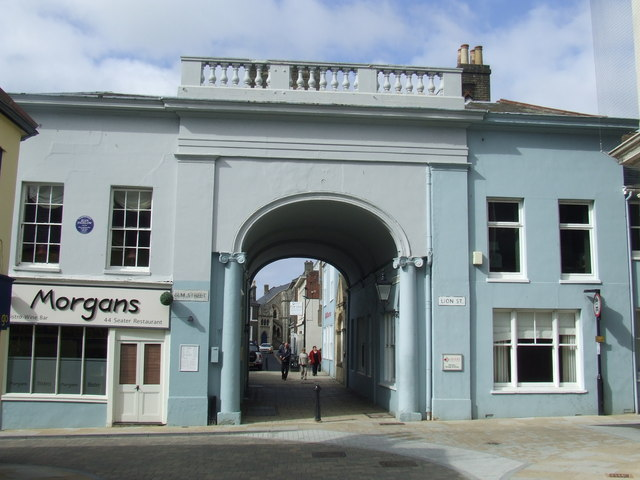
Arcade Street arch viewed from King Street
