= King Range =

King Range may refer to:

- King Range (Antarctica), a mountain range in Victoria Land, Antarctica
- King Range (California), a mountain range in Humboldt County, California, part of the California Coast Ranges
