= King Hollow =

Valley in Tennessee, United States

Coordinates: 35.672684°N 87.679554°W

King Hollow is a valley in Hickman County, Tennessee in the United States.

King Hollow was named for a pioneer named King who settled there in 1815.
