= King, Wetzel County, West Virginia =

King
- Unincorporated community
- Location within the state of West Virginia King (the United States)
- Coordinates: 39°0′4″N 80°40′53″W
- Country: United States
- State: West Virginia
- County: Wetzel
- Elevation: 840 ft (260 m)
- Time zone: UTC-5 (Eastern (EST))
  - Summer (DST): UTC-4 (EDT)
- GNIS ID: 1554879

King is an unincorporated community in Wetzel County, West Virginia, United States.
