= King in the North =

Fictional royal title in A Song of Ice and Fire

King in the North is a fictional title used in George R. R. Martin's A Song of Ice and Fire series of novels and the HBO television adaptation Game of Thrones, given to the King of the sovereign northern kingdom in Westeros. It is distinct from the similar title Warden of the North, held by the vassal of the Lord of the Seven Kingdoms.

In the television series, while the independence of the North is never recognised by the Baratheon/Lannister monarchs, Robb Stark (season 1) and Jon Snow (season 6) are each proclaimed King in the North by the Northern lords. In season 8, Sansa Stark officially becomes Queen in the North.

The King in the North reference attracted some attention in the United Kingdom during June 2026 when Andy Burnham was being discussed as the next prime minister, due to his prior role as mayor of the city of Manchester, in the north of England.
