= The King (nickname) =

The King is a nickname. Notable people with the nickname include:

- Kingsley Amis (1922–1995), British novelist
- Zohar Argov (1955–1987), Israeli singer
- Babar Azam (born 1994), Pakistani cricketer
- Melvin Belli (1905–1996) American attorney "The King of Torts"
- Kenny Bernstein (born 1944), American drag racing driver, nicknamed "The King of Speed"
- Ole Einar Bjørndalen (born 1974), Norwegian biathlete, nicknamed "The King of Biathlon"
- James Brown (Elvis impersonator) (born 1968), Elvis impersonator
- Andy Burnham (born 1970), British prime minister and former mayor of Manchester, nicknamed the "King of the North"
- Eric Cantona (born 1966), French footballer
- Wayne Carey (born 1971), Australian rules footballer
- Johnny Carson (1925-2005), American comedian and talk show host, nicknamed "The King of Late Night"
- Kenny Dalglish (born 1951), Scottish football player and manager
- Clark Gable (1901–1960), American movie star "The King of Hollywood"
- Benny Goodman (1909–1986), American entertainer, nicknamed "The King of Swing"
- John Gutfreund (1929 - 2016), American banker, nicknamed the "King of Wall Street"
- Gheorghe Hagi (born 1965), Romanian footballer
- Derrick Henry (born 1994), American football player nicknamed "King Henry"
- Félix Hernández (born 1986), American baseball pitcher
- Michael Jackson (1958–2009), American singer and pop icon, nicknamed "The King of Pop"
- LeBron James (born 1984), American basketball player, nicknamed "King James"
- Barry John (born 1945), Welsh rugby player
- Graham Kennedy (1934–2005), Australian television performer
- Shah Rukh Khan (born 1965), Indian actor, nicknamed "King Khan"
- B. B. King (1925–2015), nicknamed "The King of the Blues" and considered one of the "Three Kings of the Blues Guitar"
- Martin Luther King Jr. (1929–1968), civil rights activist
- Richard Kingsmill (born 1964), Australian radio host
- Jack Kirby (1917–1994), American comics artist
- Virat Kohli (born 1988), Indian cricketer, nicknamed "King Kohli"
- Denis Law (born 1940), Scottish footballer
- Jerry Lawler (born 1949), American professional wrestler
- King Levinsky (1910–1991), American heavyweight boxer
- Wally Lewis (born 1959), Australian rugby league player
- Jari Litmanen (born 1971), Finnish footballer
- Henrik Lundqvist (born 1982), NHL Goalie of the New York Rangers
- Hugh McElhenny (1928–2022), NFL Hall of Fame running back "The King"
- Michael Milken (born 1946), American financier, nicknamed the "Junk Bond King"
- Mohamed Mounir (born 1954), Egyptian singer
- Nagarjuna (actor) (born 1959), Indian actor, nicknamed "King"
- Eli Ohana, nicknamed the King (born 1964), Israeli soccer coach and manager
- Arnold Palmer (1929–2016), American golfer
- Pelé (1940–2022), Brazilian footballer
- Richard Petty (born 1937), American NASCAR driver
- Fernando Poe Jr. (1939–2004), Philippine actor and National Artist nicknamed "Da King"
- Elvis Presley (1935–1977), American entertainer, "The King of Rock and Roll"
- Henry Shefflin (born 1979), Kilkenny hurler
- George Strait (born 1952), American entertainer and country music icon "The King of Country"
- Tom Cato Visnes, Norwegian musician and teacher
- Jan-Ove Waldner (born 1965), table tennis player
- Bob Wills (1905–1975), Country Western entertainer "The King of Western Swing"
- Jimmy Zámbó (1958-2001), Hungarian pop singer
