= Cecil (given name) =

- Gender: Unisex
- Language: Welsh, English

Origin
- Language: Old Welsh
- Origin: Anglicisation of Seisyllt
- Region of origin: Wales

Other names
- Related names: Cecilia, Cecily

Cecil is a given name of Welsh origin.

The name was associated with Monmouthshire and derives from the Old Welsh personal name Seisyllt. The name may be related to that of the local Celtic tribe (the Silures) and the successor kingdom (Essyllwg).

Notable people with the given name include:

== Notable men with the given name ==
- Cecil Banes-Walker (1888–1915), English cricketer
- Cecil A. Beasley (1876–1959), American lawyer and politician
- Cecil Beaton (1904–1980), English photographer
- Cecil Boyd-Rochfort (1887–1983), British racehorse trainer
- Cecil Brooks III (born 1961), American drummer
- C. T. Caldera, Chief of Staff of the Sri Lanka Army from 1976-1977
- Cecil Calvert (disambiguation), several people
- Cecil Clarke (born 1968), Canadian politician
- Cecil Clementi (1875–1947), Governor of Hong Kong, British colonial administrator
- Cecil Clementi Smith (1840–1916), British colonial administrator
- Cec Cooper (1926–2010), Australian professional rugby league footballer and coach
- Cecil Cooper (born 1949), American baseball player and manager
- Cecil Cooper (bishop) (1882–1964), English-Korean bishop
- Cecil Cooper (priest) (1871–1942), British priest and dean
- Cecil Day-Lewis (1904–1972), Anglo-Irish poet
- Cecil B. DeMille (1881–1959), American film director and film producer
- Cecil Dolecheck (born 1951), American politician from Iowa
- Cecil Kent Drinker (1887-1956), American physiologist, professor and occupational hygiene expert
- Cecil Duncan (1893–1979), Canadian ice hockey administrator
- Cecil Fielder (born 1963), American baseball player
- Cecil Gordon (1941–2012), American racecar driver
- Cecil Grigg (1891–1968), American football player
- Cecil Harcourt (1892–1959), British military officer
- Cecil Heftel (1924–2010), American politician in Hawaii
- Cecil Humphery-Smith (1928–2021), British genealogist and heraldist
- Cecil Irwin (musician) (1902–1935), American jazz reed player and arranger
- Cecil Irwin (footballer) (1942–2025), English footballer
- Cecil E. Johnson (1888–1955), Chief Justice of the Arkansas Supreme Court
- Cecil Kaiser (1916–2011), American baseball player
- Cecil Kellaway (1890–1973), British-South African actor
- Cecil Kirk (died 1944), American politician from Maryland
- Cecil Leonard (1946–2020), American football player
- Cecil Mamiit (born 1977), American tennis player representing the Philippines
- Cecil McBee (born 1935), American jazz bassist
- Cecil Moore (disambiguation), several people
- Cecil Mountford (1919–2009), New Zealand rugby league footballer and coach
- Cecil Parker (1897–1971), English character and comedy actor
- Cecil Parkinson (1931–2016), British politician
- Cecil Payne (1922–2007), American saxophonist
- Cecil Polhill (1860–1938), British missionary
- Cecil Potter (1888–1975), former professional manager
- Cecil Frank Powell (1903–1969), British physicist
- Cecil Purdy (1906–1979), Australian chess player
- Cecil Rawle (1891-1938), Politician from Dominica
- Cecil Rhodes (1853–1902), British imperialist and businessman
- Cecil Saint-Laurent, the nom de plume of Jacques Laurent (1919–2000), French writer and journalist
- Cecil Sandford (1928–2023), British motorcycle racer
- Cecil Sandford (footballer) (1874–1946), Australian rules footballer
- Cecil Sharp (1859–1924), English folk-song collector
- Cecil Spring Rice (1859–1918), British diplomat
- Cecil Clyde Squier (died 1951), American politician from Maryland
- Cecil W. Stoughton (1920–2008), American photographer
- Cecil Taylor (1929–2018), American pianist and poet
- Cecil Taylor (playwright) (1929–1981), Scottish playwright
- Cecil Tyndale-Biscoe (1863–1949), British missionary and educationalist, working in Kashmir
- Cecil Waidyaratne (1938–2001), Sri Lankan military officer
- Cecil Williamson (1909–1999), English screenwriter, film editor, film director and Neopagan warlock
- Cecil Womack (1947–2013), American singer-songwriter and record producer
- Cecil Charles Worster-Drought (1888–1971), English physician
- Charles Cecil Stevens (1840–1909), British civil servant, lieutenant governor of Bengal

== Notable women with the given name ==
- Cecil Aldana (born 2003), Cuban footballer
- Cecil Frances Alexander (1818–1895), Irish hymnist
- Cecil Arden (1894–1989), American opera singer
- Cecil Adair (1856–1932), English novelist
- Cecil Bødker (1927–2020), Danish writer
- Cecil Tremayne Buller (1886–1973), Canadian artist
- Cecil Cowles (1893–1968), American pianist and composer
- Cecil Cunningham (1888–1959), American actress
- Cecil Curle (1901–1987), Scottish archaeologist and art historian
- Cecil Castellucci (born 1969), American writer and musician
- Cecil Craig, Viscountess Craigavon (1883–1960), British Unionist activist and politician
- Cecil Charles, American writer, translator and newspaper journalist
- Cecil Dawkins (1927–2019), American author
- Cecil de Cardonnel, 2nd Baroness Dynevor (1735–1793), Welsh peeress
- Cecil Dorrian (1882–1926), One of women accredited as AEF correspondents in WWI
- Cecil M. Harden (1894–1984), American educator and politician
- Cecil Higgs (1898–1986), South African artist
- Cecil Hoffman (born 1962), American actress
- Cecil Jay (1883–1954), Anglo-American painter
- Cecil Jospé (1928–2004), American photographer and watercolorist
- Cecil Kishimoto (born 1990), Japanese fashion model
- Cecil Chetwynd Kerr, Marchioness of Lothian (1808–1877), British noblewoman and philanthropist
- Cecil Kern (1880–1928), American actress
- Cecil Leitch (1891–1977), British golfer
- Cecil Mary Leslie (1900–1980), British engraver, portrait painter, sculptor and illustrator
- Cecil Roy (1900–1995), American actress
- Cecil Smith (1908–1997), Canadian figure skater
- Cecil Spooner (1875–1953), American actress
- Cecil Woodham-Smith (1896–1977), British historian and biographer

== Fictional characters ==
- Cecil, a character from the American animated series Beany and Cecil
- Cecil (Passions), minor character from the NBC soap opera Passions
- Cecil, Wally's uncle and the Magic Club President in The Wiggles Movie
- Cecil the Geek, a Challenge TV character
- Cecil Adams, an author pseudonym in The Straight Dope newspaper column
- Cecil Aijima, a character in the anime series Uta no Prince-sama
- Cecil Fredericks, a character from the films Night at the Museum and Night at the Museum: Secret of the Tomb
- Cecil Harvey, the main protagonist of Final Fantasy IV
- Cecil Jacobs, character from the book To Kill a Mockingbird
- Cecil Markowitz, minor character from the novel series The Heroes of Olympus and The Trials of Apollo by Rick Riordan
- Cecil Gershwin Palmer, character in the Welcome to Night Vale podcast
- Cecil Putnam, a character in Ninjago
- Cecil Star, father of Patrick Star from the TV series SpongeBob SquarePants, who was featured in The Patrick Star Show
- Cecil Stedman, character in the Invincible comics and its television adaptation.
- Cecil Sudo, the protagonist in the anime series Wizard Barristers
- Cecil Terwilliger, brother of Sideshow Bob in The Simpsons
- Cecil Turtle, Looney Tunes and Merrie Melodies cartoon character
- Cecil Vyse, a character from E. M. Forster's novel A Room with a View
- Cecil, a character from the animated web series The Stickworld

== Others ==
- Cecil (lion), a lion that had lived in Hwange National Park, Zimbabwe, until being killed by an illegal poacher in 2015

== See also ==
- Cecil (surname)
- Cecil (disambiguation)
- Cecilia
