= Cecil Hotel =

Cecil Hotel or Hotel Cecil may refer to:

== Australia ==
- Hotel Cecil, North Ipswich, Queensland
- Hotel Cecil (Southport), Queensland

== Egypt ==
- Cecil Hotel (Alexandria)

== India ==
- The Cecil, Shimla

== Morocco ==
- Hotel Cecil (Tangier, Morocco)

== United Kingdom ==
- Hotel Cecil, London, now demolished
- The Unionist government, 1895–1905, nicknamed the "Hotel Cecil" in 1900

== United States ==
- Cecil Hotel (Los Angeles), United States
- Cecil Hotel (San Diego), United States, now the C Street Inn
- Cecil Hotel, New York City, the site of the jazz club Minton's Playhouse

== See also ==
- Cecil (disambiguation)
