= Cecil =

Cecil may refer to:

== People with the name ==
- Cecil (given name), a given name (including a list of people and fictional characters with the name)
- Cecil (surname), a surname (including a list of people with the name)

== Places ==
=== Canada ===
- Cecil, Alberta, Canada

=== United States ===
- Cecil, Alabama
- Cecil, Georgia
- Cecil, Ohio
- Cecil, Oregon
- Cecil, Pennsylvania
- Cecil, West Virginia
- Cecil, Wisconsin
- Cecil Airport, in Jacksonville, Florida
- Cecil County, Maryland

== Computing and technology ==
- Cecil (programming language), prototype-based programming language
- Computer Supported Learning, a learning management system by the University of Auckland, New Zealand

== Music ==
- Cecil (British band), a band from Liverpool, active 1993–2000
- Cecil (Japanese band), a band from Kajigaya, Japan, active 2000–2006

== Other uses ==
- Cecil (novel), an 1841 novel by Catherine Gore
- Cecil (lion), a famed lion killed in Zimbabwe in 2015
- Cecil (Passions), a minor character from the NBC soap opera Passions
- Cecil (soil), the dominant red clay soil in the American South
- Cecil College, a community college
- The Cecil, a heritage hotel in Shimla, India, built in 1884
- Long Cecil, a gun
- Cecil, a Danish cigarette brand by House of Prince
- Caecilius of Elvira, patron saint of Granada

== See also ==
- Cecil Hotel (disambiguation)
- CeCILL, a French free software license
