= Cecil Moore =

Cecil Moore may refer to:

- Cecil B. Moore (1915–1979), Philadelphia lawyer and civil rights activist
  - Cecil B. Moore, Philadelphia, a neighborhood in the city of Philadelphia
  - Cecil B. Moore station
- Cecil Moore (RAF officer), British RAF officer
- Cecil Moore (soccer) (1926–1984), Irish soccer goalkeeper
- Cecil Moore (architect) (1913–2009), architect and developer in Tucson, Arizona
- Cecil Moore (weightlifter) (1929–2025), Guyanese Olympic weightlifter
