= Campus of Temple University =

College campus in Pennsylvania, US

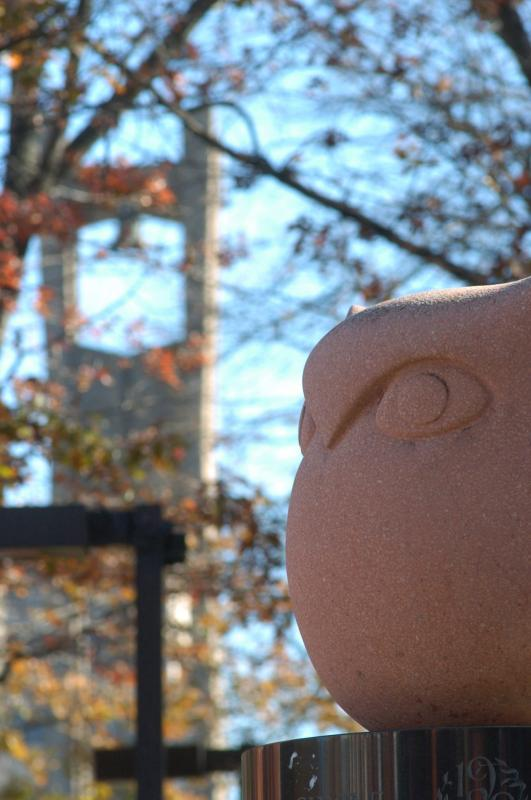
Red Owl by Beniamino Bufano, formerly at Temple University's Alumni Circle

The campus of Temple University is in the Cecil B. Moore neighborhood of North Philadelphia. It is about 1.5 miles (2.4 km) north of Center City and occupies 118 acres (48 ha). The campus is intersected by Broad Street, Philadelphia's busiest north–south artery, and loosely bordered by Diamond Street to the north, Oxford Street to the south, 16th Street to the west, and 11th Street to the east. The Philadelphia skyline is visible from campus, particularly on the upper floors of the taller buildings on campus.

In addition to its Main Campus in North Philadelphia, Temple has a Health Sciences Campus north of Main Campus on Broad Street, a Podiatric Medicine Campus in Chinatown, a campus in Center City, and campuses in Ambler and Harrisburg. Temple has international campuses at Temple University, Japan Campus in Setagaya, Tokyo, and at Temple University Rome.

== History ==
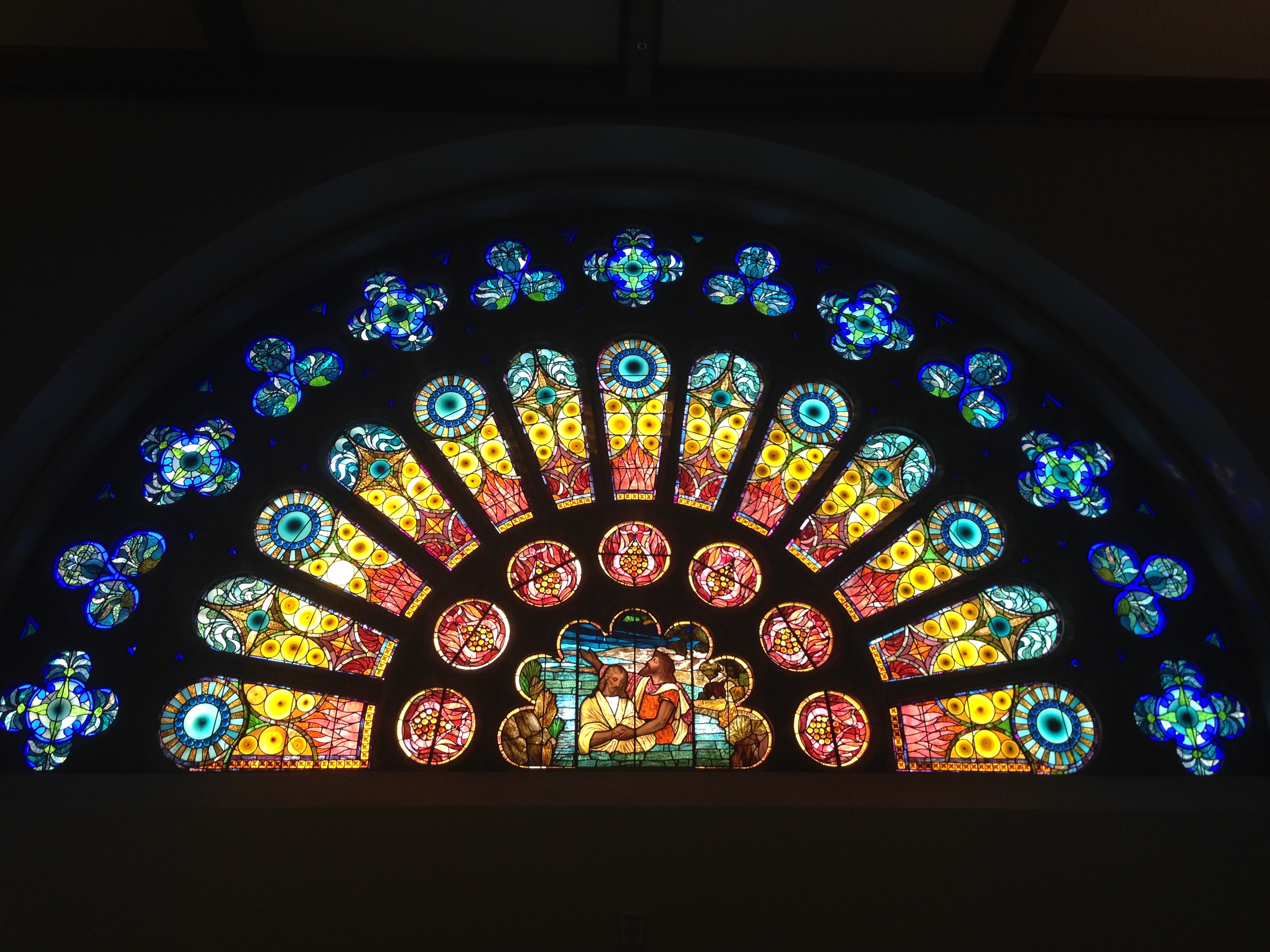
The stained glass window in the Temple Performing Arts Center, originally a Baptist Temple

The university was founded in 1884 by Grace Baptist Church of Philadelphia Pastor Russell Conwell. The church built two buildings on North Broad Street between Montgomery and Norris: a Baptist Temple in 1891, and an academic building (College Hall, now Barrack Hall) in 1893.

As the university expanded, additional buildings were constructed. In the 1960s, Temple University devised a campus expansion plan that would eventually lead to the construction of Paley Library, Gladfelter and Anderson (now Mazur) Halls, Weiss Hall, and Johnson and Hardwick Residence Halls. In order to create space, the university purchased and demolished rowhomes in surrounding neighborhood, displacing residents and causing tension between Temple and the surrounding community. All that remains of several blocks of Park Avenue is a single building incorporating the rowhome's facades (1810 Liacouras Walk) and a small church (Shusterman Hall). By 1979, Temple's campus had grown from its original 4 acres to over 70. Like the University of Pennsylvania and Drexel University in University City, the expansion of Temple's campus has come at the cost of the destruction of surrounding neighborhoods and tense relationships with local residents.

In 2014, Temple University unveiled "Visualize Temple," a campus development plan, with signature projects including a new library and quad in the heart of campus. A companion project, Verdant Temple, was announced in 2015 as a university strategy for updating and beautifying the school's open spaces, walkways and landscaping.

== Academic buildings ==
=== Alter Hall ===
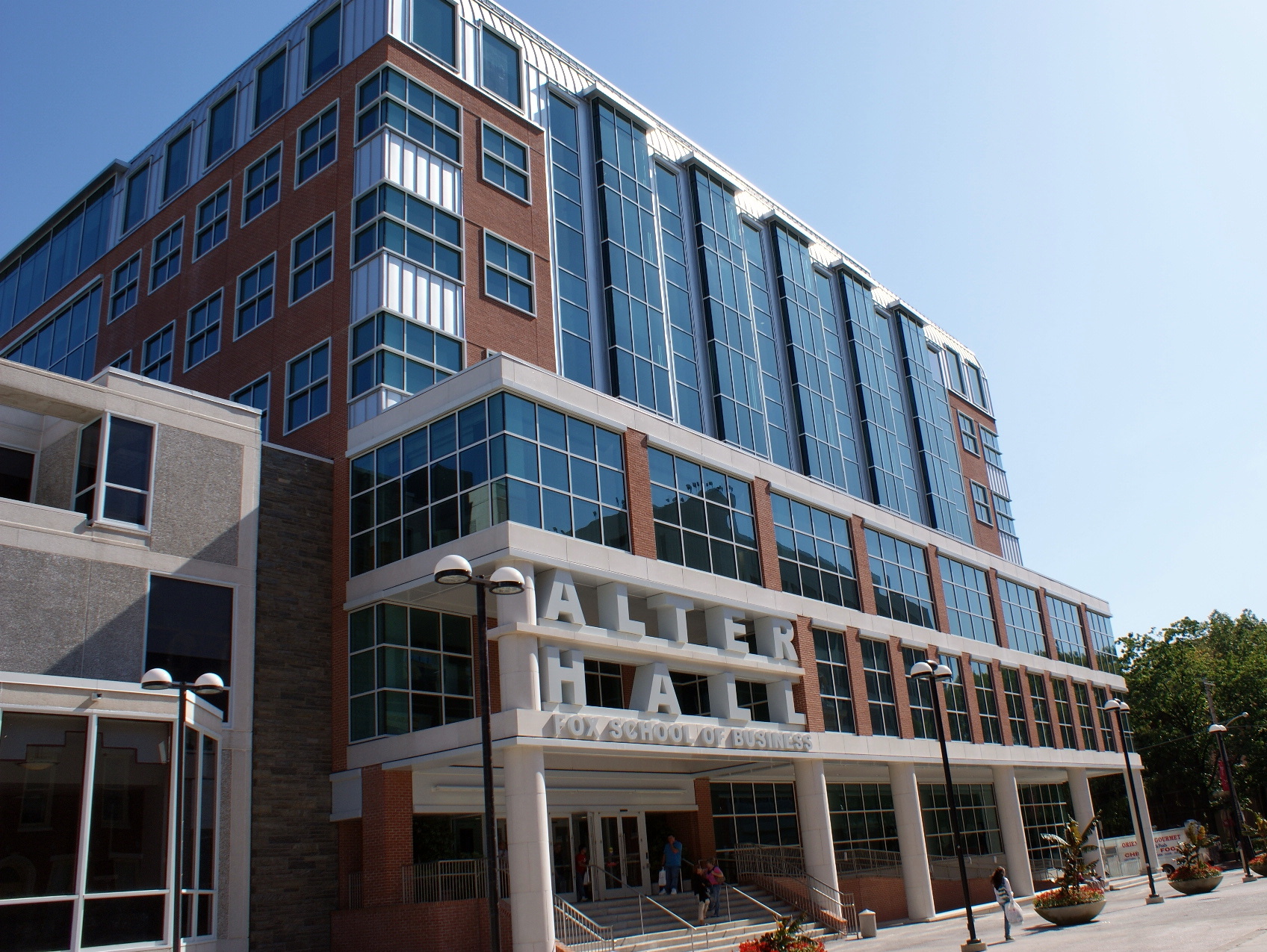
Alter Hall at Fox School of Business

The home of Temple's business school, Alter Hall was completed in 2008 for a cost of $80 million. The 217,000 square-foot, seven-story building was named for Dennis Alter, Temple alum and chairman and CEO of Advanta. Notable features include a three-story atrium, a sky bridge over Liacouras Walk, and a 177-foot elliptical stock ticker, the longest in America at the time. Located at Liacouras Walk and Montgomery Avenue, Alter Hall replaced Curtis Hall, which was built in 1955 and held 50 classrooms.

=== Annenberg Hall and Tomlinson Theater ===
Annenberg Hall houses the departments of Advertising, Journalism, and Media Studies and Production in the Klein College of Media and Communication. The four-floor structure cost about $7 million to erect in 1968. Annenberg Hall was named for Walter Annenberg and includes film and television production studios, smart classrooms, and Bell Tower Music, Temple's student-run record label. The Joe First Media Center links Annenberg Hall and the Tomlinson Theater and was built in 2002. The center is a communications and social hub for the college and includes a café, a multimedia information center and a venue for displaying student work.

Tomlinson Theater is a 450-seat proscenium theatre with a full orchestra pit. It opened in 1968 and was named for Temple Vice President Emeritus William Tomlinson. Randall Theater is an 80-seat black box theater named for Paul E. "Pop" Randall who staged more than 100 productions during his 38 years as a professor of theater at Temple.

=== Barton and Beury Halls ===
Barton Hall and Beury Hall were constructed on both sides of 13th Street. The university razed several blocks of mostly-occupied rowhomes in order to clear the space needed for these academic buildings. Barton Hall, which opened in 1959, was the original physical science building. It was replaced by the Science Education and Research Center and demolished in 2015 to make way for Charles Library. Beury Hall still stands, and was built in 1963. In 2009, Beury Hall was renovated for $25 million. Improvements included infrastructure and lab upgrades, and wireless technology in classrooms and lecture halls. The building was named in honor of Charles Ezra Beury, who served as a trustee of Temple from 1913 to 1952 and was the university's second president from 1925 to 1941.

=== College of Engineering Building ===
The College of Engineering Building is located at 12th and Norris Street and was built in 1975.

The Innovation, Design, Engineering and Applied Science (IDEAS) Hub is an $4.5 million renovation on the second floor of the College of Engineering building. Completed in 2020, the 8,000-square-foot space is outfitted with leading-edge tools including robotics and drone stations, additive manufacturing, and 3D printing labs.

=== Gladfelter and Mazur Halls ===
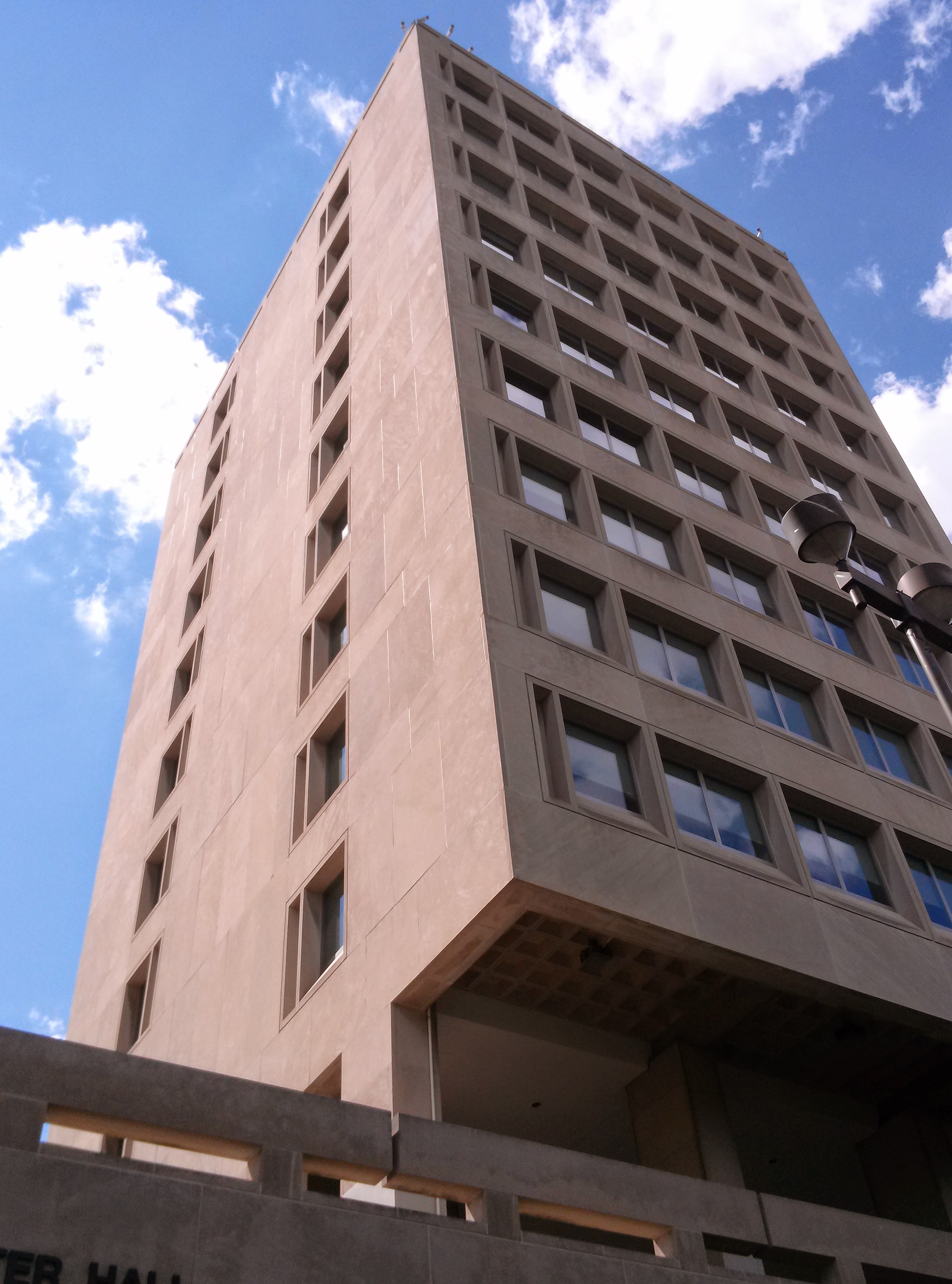
Gladfelter Hall

Located over Polett Walk between 11th and 12th Streets, Gladfelter Hall and Mazur Hall (formerly Anderson Hall) opened in 1973 and are home to the College of Liberal Arts. The Grace Baptist Church, Russell Conwell's first church in Philadelphia, was demolished in 1969 to make room for Gladfelter Hall. Standing at 10 stories tall, the two buildings are connected by an elevated courtyard. In 2020, Temple embarked on an expansive renovation of Anderson and Gladfelter's public courtyard, a new glass atrium for Anderson Hall, and the creation of a gateway for the eastern entrance of campus. Originally named for Temple Presidents Millard E. Gladfelter and Paul R. Anderson, Anderson Hall was renamed Mazur Hall in 2021 for Temple alum and co-founder and Chairman of Leonard-Meron Biosciences, Inc., Leonard Mazur and his wife Helena.

=== Klein Hall ===
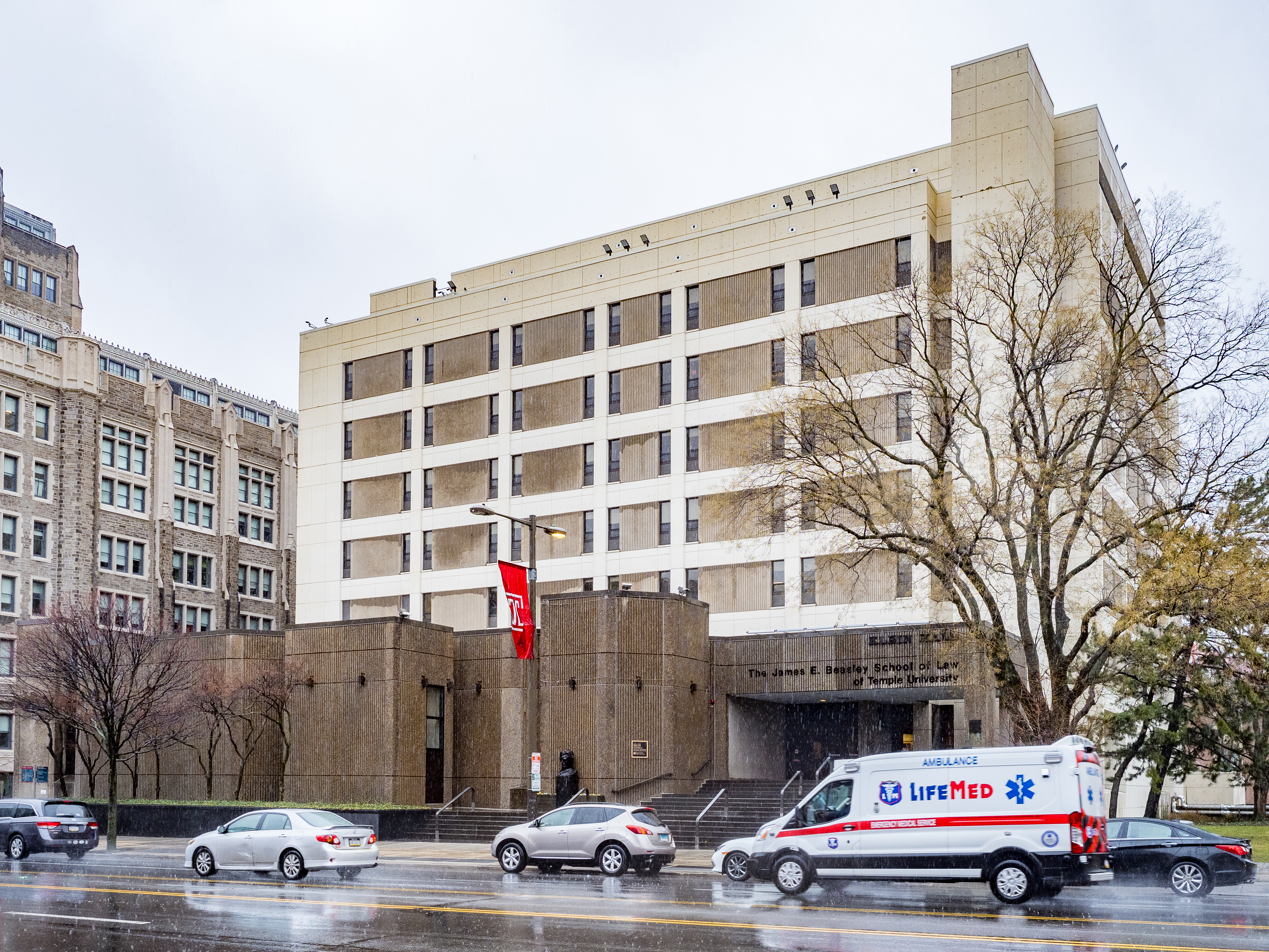
Klein Hall

Built in 1973, the Charles Klein Law Building is the main building for the Beasley School of Law. It is located on Broad Street and houses the law library, mock trial practice rooms, and the Duane Morris LLP Moot Court Room, which provides space for moot court competitions, lectures, and meetings. Temple's law library spans the third to eighth floors of Klein Hall and includes seven levels of book stacks.

Science Education and Research Center

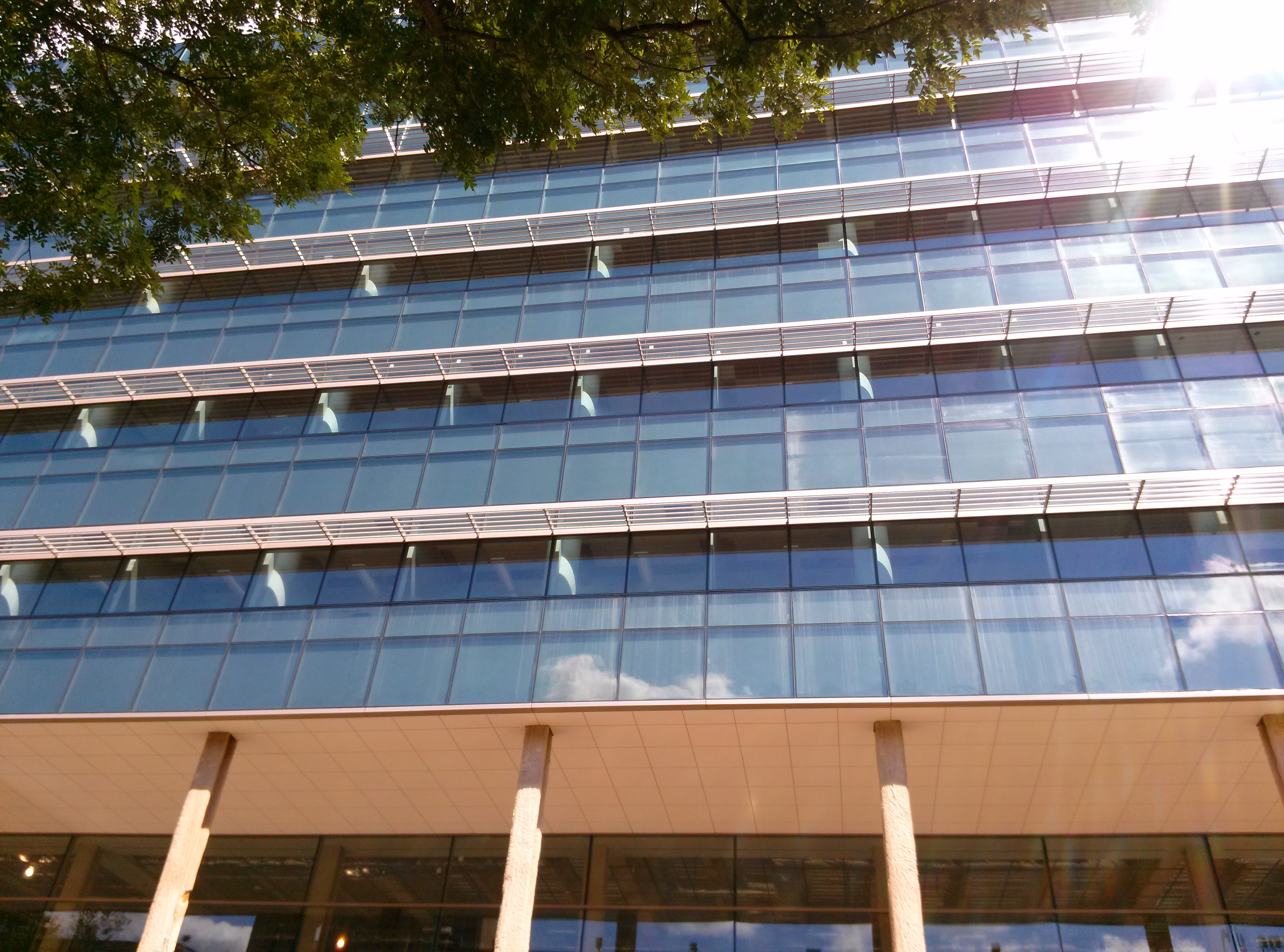
The Science and Education Research Center (SERC)

Home to seven research centers and institutes, the Science Education and Research Center (SERC) opened in 2014. This 246,700 square-foot, seven-story building contains 52 research labs and 16 teaching labs, and is LEED Gold Certified. Programmed specifically as an interdisciplinary research and teaching facility, 1,900 linear feet of exterior sunshades lower the cost of heating and cooling and keep the sun's heat out of the building's labs. It houses Temple's College of Science and Technology (CST) and is connected to Temple's Engineering Building via a two-story entrance atrium.

=== Presser Hall and Rock Hall ===
Located on opposite corners of Temple's Main Campus, Presser Hall and Rock Hall are the main buildings for the music departments of the Boyer College of Music and Dance. Presser Hall, on 12th and Norris Street, shares a lobby and cafe with the Tyler School of Art. It houses practice rooms and classrooms, a recording studio, Klein Recital Hall and Arronson Hall, a rehearsal space. The second floor is dedicated to Temple's Jazz Studies program.

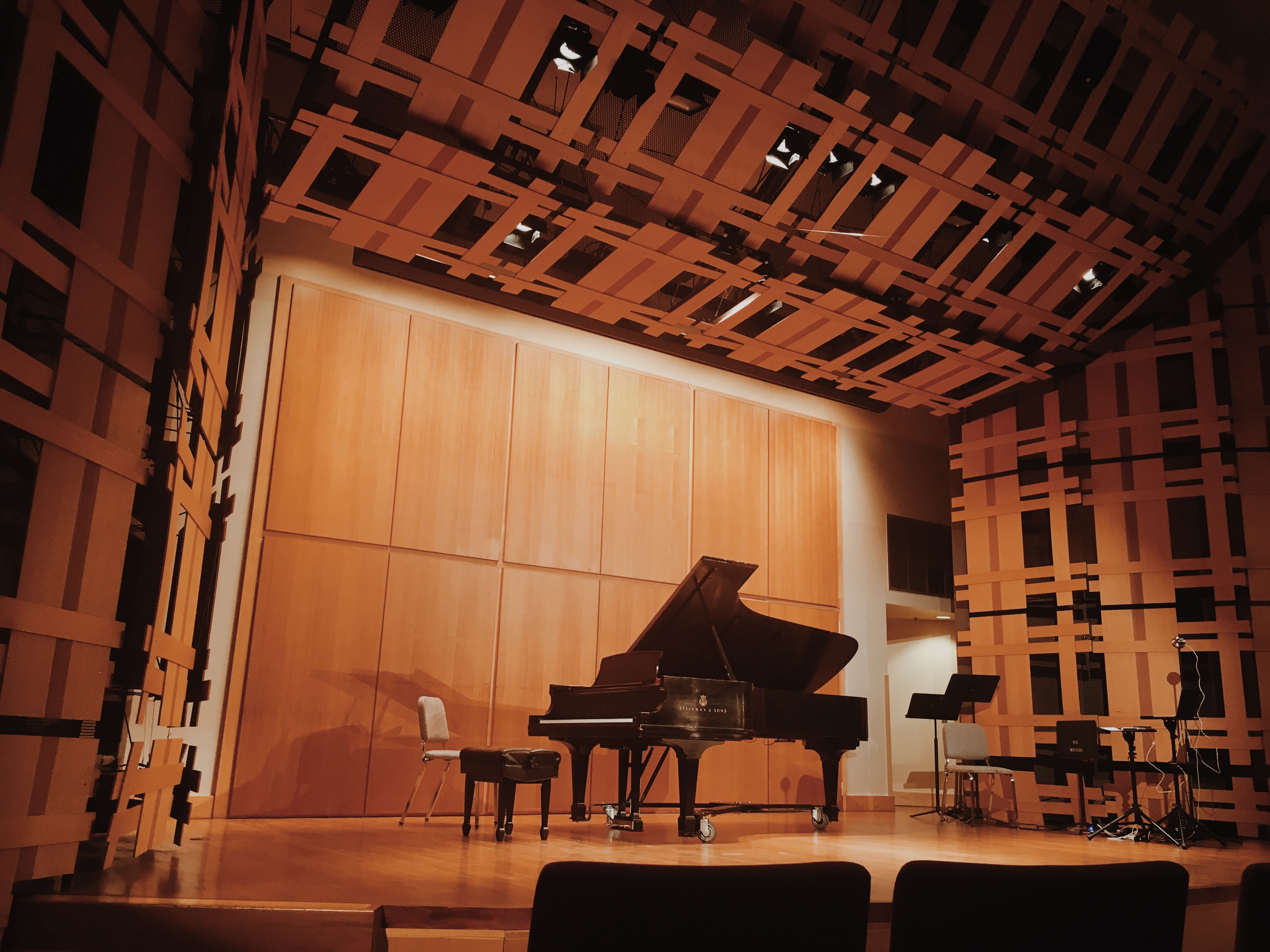
Rock Hall Auditorium, one of the Boyer College of Music and Dance's performance venues

Rock Hall, on Broad Street, originally belonged to the Philadelphia College of Osteopathic Medicine. It comprised two large lecture halls, three classrooms and a gynecological operating room. Now, it houses Rock Hall Auditorium, practice rooms, and the Presser Creative Music Technology Center. The 306-seat Rock Hall Auditorium is the premier recital and performance space for Boyer students. The Presser Creative Music Technology Center is located in the building's basement and is situated underground next to the Broad Street Line, which can be heard from the classroom.

=== Speakman Hall ===
Located on Liacouras Walk, Speakman Hall is the home of the School of Sport, Tourism and Hospitality Management. It was built for $3.3 million in 1966 and served as the School of Business Administration building. A student-run Saxbys Coffee opened in Speakman Hall in 2018 as part of an experiential learning program partnership between Saxbys and the School of Sport, Tourism and Hospitality Management.

=== Tyler School of Art and Architecture Building ===
In 2009, Temple's Tyler School of Art moved from suburban Elkins Park into a new, 255,000 square-foot, state-of-the-art building at Temple's Main Campus. The building on 12th and Norris Street cost $76.4 million, and integrated Temple's art school among the rest of the university. It includes gallery spaces, classrooms, and a cafe (currently called "The Art of Bread") across four floors. It shares an atrium and the cafe with the Boyer College of Music and Dance's Presser Hall, which occupied that space before the art school moved to Main Campus. Only three years later, the architecture department moved into a new 50,000-square-foot Architecture Building connected to the new Tyler building.

=== Wachman Hall ===
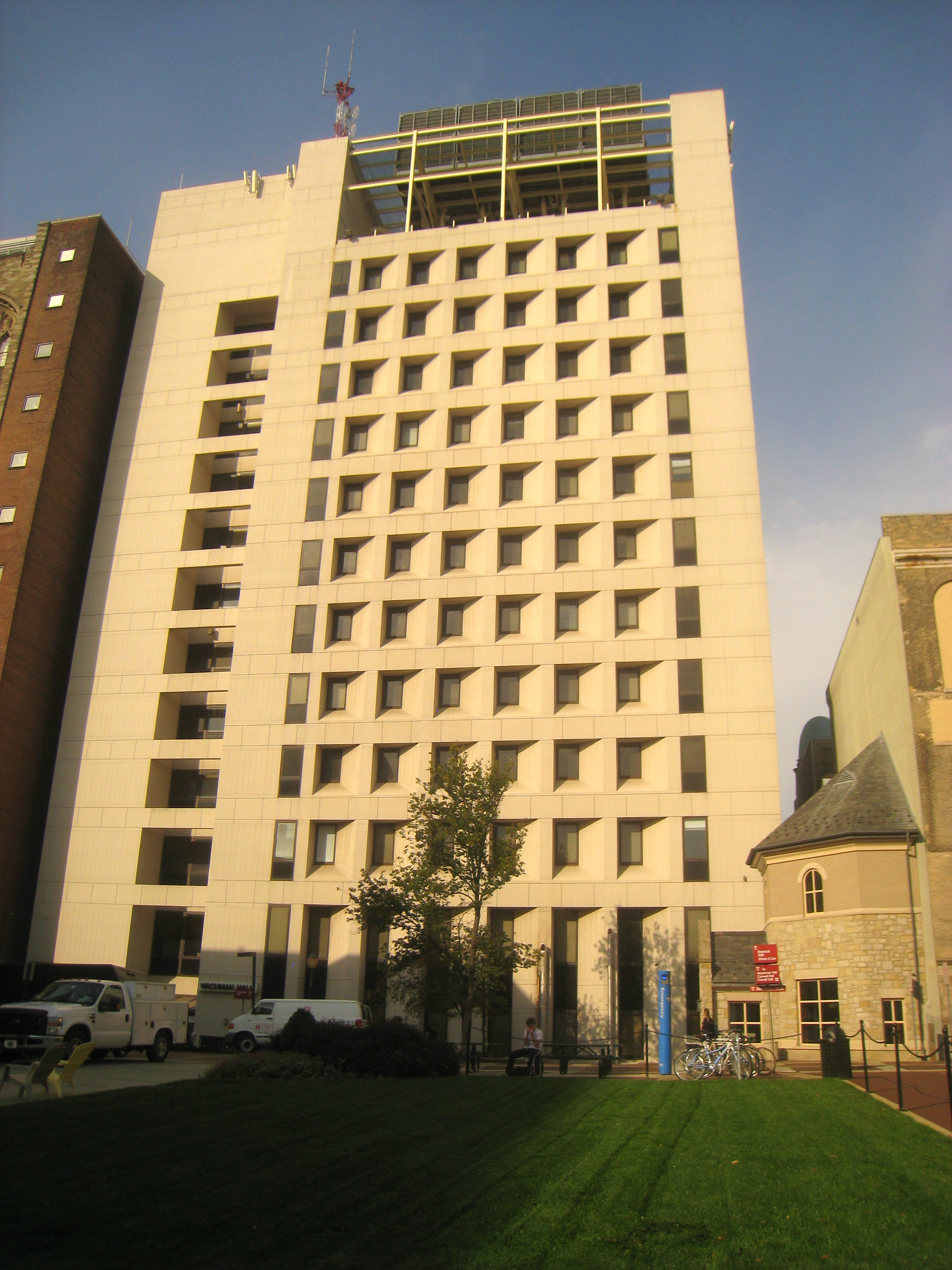
Wachman Hall

With entrances on both Broad Street and Liacouras Walk, Wachman Hall offers 12 floors of classroom space and is home to the College of Science and Technology's Mathematics Department. The building was renovated in 2015 in order to relieve congestion, improve environmental sustainability, and create a more welcoming appearance. Wachman Hall is LEED Gold Certified.

=== Weiss Hall ===
Located on Cecil B. Moore Avenue, Weiss Hall is home to the College of Liberal Arts' Psychology Department.

== Landmarks ==
=== Founder's Garden and O'Connor Plaza ===
At the heart of campus is Founder's Garden, the burial place of Russell Conwell, founder and 38-year president of Temple University. A graduate of Yale, Civil War captain, Boston lawyer, and Philadelphia minister, Conwell used the income from his famous “Acres of Diamonds” speech to fund Temple as a place where working-class Philadelphians could receive higher education. A bust of Conwell marks his grave in the Founder's Garden.

O'Connor Plaza surrounds the Founder's Garden between Polett Walk and Liacouras Walk. A renovated plaza and Founder's Garden opened in 2017, featuring a large bronze owl statue in commemoration of the university's mascot, the owls; a water wall; and an inlaid Temple T (the university's logo) in the brickwork of the plaza. O'Connor Plaza was named in honor of Board of Trustees Chair Patrick J. O’Connor and his wife, Marie.

O'Connor Plaza replaced Alumni Circle, which was a circular tiered brick wall. A sculpture called "Red Owl" mounted at Alumni Circle was given as a gift to Temple from Bell Atlantic due to the university purchasing an in-house telecommunication system from the company. The Alumni Circle served as a whispering gallery: if you stood in the middle of the circle and whispered, you could hear your echo.

=== The Bell Tower ===
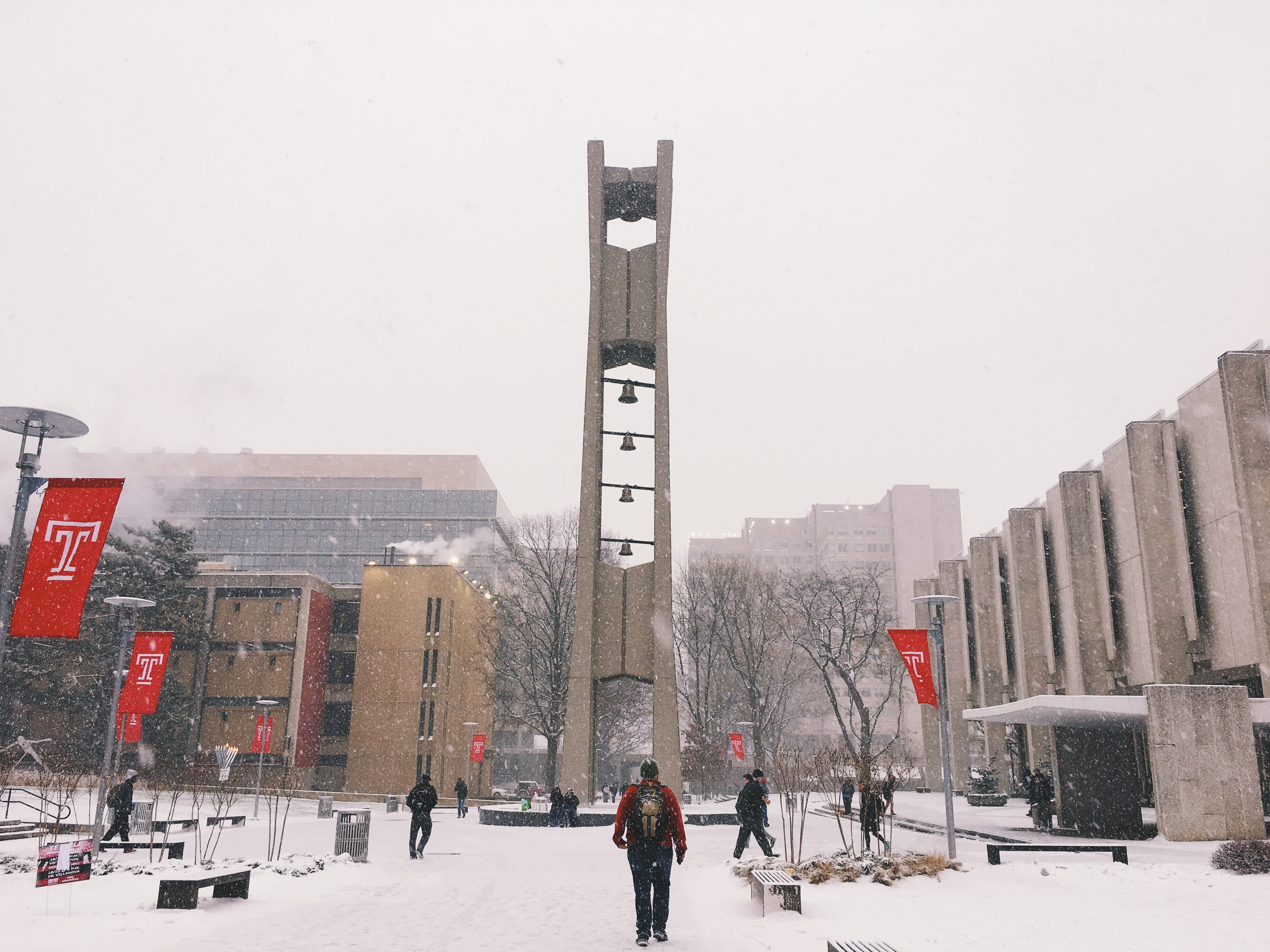
The Bell Tower in 2017, prior to the renovation of its base

A visual icon of Temple University, the Bell Tower was completed in 1966 and sits at 110 feet (34 m) tall in the center of Main Campus between Paley Hall (formerly Samuel Paley Library) and Beury Hall. In 2018, the tower's base and concrete plaza was renovated, with the landscaped circular based named Lenfest Circle in honor of longtime trustee H.F Gerry Lenfest. The next year, lights were installed on the tower, illuminating it each evening.

=== Beury Beach ===
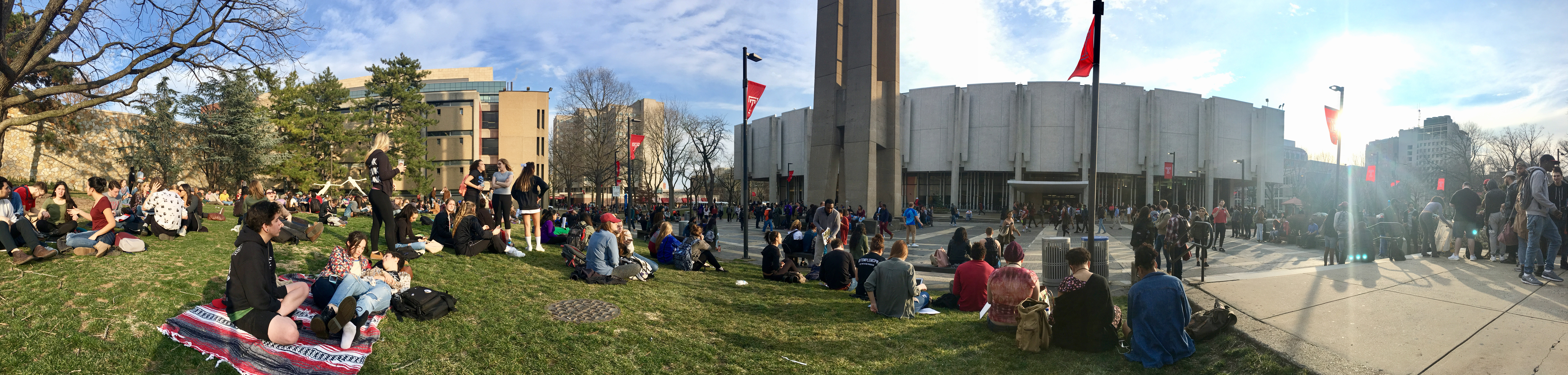
Panorama of Beury Beach, the Bell Tower, and Paley Library

The grassy area surrounding the Bell Tower is commonly referred to by students as "Beury Beach," or simply "the beach." Beury Beach is the largest green space on the dense urban campus. Combined with the Bell Tower's Lenfest Circle, this area is a hangout location for students. Another green area on campus is the Johnny Ring Garden, tucked away between Mitten Hall and 1940 Residence Hall. The garden celebrates Conwell and Civil War soldier Johnny Ring.

=== Liacouras Walk ===
Liacouras Walk, named after Temple President Peter J. Liacouras, is the campus' main internal north–south pedestrian corridor. It runs through the campus parallel to Broad Street and was once part of Park Avenue. The north end of Liacouras Walk runs alongside 1940 Residence Hall, Charles Library, and two retail buildings. It then intersects Polett Walk, the east/west pedestrian corridor where a segment of Berks Street once stood. The Conwell Inn, the university's on-campus hotel, is located at this intersection.

Past Polett Walk, the facade of 1810 Liacouras Walk is the only remnant of old Park Avenue rowhomes, most of which were demolished in the 20th century. A sky bridge over Liacouras Walk connects 1810 Liacouras Walk to Alter Hall, which are both used by the Fox School of Business and Management. The path then crosses Montgomery Avenue, where it turns into "The Cut," a plaza leading to the Cecil B. Moore subway station and Cecil B. Moore Avenue. The entirety of Liacouras Walk and Polett Walk were resurfaced and redeveloped between 2016 and 2022, with pavers that allow for stormwater runoff to drain more easily. This renovation also added green space and improved the continuity of the pedestrian walkway.

=== Howard Gittis Student Center ===
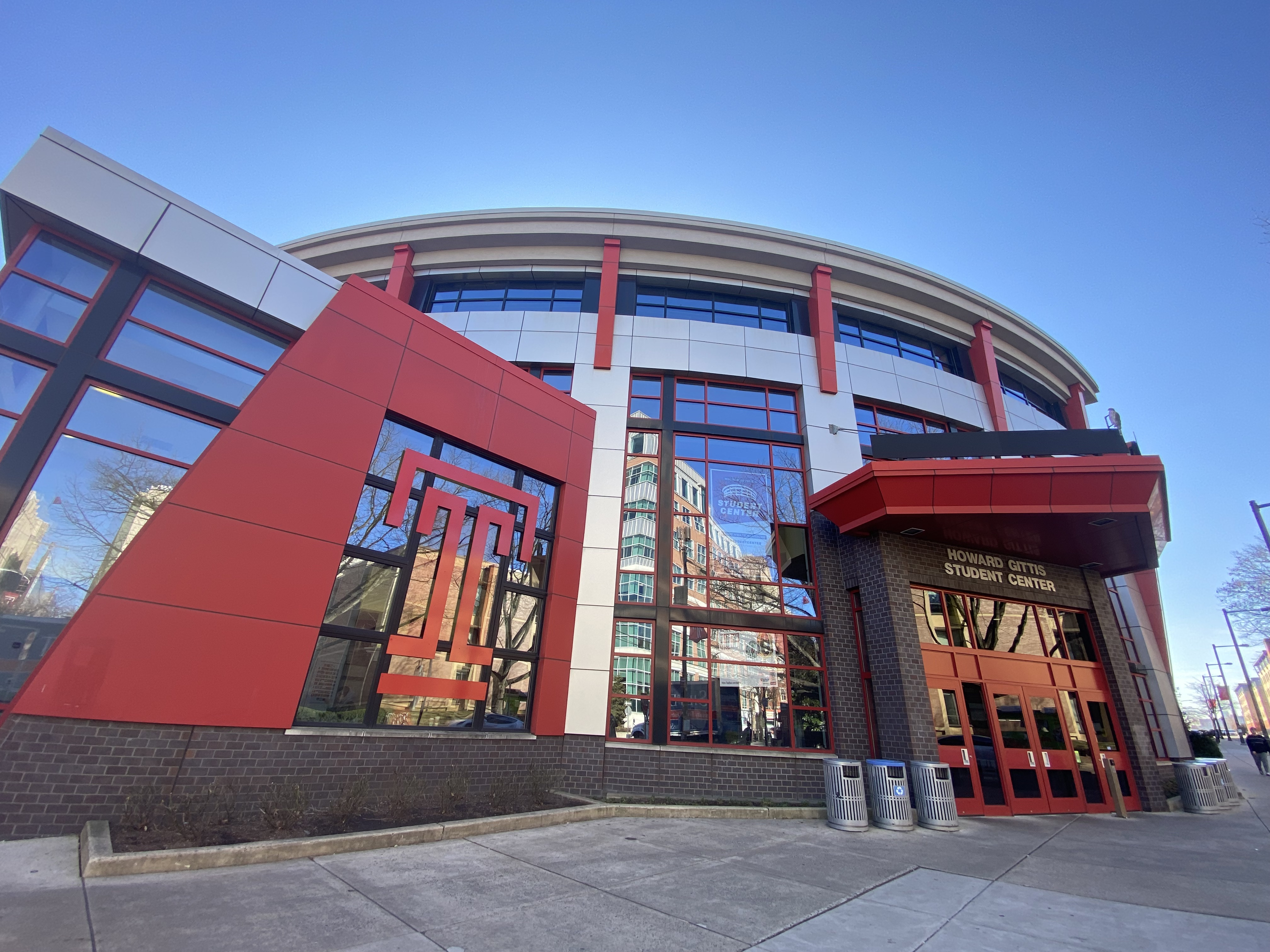
Howard Gittis Student Center

Temple's Student Center has been located at 13th and Montgomery Streets since 1965. Known as the Student Activities Center (informally SAC), the building was torn apart and remodeled in phases starting in 2000. The new building featured an atrium, a new food court, a lounge, and convention center-style meeting spaces for student organizations. This renovation also included a new exterior for the building: a distinctive round facade with large red Temple Ts in the windows on both sides of the building. In 2017, the Student Center was renovated with a new atrium and food court with expanded dining options. In addition to the atrium, food court, and meeting spaces, it currently houses the campus bookstore, a UPS store, a performance and event space, a movie theater, and a game room. The Student Activities Center was renamed in 2006 after Temple Board of Trustees member Howard Gittis.

=== Temple Performing Arts Center ===
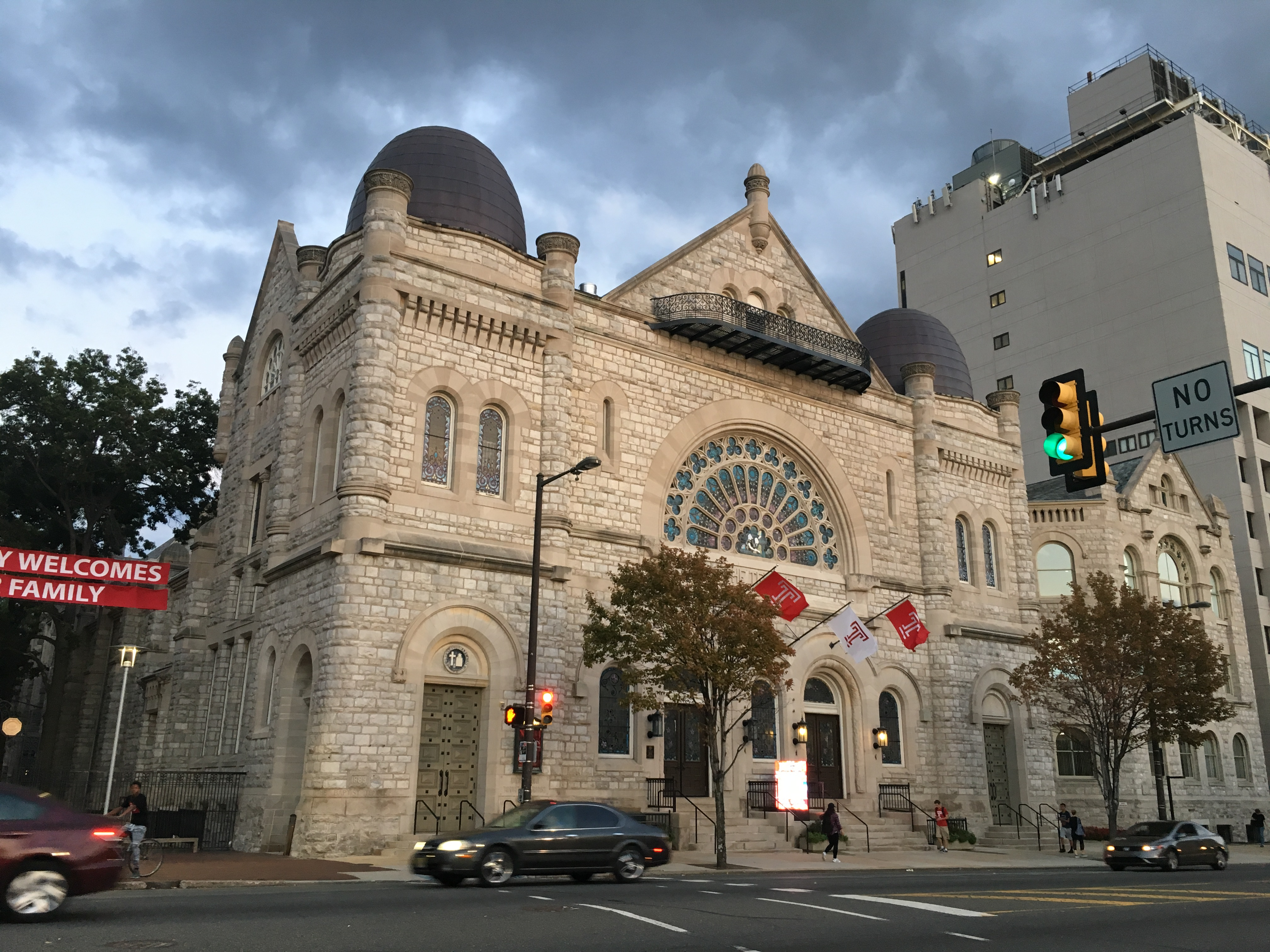
Temple University Performing Arts Center in 2016

Built in 1891, the Temple Performing Arts Center (TPAC) is housed in what was the Grace Baptist Church, the founding site of the university. The "Baptist Temple" as it came to be known in the 20th century was the site of the appearances of people such as Martin Luther King Jr., President Franklin D. Roosevelt, and Helen Keller. In 1951, the Chapel of Four Chaplains constructed in the west end of the building's lower level. The University purchased the Temple in 1974. The building was certified by the Philadelphia Historical Commission as an Historical Building in 1984, and in 2003 it was designated by the American Institute of Architects as a Landmark Building.

In 2010, the Romanesque temple was converted into a 1200-seat, multipurpose performance venue for $29 million. It includes two performance and event spaces: Lew Klein Hall, a two-level auditorium with a thrust stage and the Chapel, a smaller, intimate space. TPAC has hosted the Philadelphia Orchestra, Ben Folds, The "President's Own" United States Marine Band, and more. It also hosts performances by Temple's Boyer College of Music and Dance, as well as university and high school graduation ceremonies.

=== Liacouras Center ===
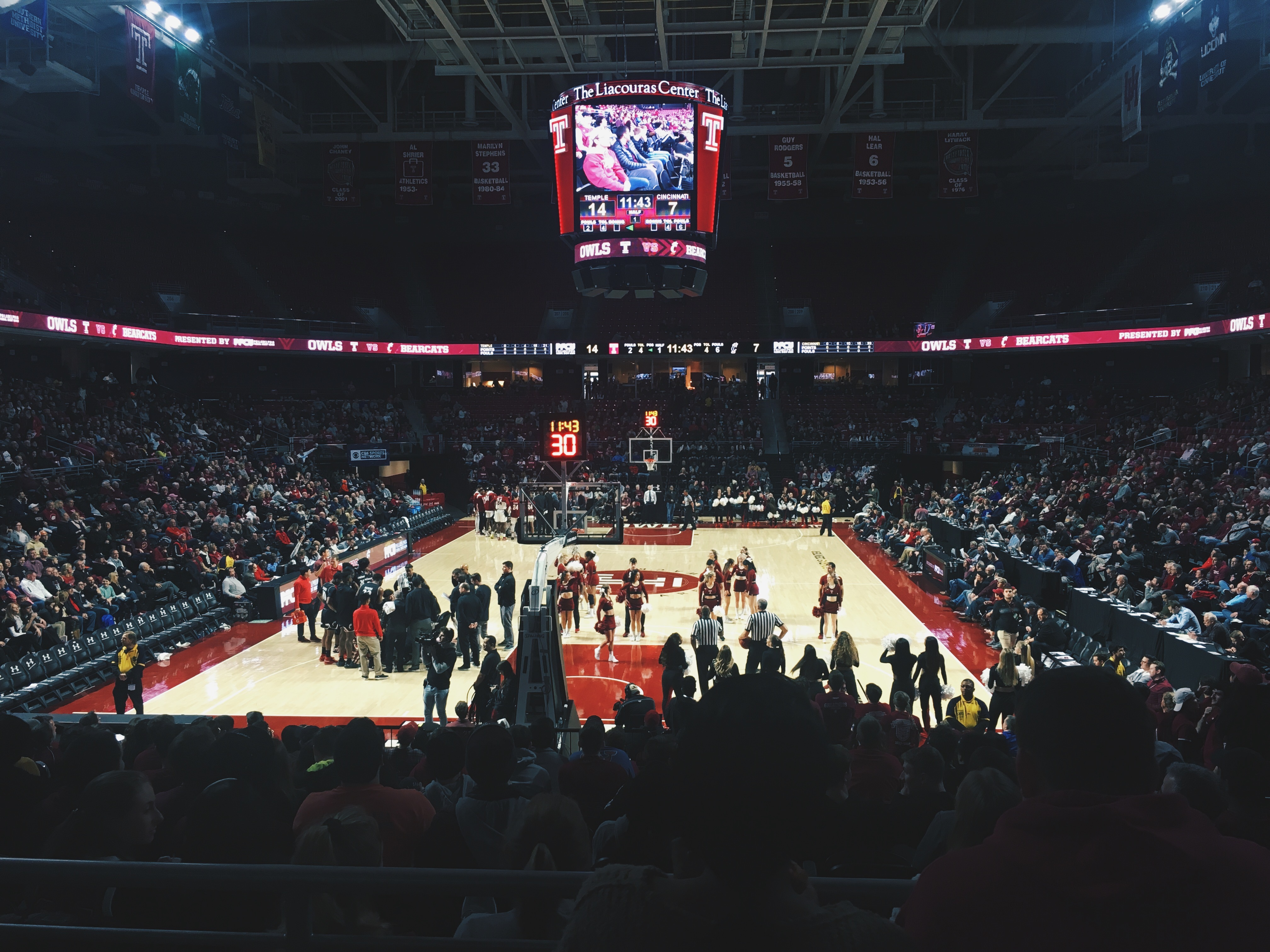
Liacouras Center at a Temple Owls basketball game

Located on Broad Street, the Liacouras Center is a 10,206-seat multi-purpose venue which opened in 1997. Originally named "The Apollo of Temple," it was renamed in 2000 for university President Peter J. Liacouras. The Liacouras Center is the largest indoor, public assembly venue in Philadelphia north of City Hall. It is home to the Temple Owls men's basketball team as well as some Temple Owls women's basketball games.

=== TECH Center ===
The Teaching, Education, Collaboration and Help Center, or TECH, Center is located in what was previously the Bell Building, home of Bell Atlantic operations. It is located at 12th Street and Montgomery Avenue and cost $16 million to build in 2006. It spans 75,000 square feet and houses over 500 computers, a keyboard lab, 3D printers, breakout rooms, and a media studio. It also has a recording booth for recording music and specialty labs for video editing, music and graphic design.

=== Charles Library ===
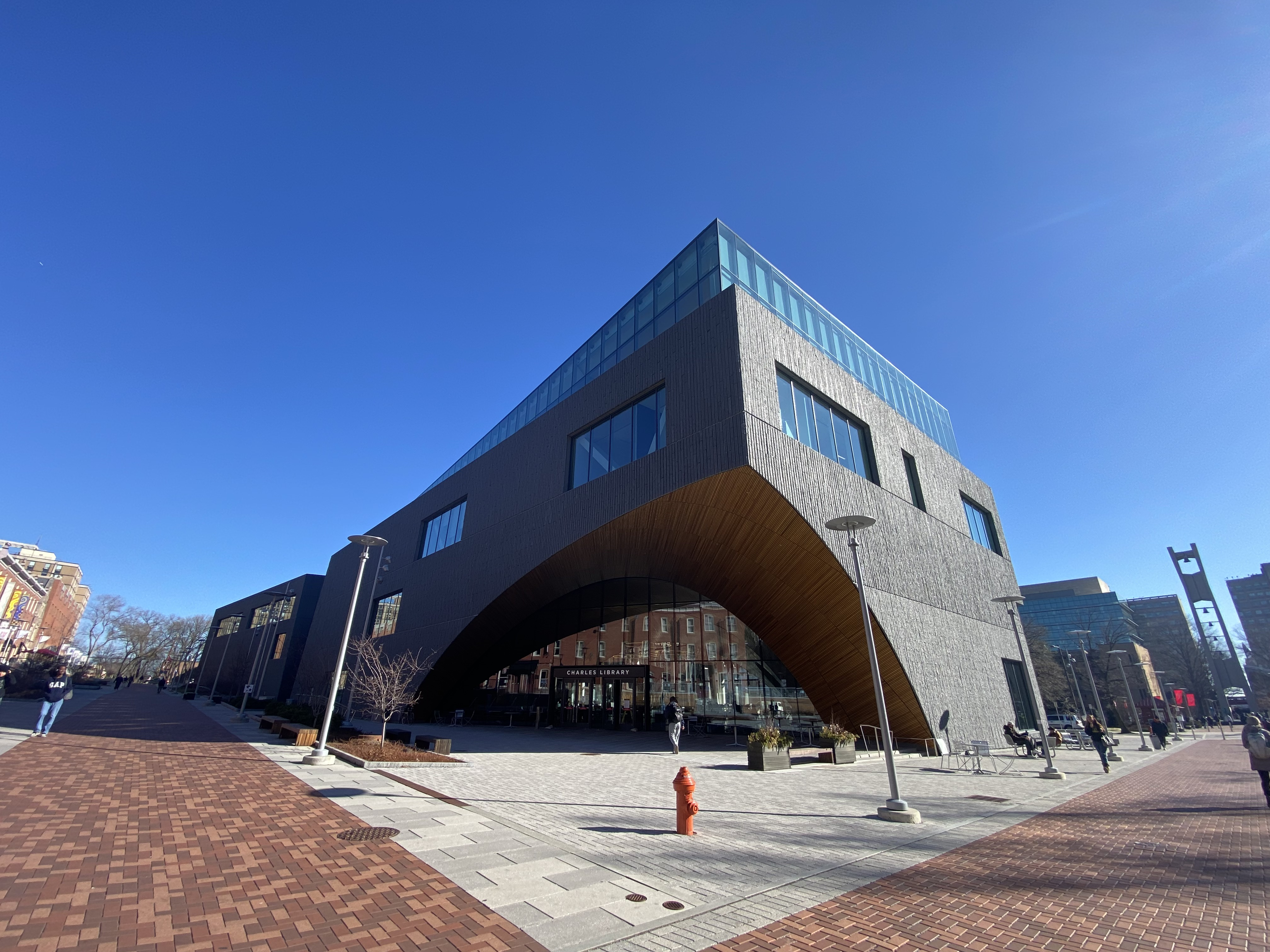
Charles Library in 2023

In 2019, the university opened Charles Library, a four-story tall building designed by international architectural design office Snøhetta. The library features 220,000 square feet of space and includes meeting rooms, study spaces, media studios, and a green roof. As of 2020, the library holdings amounted to 4 million physical items, including 1.5 million books, and 1.5 million electronic books. The library includes both an automated search and retrieval system (called the BookBot) and browsable stacks for physical volumes. The library is open to the general public. Charles Library is Temple's fourth library: the previous libraries were College (now Barrack) Hall (opened 1893), Sullivan Hall (1936), and Paley Hall (1966).

=== "The Wall" ===
Officially Temple University's 12th Street Vendor Pad, "The Wall" is an outdoor dining area near the TECH Center and SERC. Technically a free-standing building in front of the Gladfelter and Mazur courtyard, students and campus guests can purchase pizza, Thai food, and Richie's, a campus favorite. The seating area was renovated in 2023.

== Residence halls ==
Students can live in several on-campus housing units: Johnson and Hardwick Residence Halls, James S. White Residence Hall, 1940 Residence Hall, 1300 Residence Hall, Morgan Hall, and Temple Towers Residence Hall. Although Temple's eight residence halls service over 5,000 on-campus residents, the majority of Temple students opt to live within a mile radius of campus in off-campus apartments. As of 2023, 19% of Temple undergraduate students live in college-owned, -operated or -affiliated housing while 81% of students live off campus.

=== Johnson and Hardwick Halls ===
The Johnson and Hardwick Residence Halls, commonly called "J&H," are twin 11-floor high-rise facilities that are used as the traditional residence halls on Main Campus. Located at Broad and Diamond Street, the two buildings house around 1,000 students. The Louis J. Esposito Dining Center is on the ground level of the Johnson and Hardwick Halls near the north end of Main Campus. The Esposito Dining Center is the main dining hall on campus. Restorations to Johnson and Hardwick in 2010 included the renovation of a lobby with new entry points, security stations, office space, and lounge space. In 2017, both interior and exterior renovations to the residence halls were completed.

=== James S. White Hall ===
White Hall is a four-story complex on the west side of Broad Street. It opened in the fall of 1993 and houses 558 newly admitted first-year students in two-person and four-person suites with private baths. It also includes two open-air courtyards, and areas for TV viewing, exercising, and studying.

=== 1940 Residence Hall ===
470 first- and second-year students live in 1940 Residence Hall, which opened in the fall of 1999. Residents live in two-person and four-person suites with private baths. Residents of 1940 (named for its street address) enjoy game rooms, a TV lounge, a multipurpose room for programming, and many study and social areas.

=== 1300 Residence Hall ===
Opened in the fall of 2001, 1300 North and South accommodates up to 1044 newly admitted, returning, and transfer Main Campus students in suites on the first three floors and in apartments on the top two floors of the complex. Like 1940 Residence Hall, 1300 is named for its street address. Residents of 1300 enjoy a TV lounge, a game room, and study and social areas. 1300 also contains several classrooms for Honors students.

=== Morgan Hall ===
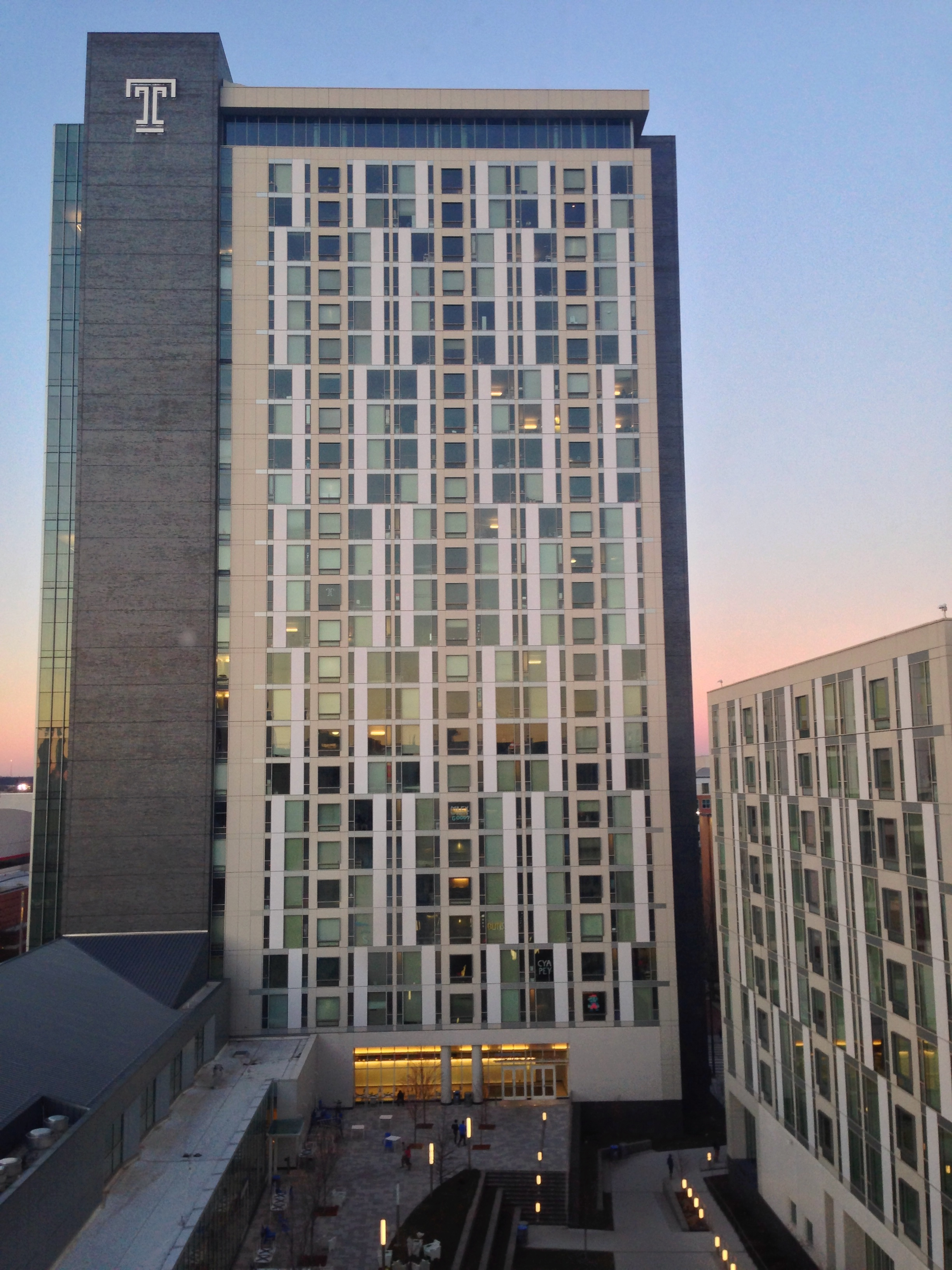
Morgan Hall North from Morgan Hall South in 2016

A mixed-use residential, retail, and dining facility designed to house nearly 1,300 students, the Mitchell and Hilarie Morgan Residence Hall and Dining Complex opened in July 2013. The complex is at the corner of Broad Street and Cecil B. Moore Avenue, steps from the Broad Street Line Cecil B. Moore station and contains three buildings surrounding an elevated terrace. The project cost $216 million, and was designed by Philadelphia architecture firm MGA Partners.

The tallest and centerpiece of the complex is the 27-floor Morgan Hall North, by far the tallest building in North Philadelphia. It contains 24 floors of residential space for both first-year experience students (transfers and freshmen) as well as returning students (sophomores, juniors, and seniors), a top floor event space, and retail space on the ground level. Connected to Morgan Hall North is the Dining Hall building, which runs along Broad Street and provides students with 5 dining options. Morgan Dining Hall closed in the fall 2023 semester, although the food court with third-party dining options remained open.

Morgan Hall South is ten floors tall and houses first-year students. The suites in both Morgan Hall and Morgan South include two bedrooms that share a common living area, a kitchenette with a cooktop, full fridge, and microwave, and private bathrooms for each bedroom. Both residence halls feature floor-to-ceiling windows covering the entire side of the building that provide views of the campus and Center City, and allow for extensive natural light to enter into all interior spaces of the building.

=== Temple Towers ===
Temple Towers is a six-story complex that houses approximately 658 second-year and transfer students and consists of two towers, East and West. It features three-, six-, and seven-person bedroom apartments, all with private bathrooms and fully equipped kitchens. Bedroom furniture, desks and chairs, and living room furniture are provided. Residents at Temple Towers have the option of choosing to be on the meal plan. Temple Towers offers a game room, social lounges (with a fireplace), study lounges, a TV lounge, a bike storage space, and computer stations with printing.

=== Graduate housing ===
Podiatry Housing is a seven-story apartment building at 8th and Cherry Street in Center City Philadelphia.

=== Former housing ===
==== Peabody Hall (demolished) ====
Built in 1956, the Gertrude Peabody Residence Hall was originally designed as a women's residence hall with a campus cafeteria in the basement. The building was known to have been built on land that once occupied one of Russell Conwell's, Temple University's founder, original homes. The residence hall underwent many renovations to better serve modern students including a study/conference room lounge, game room, computer lab, kitchen, new windows, and air conditioning.

Announced before winter break in the 2017–2018 academic year, the University demolished Peabody Hall. As of 2019, Temple University has converted the area into a grassy area for students.

==== Triangle Apartment complex (demolished) ====
Located at Broad and Norris Street, the Triangle Apartment Complex was Temple's graduate and family housing unit. The complex consisted of converted brownstones. Each building had five units. Minors residing with graduate student parents/guardians were zoned to the School District of Philadelphia, with specific zoned schools being Tanner Duckrey School (K-8) and Simon Gratz High School. In 2010 the university proposed banning children from living in the Triangle complex. The university later rescinded the plan. In 2014, the university announced plans to demolish the facility, and did so in 2015.

== Public transportation ==
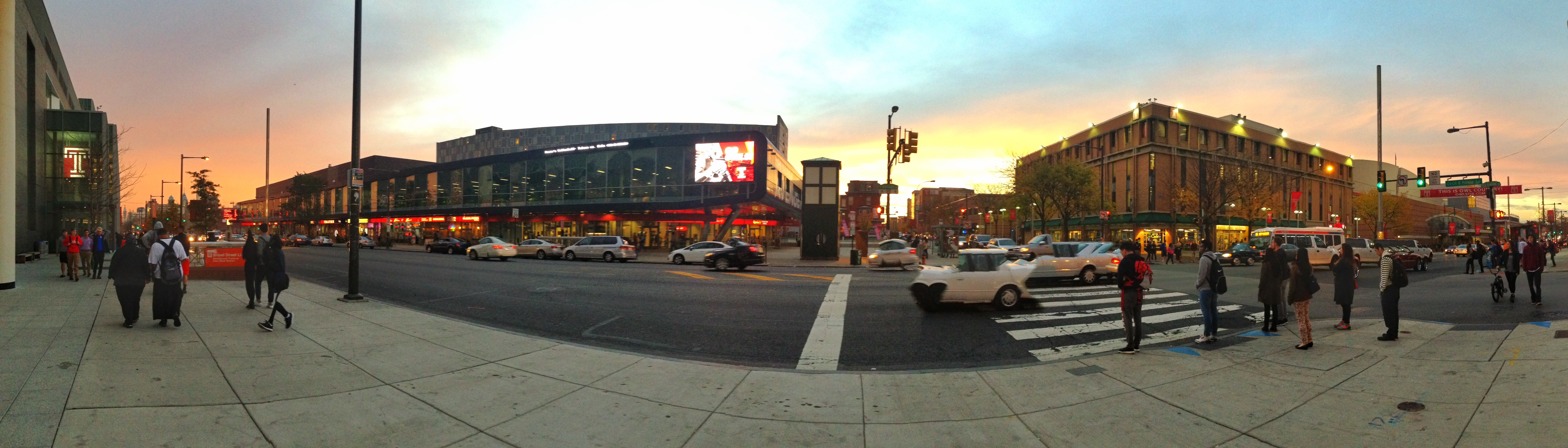
Panorama of the south end of Temple's campus, near the Cecil B. Moore station

Temple University's campus is accessible by SEPTA. The Broad Street Line runs directly through and underneath Temple's campus. The Cecil B. Moore station is within campus borders, located at Broad Street and Cecil B. Moore Avenue. The BSL Susquehanna–Dauphin station is located north of campus, and is accessible to students that live off-campus. The C, 3, and 23 bus routes also stop at the Cecil B. Moore station.

Temple University is served by SEPTA Regional Rail at Temple University station. The station serves 13 different commuter rail lines, and is located at the eastern end of the campus at 10th and Berks Street. Additionally, the North Broad station at Broad Street and West Huntingdon Street, is served by Regional Rail.
