= Temple University Rome =

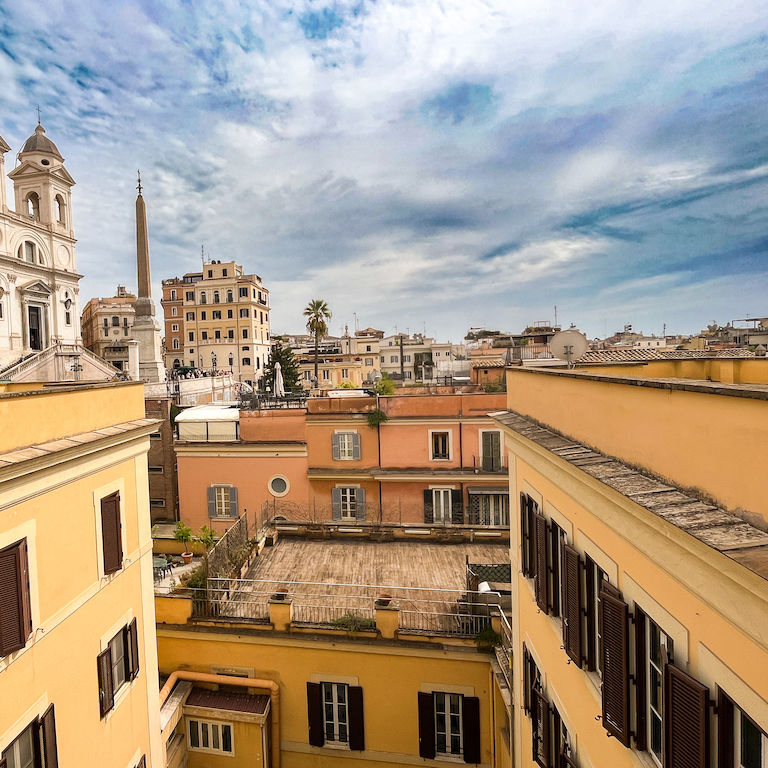
- Motto: Perseverantia Vincit (Latin)
- Motto in English: "Perseverance Conquers"
- Type: Public research university
- Established: 1966; 60 years ago
- Dean: Emilia Zankina
- Location: Rome, Italy; 41°54′51″N 12°28′20″E
- Campus: Urban
- Other campuses: Philadelphia; Ambler; Harrisburg; Tokyo
- Colors: Cherry and white
- Website: https://rome.temple.edu/

Temple University Rome is one of the two international campuses (the other being Temple University, Japan Campus) of Temple University, based in Philadelphia, Pennsylvania, United States. Located in the center of Rome, Italy, it was founded in 1966, making it one of the oldest American university programs in Italy.

Its first cohort consisted of 24 undergraduates and 12 graduate students in the fall of 1966. In 1990, the campus established the Gallery of Art, an exhibition space for guest artists, faculty, and students. The space has forged relationships with commercial galleries, the Roman art academies and the general art community.

In the Fall of 2024, Temple Rome moved to a new, central location, establishing its new campus at Piazza di Spagna—one of the most notable landmarks in the Eternal City and a UNESCO World Heritage Site. Facilities include state-of-the-art classrooms, art studios and an art gallery, a science lab, a conference center, a library, and open-air terraces and a courtyard for events. Additionally, it will feature full disability access and a new 50-bed residence hall, offering a true campus experience in the heart of Rome.

Temple Rome offers a variety of programs in various disciplines, including internships. The Temple Rome Entry Year Program allows undergraduate students to complete the first year of their studies at Temple's campus in Rome, and then finish the remaining three years of their degree at Temple's Main Campus in Philadelphia, Pennsylvania or its Japan Campus in Tokyo. Temple Rome is also open to matriculated students at colleges and universities across the U.S. From 2019 to 2024, colleges and universities that sent students to Temple Rome included Cornell University, Duke University, and Harvard University.
