= Cecil B. Moore, Philadelphia =

Cecil B. Moore
- Neighborhood of Philadelphia
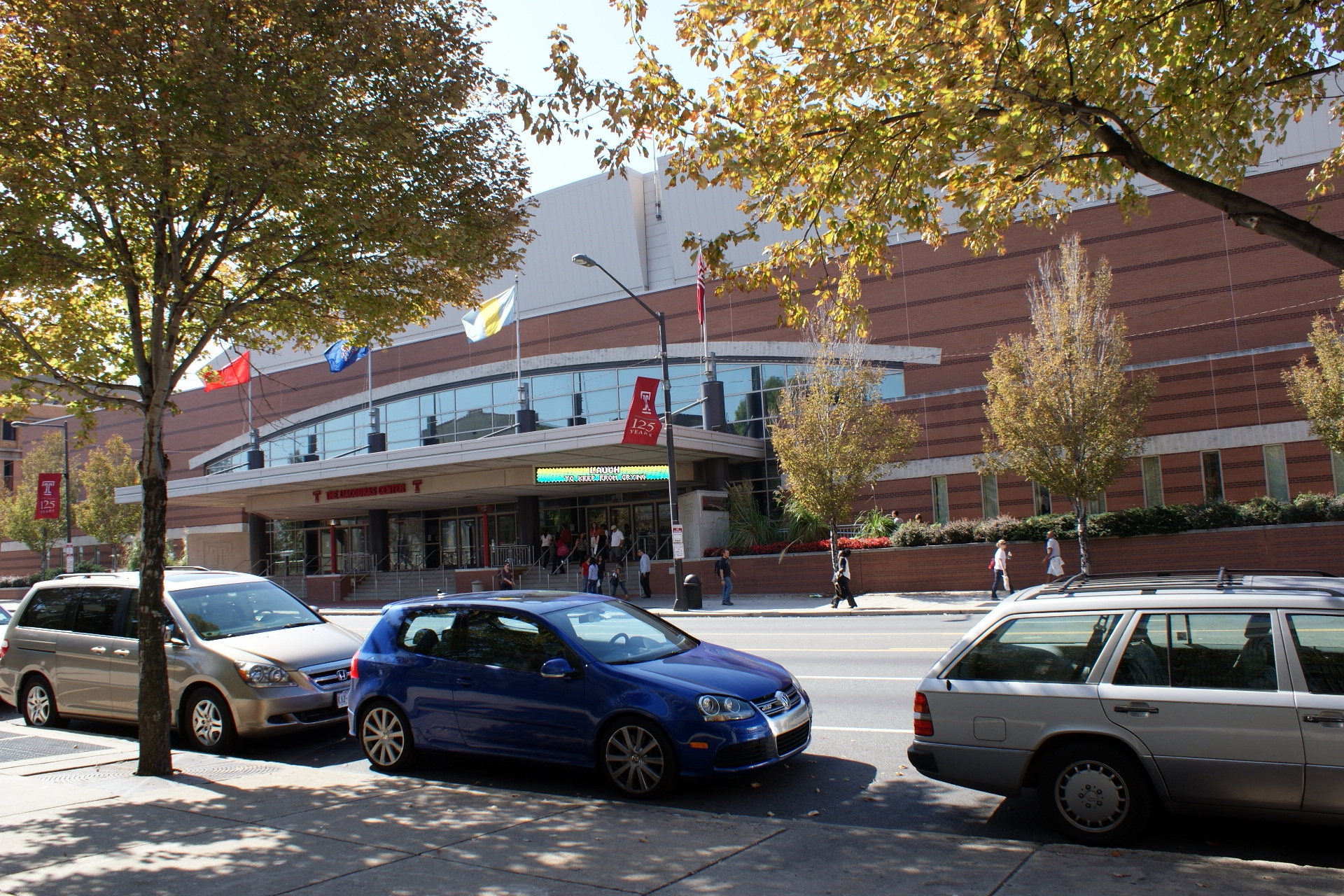
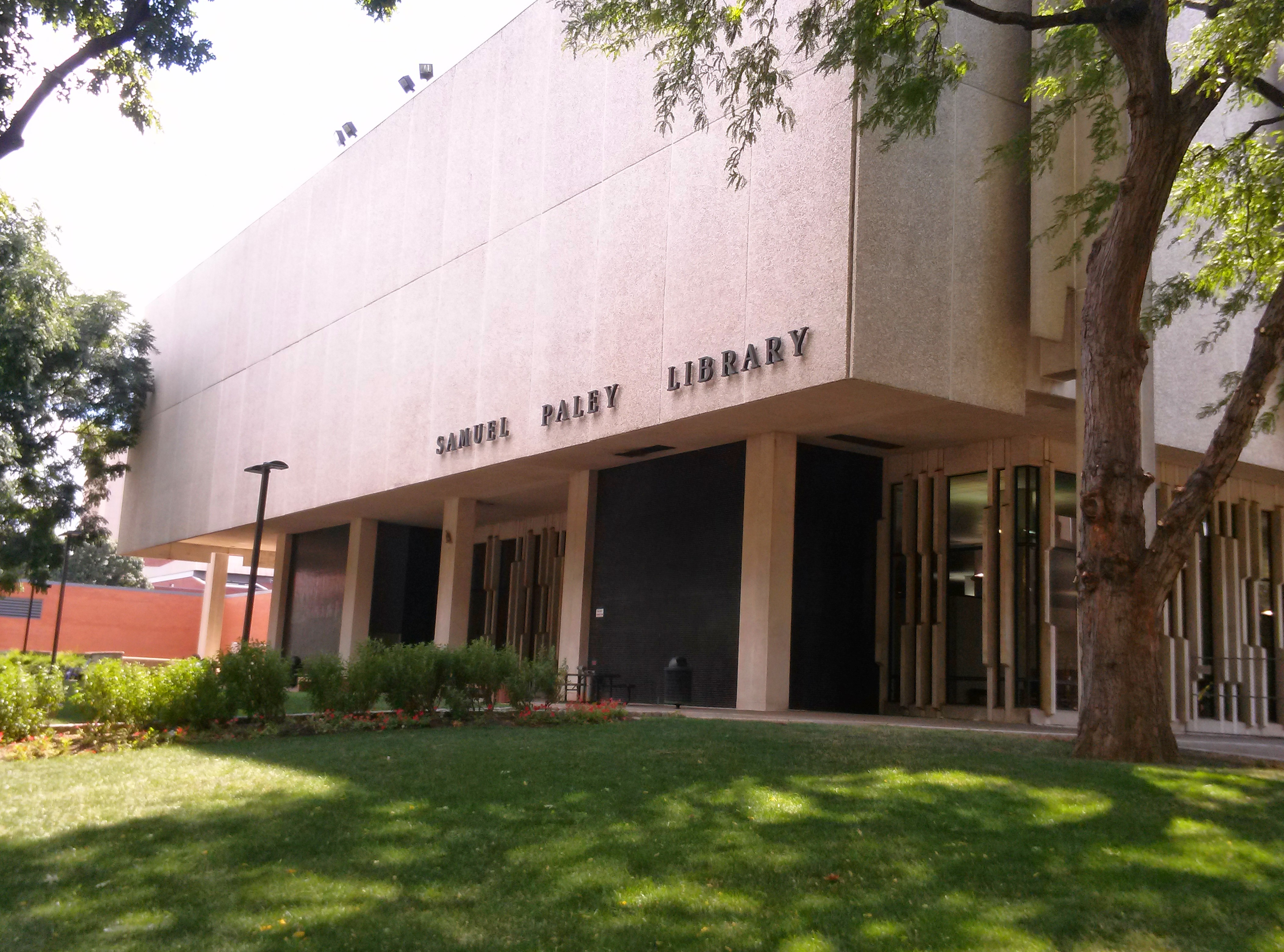
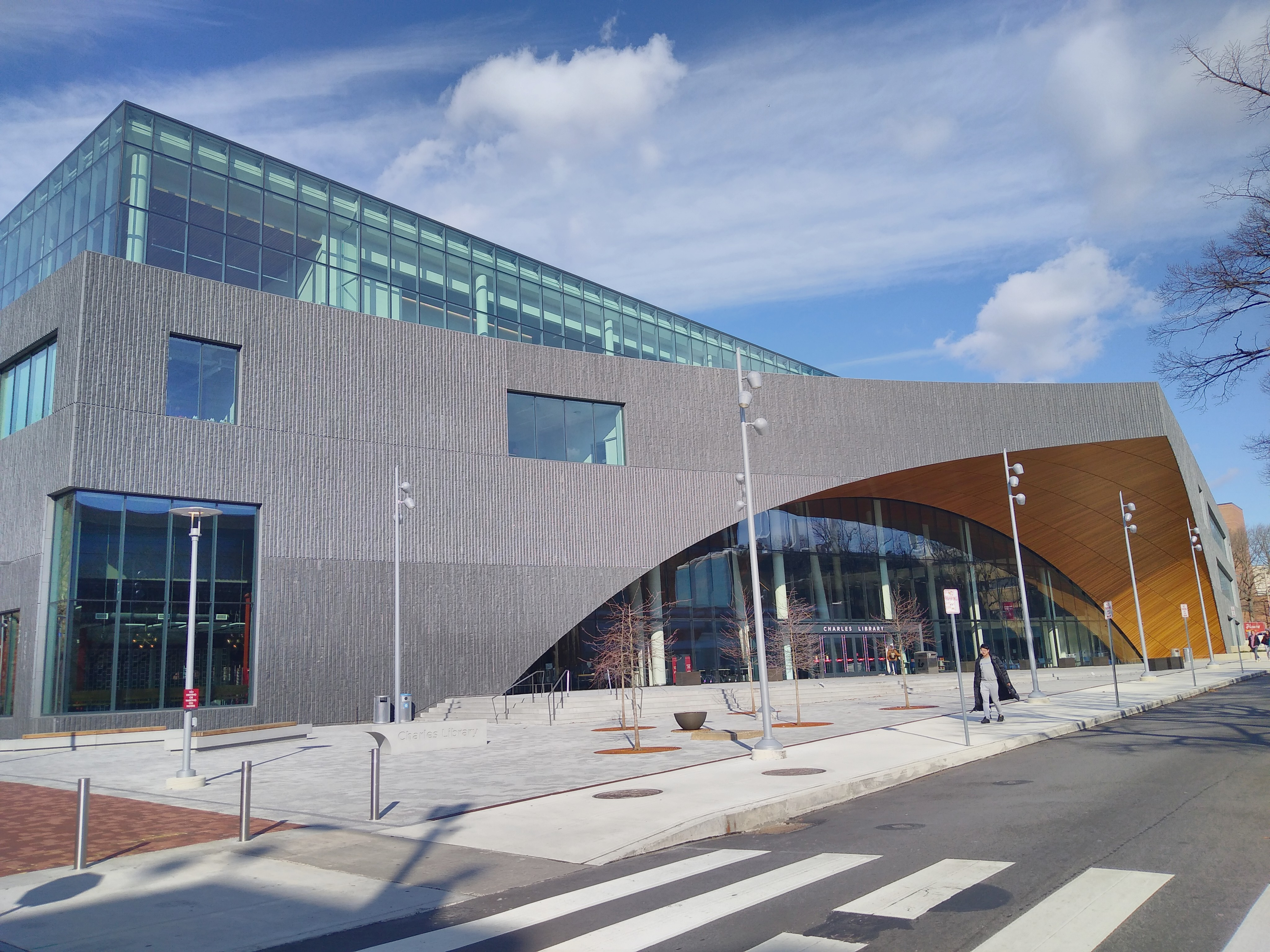
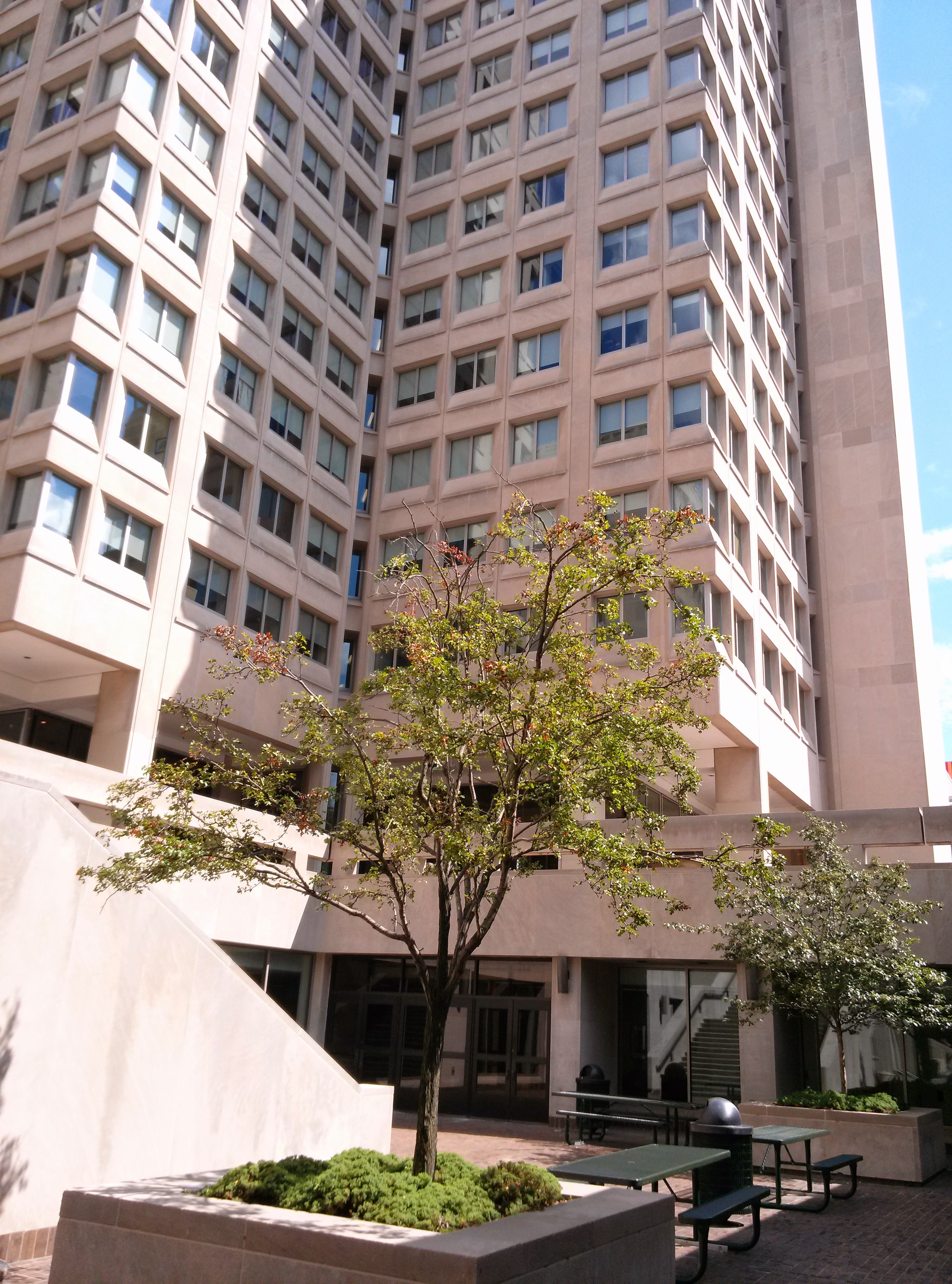
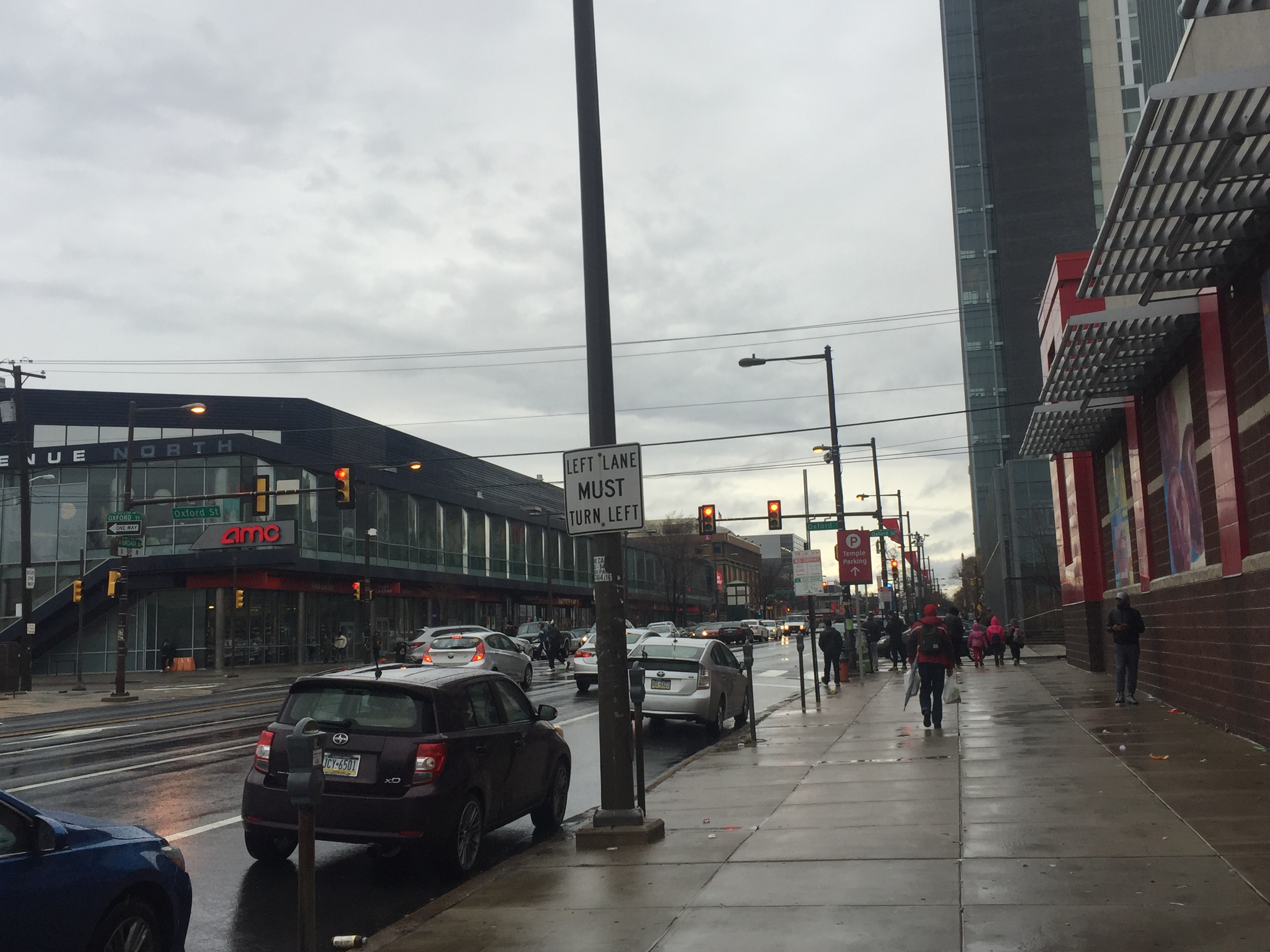
- Temple University's Liacouras Center Paley Library Charles Library on the Campus of Temple University Mazur Hall Broad Street with Temple University's Morgan Hall on the right hand side.

- Location within Philadelphia
- Country: United States
- State: Pennsylvania
- County: Philadelphia
- City: Philadelphia

Population (2014)
  - Total: 37,289
- ZIP code: 19121
- Area codes: 215, 267, and 445

Cecil B. Moore is a neighborhood in the North Philadelphia section of the city of Philadelphia, Pennsylvania, United States, named after the late Philadelphia-based civil rights attorney and politician Cecil B. Moore. The district is loosely arranged around the main campus of Temple University. The neighborhood has gentrified due to an influx of Temple students during the past several years. The controversial term "Templetown" was coined by former Temple president Peter J. Liacouras, but has only recently come into wide use after a real estate development company adopted the name. Cecil B. Moore Avenue is a major east-west street running through the neighborhood, where it intersects with N. Broad Street in Temple’s campus.

== Demographics ==
The neighborhood consists of 17,012 males and 20,277 females. The median age is 25.49. The population has increased 6.7% from 2000 to 2014 and 1.1% from 2010 to 2014 to reach a total population of 37,289 in 2014.

== Boundaries and population ==
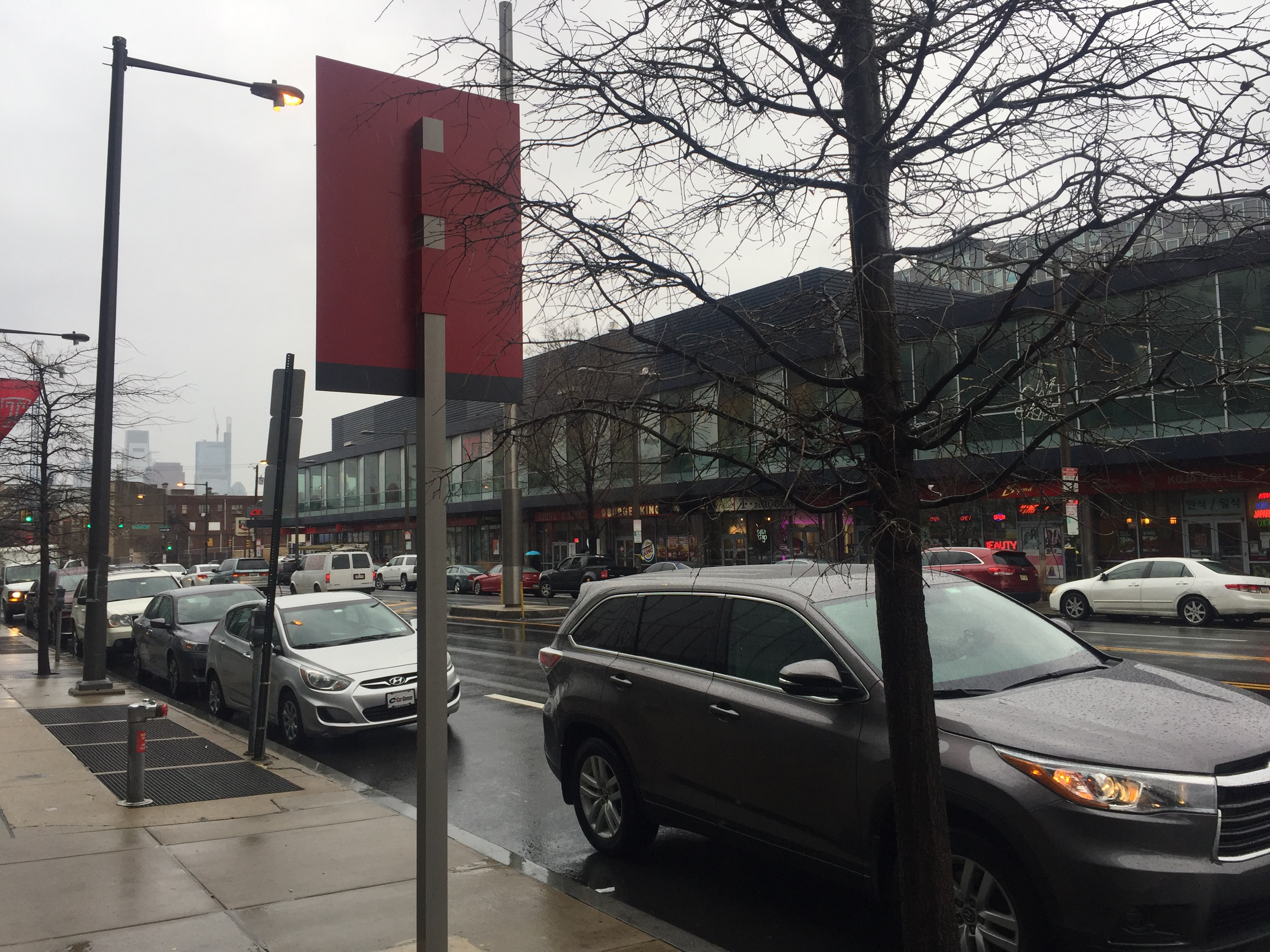
Cecil B. Moore shopping district, with Philadelphia skyline in the background

The Cecil B. Moore neighborhood extends from Broad Street to the east, Susquehanna Avenue to the north, 24th Street to the west, and Girard Avenue to the south. The majority of its native residents are African Americans and Puerto Ricans, although Temple students of all races are a growing presence, with many living off campus and in the Cecil B. Moore community.

Recently the renaissance of Progress Plaza shopping center can mainly be attributed to the economic impact of students within these borders, furthering Temple's expansion further south down broad street towards Center City. Furthermore, the purchase of the closed-down William Penn High School by the university, after redevelopment, will extend the footprint even further down Broad street towards Girard.

== History ==
=== Golden Strip Era and the Columbia Ave Riots ===
From the 1940s through the 1960s, the area was popular amongst jazz fans. There was a large concentration of jazz clubs and dance halls along Cecil B Moore Avenue, then known as Columbia Avenue, leading the street to be known colloquially as "the Golden Strip".

In August 1964 police officers got into an argument with a black woman upon asking her to move her car from 23rd Street and Columbia Avenue. The argument escalated into the officers physically removing the woman from her car, drawing attention from the surrounding residents. Rumors soon spread about the altercation, with many people believing that a pregnant black woman had been killed by police, and this culminated in the 1964 Philadelphia Race Riot.

=== Renaming of Columbia Avenue to Cecil B Moore ===
In 1987, Columbia Avenue was renamed in honor of Cecil Bassett Moore (April 2, 1915 – February 13, 1979). Moore was a Philadelphia lawyer, civil rights activist and president of the local NAACP, and is best remembered for leading a picket against Girard College which led to the desegregation of that school. He was also a champion of a wide range of causes central to the Civil Rights Movement, including integration of trade unions, and increased political and economic representation for poor African-Americans. One major reason for renaming this street in particular after him is because of his leadership and calls for peace during the Columbia Avenue riot.

=== Templetown naming controversy ===
The Templetown nickname was widely used due to the influence of Temple University. The name, however, was not approved by either Temple University or its surrounding community. In October 2014 the Templetown name began to experience backlash from longtime local residents that became disgruntled due to 60 years of economic stagnation along the Cecil B. Moore corridor. The complaints were strong enough that Google removed the name in favor of the Cecil B. Moore name.

== Local institutions ==
=== Education ===
- Temple University (39,515)
- Girard College (Prep) (300)

== Transportation ==
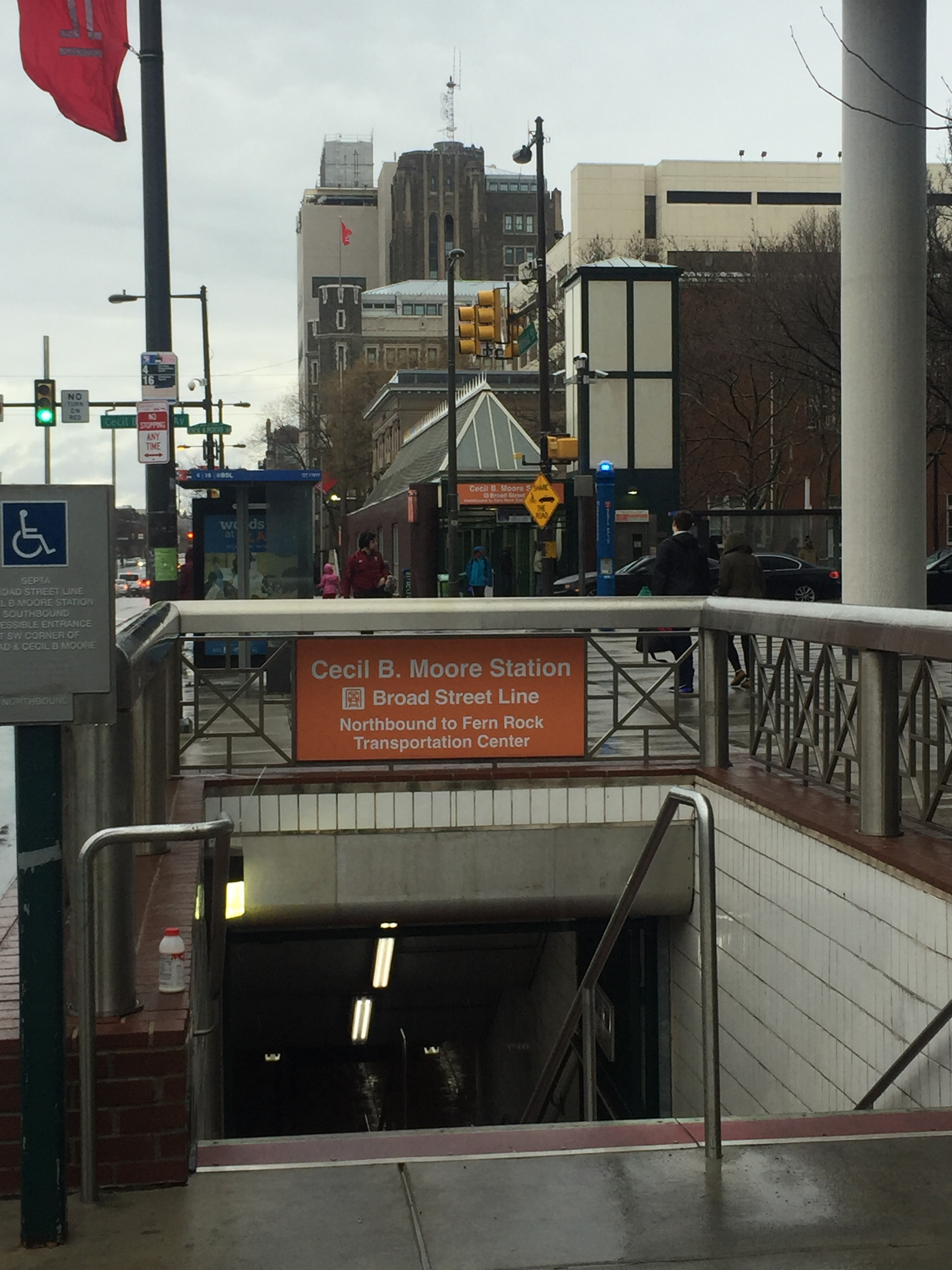
The Broad Street Line station with Temple University visible in the background.

The Cecil B. Moore neighborhood is served by two railroad stations:

- Cecil B. Moore transit station by the Broad Street Line
- North Broad and Temple University stations by the SEPTA Regional Rail

Cecil B. Moore Avenue stretches from Fairmount Park in the Strawberry Mansion Section of Philadelphia to its eastern terminus at Frankford Avenue in Kensington intersecting Broad Street (PA 611) at Temple University.

== See also ==
- List of college towns
