= Cecil Calvert =

Cecil Calvert may refer to:

- Cecil Calvert, 2nd Baron Baltimore (1605–1675), first proprietor of Maryland
- Cecil Calvert (politician), Unionist politician in Northern Ireland
