= Cecil Cowles =

American pianist and composer

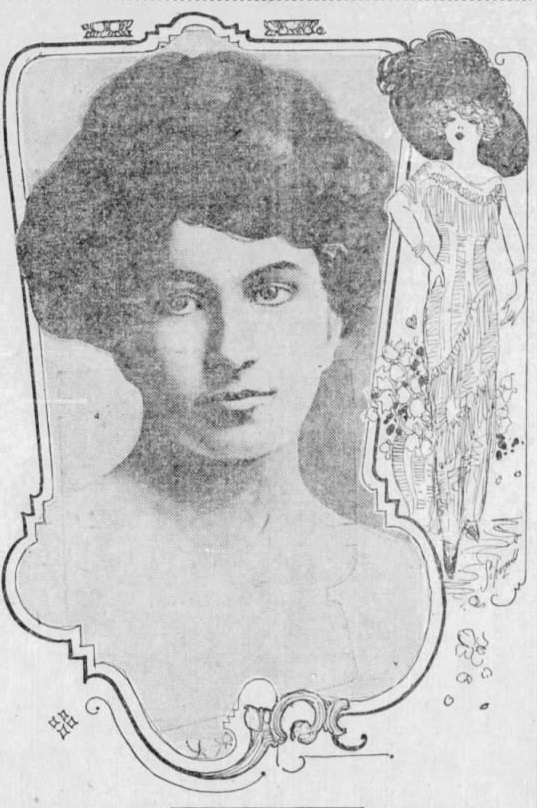
An illustration of Cecil Cowles from 1911.

Cecil Marion Cowles (c. 1893 – March 28, 1968) was an American pianist and composer. She was a child prodigy and played the piano as well as composed music. Cowles made her professional debut in a musical in 1911.

== Personal life ==
Cowles was known as a child prodigy, making her pianist debut at a concert when she was 8 years old. Her mother was a well known musician and her father had the ability to play exactly what he heard, just like Cowles was able to do from a young age. She studied at the Von Einde School in New York and later at the Von Meyernick School in California. Her piano instructors were Hugo Mansfeldt and Sigismund Stojowski, with her composition being taught by Carl Deis.

== Career ==
On February 8, 1907, Thomas Nunan of The San Francisco Examiner wrote that she is not a prodigy, but rather a genius. At the time of the article's publication, Cowles was 14 years old and had written 24 compositions, including one of an opera and a ragtime piece. The night before the San Francisco Examiner article was published, she played the piano at Lyric Hall to a full audience. There was a reception held for Cowles at the end of her recital which had most of the audience attend, an affair that lasted for over 30 minutes. On November 22, 1910, Cowles played her own compositions at a Century Club Music Hall concert and the event was called "one of the memorable music affairs of the season" by The San Francisco Call. At the concert, her songs were sung by "distinguished soprano soloist" Helen Colburn Heath. Cowles made her first professional appearance on August 20, 1911, at the Savoy Theatre as a duchess in the musical The Rich Mr. Guggenhelmer, in which she sang one of her own songs.

Cowles has an entry in the book Fifty local prodigies, 1906–1940, a selection of prodigies from San Francisco. San Francisco Examiner reporter Thomas Nunan wrote, "Prodigies are numerous; they are found everywhere. But Cecil Cowles is a genius, and children of her class are few." Nunan also wrote a November 23, 1910, article for the same newspaper, stating that Cowles is a genius at 17 years old. People, including Cowles, asked Nunan for his opinion on a comparison between her and Liza Lehmann which Nunan's opinion was that

Miss Cowles is a far better pianist than is the English composer. But the latter knows thoroughly the grammar of music, and the rhetoric of it, too, and she knows exactly what did Omar meant, and until our young composer is schooled in these things she must not expect to outclass the greatest woman of English song.
