= Cecil (Japanese band) =

Japanese pop music group

- Origin: Kajigaya, Japan
- Genres: Neo-acoustic; Soft rock
- Years active: 2000-2006
- Label: Berry Records
- Past members: Yukichi; Batayam; Kunie Kanbara; Yoshie Kanbara; Taichi Ohira; Sato Goou; Yusuke Kawaguchi

Cecil (Japanese: セシル, stylized as CECIL) is a Japanese pop music group, best known for their song, "Super Shomin Car" appearing in the film Kamikaze Girls.

While the band has never formally disbanded, no activity from the band has taken place since 2006.

On August 19, 2026, The EP "Tiger Lily" released in 2004 was released digitally by each music distribution service, and Taichi Ohira announced a comment on the restart.

On October 21 of the same year, the sound source of "Namida no Tsubomi" broadcast on NHK's "Minna no Uta" in 2005 was released.

== Band members ==
- Yukichi (ゆきち, Yukichi) - Songwriting and vocals
- Batayam (ばたやん, Batayan) - Lyrics and artwork. She died in April 2018 due to heart failure.
- Kunie Kanbara (カンバラクニエ, Kanbara Kunie) - Illustration and design.
- Yoshie Kanbara (カンバラヨシエ, Kanbara Yoshi) - Kanbara Kunie's sister.
- Taichi Ohira (大平太一, Ōhira Taichi) - Composition, arrangement, guitar and bass.
- Goou Sato (佐藤五魚, Sato Goou) - Keyboard, Drum
- Yusuke Kawaguchi (川口佑介, Kawaguchi Yusuke) - Recording engineer.

After the album "CINEMA SCOPE", four women of the Yukichi, Batayam, and Kanbara sisters were credited as members of CECIL, and Ohira, Sato, and Kawaguchi participated as staff.

== Discography ==
=== Albums ===
- Natsudokei (夏時計) (August 10, 2000)
- Rikka (December 8, 2000)
- Cheek (October 26, 2001)
- Natsudokei (夏時計) -2002 ENCORE EDITION- (July 19, 2002)
- CECILMANIA#203 (July 19, 2002)
- CINEMA SCOPE (February 13, 2003)
- Tiger Lily (タイガー・リリィ) (March 24, 2004)
  Digital delivery on August 19, 2026.

=== Singles ===
- Super "shomin" car (23 April 2003)

=== Online Releases ===
- Namida no Tsubomi (涙の蕾) (2005）
  NHK "Minna no Uta" insert song. The animation illustrations in the program were produced by Kunie Kanbara.
  The distribution version is a full-size version.
- Fruits Basket (フルーツバスケット) (2006)
- Yakan Hikō (夜間飛行) (2006)
