= Cecil Moore (architect) =

Architect in Tucson, Arizona (1919–2009)

- Born: Cecil H. Moore; 1913
- Died: 2009 (aged 95–96); Tucson, Arizona
- Known for: Art; Architect
- Movement: Art deco, pueblo revival, Streamline Moderne, Spanish Colonial Revival

Cecil Moore (1913-2009) was a prolific architect, developer and general contractor who left his mark on the built environment of Tucson, Arizona.

== Architecture in Tucson ==
Moore arrived in Southern Arizona in 1926 and by his early twenties, had worked for the two most significant architects in Tucson at that time, Merritt Starkweather and Henry Jaastad. Though not formally educated in architecture, he became a registered architect in the state of Arizona in 1936 after starting his own firm a year earlier. Moore was responsible for countless single-family residences in the prestigious El Encanto Estate, Colonia Solona, San Clemente and El Montevideo subdivisions; multi-family residential buildings, including the former 12-unit Spanish Colonial Revival Gamma Apartments (1508-30 E. Sixth Street, most recently used as an administrative annex for Parking and Transportation to the University of Arizona and demolished in 1997); an early International-styled four-plex currently called Victoria Apartments, at 2811 E. Sixth Street, the architecturally progressive Anshei Israel Synagogue on 5th Street and Campbell Avenue (demolished 2014), as well as the development and numerous residences in the planned subdivision, Encanto Park (bounded roughly by Speedway on the north, Miramonte on the west, Sixth Street on the south and Palo Verde on the east). Some of his residential work was photographed by famed Architectural photographer Maynard Parker.

== Styles ==
Moore quickly diversified his building repertoire and participation in the building process. For many buildings, Moore worked through his Moore Building Company in which he was both the architect and general contractor, allowing him more control over the design process and budget. Through his relationships with influential Tucson developers, such as Al Kivel, he designed and built many shopping centers, including the original El Rancho Shopping Center (currently the remodeled Whole Foods) on East Speedway, El Con Shopping Center (with Nicholas Sakellar) and Park Mall, as well as Art Deco/Streamline gas stations including the Art Deco "Ice Cream Cone" building now occupied by D & D Accounting at 648 N. Stone Avenue, the current Sparkle Cleaners at 2-16 W. Drachman, and numerous tourist auto courts all along Benson Highway, South Sixth Avenue and the Miracle Mile. He did two buildings for Southern Arizona Bank and the Anshei Israel synagogue was his only religious building.

Moore experimented with a variety of architectural styles, including Spanish Colonial Revival, Italianate, Art Deco/Streamline Moderne, Contemporary Ranch and even Pueblo Revival. He also experimented with building technologies applied to the desert climate including adobe masonry, radiant floor heating (as used in the Anshei Israel Synagogue), and in the case of the un-built Beacon Tourist Court, a massive cool tower in the form of a cylindrical Streamline beacon complete with steel fins to accentuate its stylistic vocabulary of height and curvilinearity.

== Legacy ==
Cecil Moore designed approximately 350 projects over his 40-year career, almost all in Tucson. His mark on Tucson is subtle, but one which is mature and appreciated for its design sense, stylistic variety and experimentation. Moore died in Tucson in 2009
