= Cecil Banes-Walker =

English athlete & rugby union player

Personal information
- Full name: Frederick Cecil Banes-Walker
- Born: 19 June 1888; North Petherton, Somerset, England
- Died: 9 May 1915 (aged 26); Aubers Ridge, near Fleurbaix, Pas-de-Calais, France
- Batting: Right-handed
- Role: Batsman

Domestic team information
- Years: Team
- 1914: Somerset
- First-class debut: 9 July 1914 Somerset v Kent
- Last First-class: 31 August 1914 Somerset v Essex

Career statistics
Competition	First-class
Matches	5
Runs scored	172
Batting average	19.11
100s/50s	0/0
Top score	40
Catches/stumpings	3
- Source: CricketArchive, 26 October 2009

Frederick Cecil Banes-Walker (19 June 1888 – 9 May 1915) was an English first-class cricketer who played five matches for Somerset County Cricket Club. He also played rugby for Clifton Rugby Football Club, and hockey for Gloucestershire. He was killed in action during the First World War.

== Cricket career ==
Known as Cecil Banes-Walker, he made his name at Long Ashton Cricket Club. He made his first-class debut in July 1914 in Gravesend against Kent. Batting at number nine, he made 5 and 28 in a nine wicket loss. For his next match against Yorkshire, he was promoted to number three as Somerset fell for just 90 runs, chasing Yorkshire's 372. Following on, Banes-Walker remained not out on 15, and Somerset lost by an innings. His home debut brought another loss, Worcestershire the recipients this time, claiming a ten wicket victory, Banes-Walker's 8 and 23 while batting at number eight doing little to affect the match. His highest score came against Hampshire, as he hit 40 in the first innings at the County Ground, Southampton. Somerset lost by an innings again, and Banes-Walker finished his first-class career win-less as Essex eased to a ten-wicket victory in his final match.

== Military service ==
On the outbreak of the First World War in the summer of 1914, Banes-Walker enlisted in the Gloucestershire Regiment as a private, but shortly after was gazetted into the 3rd (Militia) Battalion, Devonshire Regiment as a second lieutenant (on probation) on 7 October 1914. He later completed a machine-gun course, and was attached to the 2nd Battalion, Devonshire Regiment as a machine-gun officer in March 1915. On 9 May 1915 the British launched the Battle of Aubers Ridge. The 2nd Devons were not involved in the assault, but seem to have been ordered into the front British trenches in support. The battalion's war diary records that as they were moving up, they came under heavy German artillery and machine-gun fire, and that between 6:45 and 7:30 Banes-Walker was killed, along with another second lieutenant. Four other second lieutenants were injured at the same time. On 19 May, The Bridgwater Mercury reported that his father received intelligence that his son had been killed. Banes-Walker was buried at Le Trou Aid Post Cemetery, Fleurbaix, France.
