= Lily Curry =

Lily Curry was an American writer, translator and newspaper journalist, who at one point styled herself Lily Curry Tyner. She also wrote under the pseudonym Cecil Charles, and may have anonymously written of herself as Marie Desquez. A pupil, friend and possible lover of the Cuban national hero José Martí, she was the first to translate his verse into English.

== Life ==
Between 1889 and 1891 Curry attended José Martí's classes in New York City. During the 1898 Spanish–American War she was a war correspondent in Cuba.

The translator Manuel Tellechea identifies Curry as the likely author of 'Marti as a Lover', an anonymous article of 1898.

== Works ==
As Lily Curry

- A Bohemian Tragedy. Philadelphia, Pennsylvania: T.B. Peterson & Brothers, 1886.
- Anti-Syllabus : Adapted from Dr. Hermann Krasser. N.l. : John Swinton, 1885.
- Drops of Blood. New York: J.S. Ogilvie & Company, 1887.

Anon.

- 'Marti as a Lover', 1898.

As Cecil Charles

- Tuya, Other Verses and Translations from José Martí. New York: J.E. Richardson, 1898.
- Miss Sylvester's Marriage. New York: The Smart Set Publishing Co., 1903.
- Rudyard Kipling: His life and works. London: J. Hewetson, 1911.
