= Hotel Cecil (Tangier, Morocco) =

Hotel in Tangier, Morocco

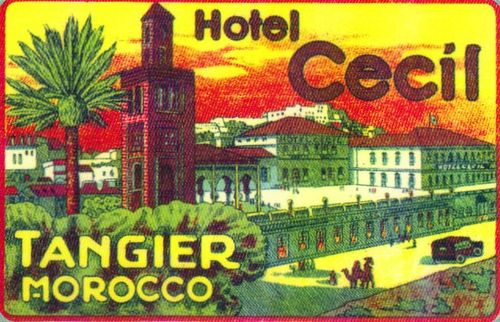
Hotel Cecil Luggage Label, Circa, 1920

The Hotel Cecil is one of the oldest hotels in Tangier, Morocco. The hotel was built in 1865. Hotel Cecil is scheduled to be rebuilt. It was originally located on Avenue d'Espagne, number 11, now Avenue Mohammed VI.
