= Cecil Tremayne Buller =

Canadian artist

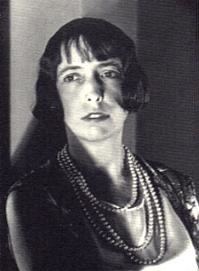
- Cecil Buller in 1929
- Born: September 15, 1886; Montreal, Canada
- Died: September 29, 1973 (aged 87); Montreal, Canada
- Known for: Illustrator, graphic artist

Cecil Tremayne Buller (September 15, 1886 – September 29, 1973) was a Canadian artist.

== Career ==
She was born in Montreal and studied with William Brymner at the Art Association of Montreal and at the Art Students League in New York City. Buller went to Paris in 1912 with Edwin Holgate, studying there with Maurice Denis. In 1916, she went to London to study printmaking with Noel Rooke at the Central School of Art and Design. She met her future husband John J. A. Murphy there; the couple had settled in New York City by 1918.

In 1929, she produced a series of wood engravings for her book Song of Solomon. She also provided illustrations for Cantique des cantiques published in Paris in 1931. In 1945, she received the Pennell Prize from the Library of Congress; she received the Audubon Society Award in 1947 and 1953 and the National Academy of Design Graphic Art Award in 1949.

Buller moved to Montreal in 1961 and later died there at the age of 87.

Her work is included in the collections of the Musée national des beaux-arts du Québec, British Museum, the Library of Congress, the New York Public Library, the Metropolitan Museum of Art, Bibliothèque nationale de France in Paris and the National Gallery of Canada.

== Legacy ==
Buller's work also was included in The Artist Herself, an exhibition co-curated by Alicia Boutilier and Tobi Bruce who also co-edited the book/catalogue.
