= Cecil Hotel (Alexandria) =

Hotel in Alexandria, Egypt

Coordinates: 31.2008°N 29.8984°E

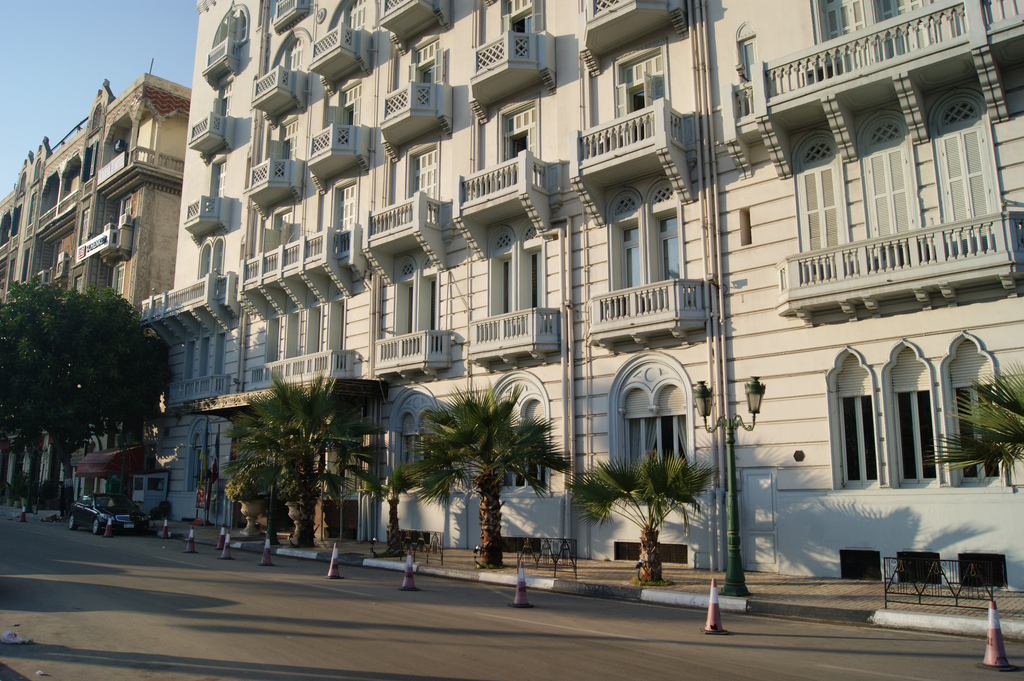
- Interactive map of the Cecil Hotel area

General information
- Location: Alexandria, Egypt, 16, Saad Zagloul Square
- Opening: 1929
- Owner: Legacy Hotels
- Operator: Legacy Hotels

Other information
- Number of rooms: 82

The four-star Cecil Hotel in Alexandria, Egypt, was built as the Cecil Hotel in 1929 by the French-Egyptian Jewish Metzger family as a romantic hotel, at Saad Zaghloul Park where Cleopatra's needles had been, in front of the Corniche. Since 2014, the hotel has been operated under H World International's Steigenberger Hotels brand.

== History ==
Author Somerset Maugham stayed here, as did Winston Churchill and Al Capone. The hotel was seized by the Egyptian government after the revolution in 1952, and five years later the Metzger family was expelled from the country.

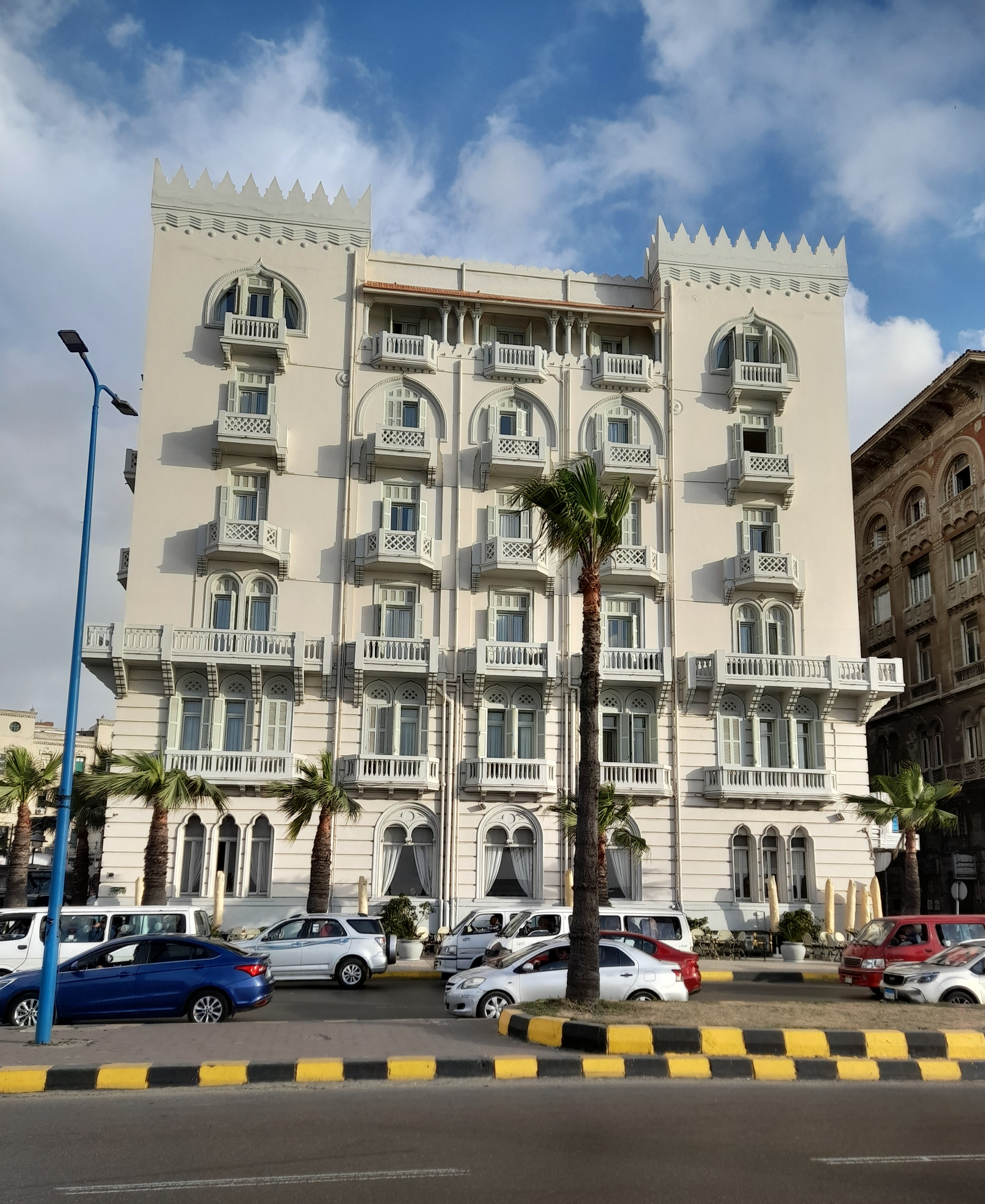
View of the hotel

In 2007, after a lengthy court battle, legal ownership of the hotel was returned to the Metzger family, who subsequently sold it to the Egyptian government. This hotel appears in The Alexandria Quartet, written by Lawrence Durrell and the novel Miramar by Naguib Mahfuz. The hotel operated for many years as part of Accor's Sofitel chain under the name Sofitel Cecil Alexandria Hotel, until it joined the Steigenberger Hotels chain in October 2014, becoming the Steigenberger Cecil Hotel Alexandria. On 20 December 2023, Icon Company, a subsidiary of Talaat Moustafa Group, acquired 51% of Legacy Hotels Company, which owns the hotel.
