= List of A Song of Ice and Fire characters =

Cast of the novels by George R. R. Martin

George R. R. Martin's A Song of Ice and Fire saga features a large cast of characters. The series follows three interwoven plotlines: a dynastic war for control of Westeros by several families; the rising threat of the Others beyond the northern border of Westeros; and the ambition of Daenerys Targaryen, the exiled heir of the previous ruling dynasty. In Martin's fictional world, the Great Houses of Westeros represent the Seven Kingdoms which exist on the continent: the North, the Iron Islands, the Vale of Arryn, the Westerlands, the Stormlands, the Reach, and Dorne. A massive wall of ice and old magic separates the Seven Kingdoms from the largely unmapped area in the most northern portion of the continent.

Each chapter is narrated in the third-person limited point of view through the eyes of a single character. Beginning with nine POV characters in A Game of Thrones (1996), a total of thirty-one such characters have narrated over the course of the first five volumes of the series.

== House Stark ==
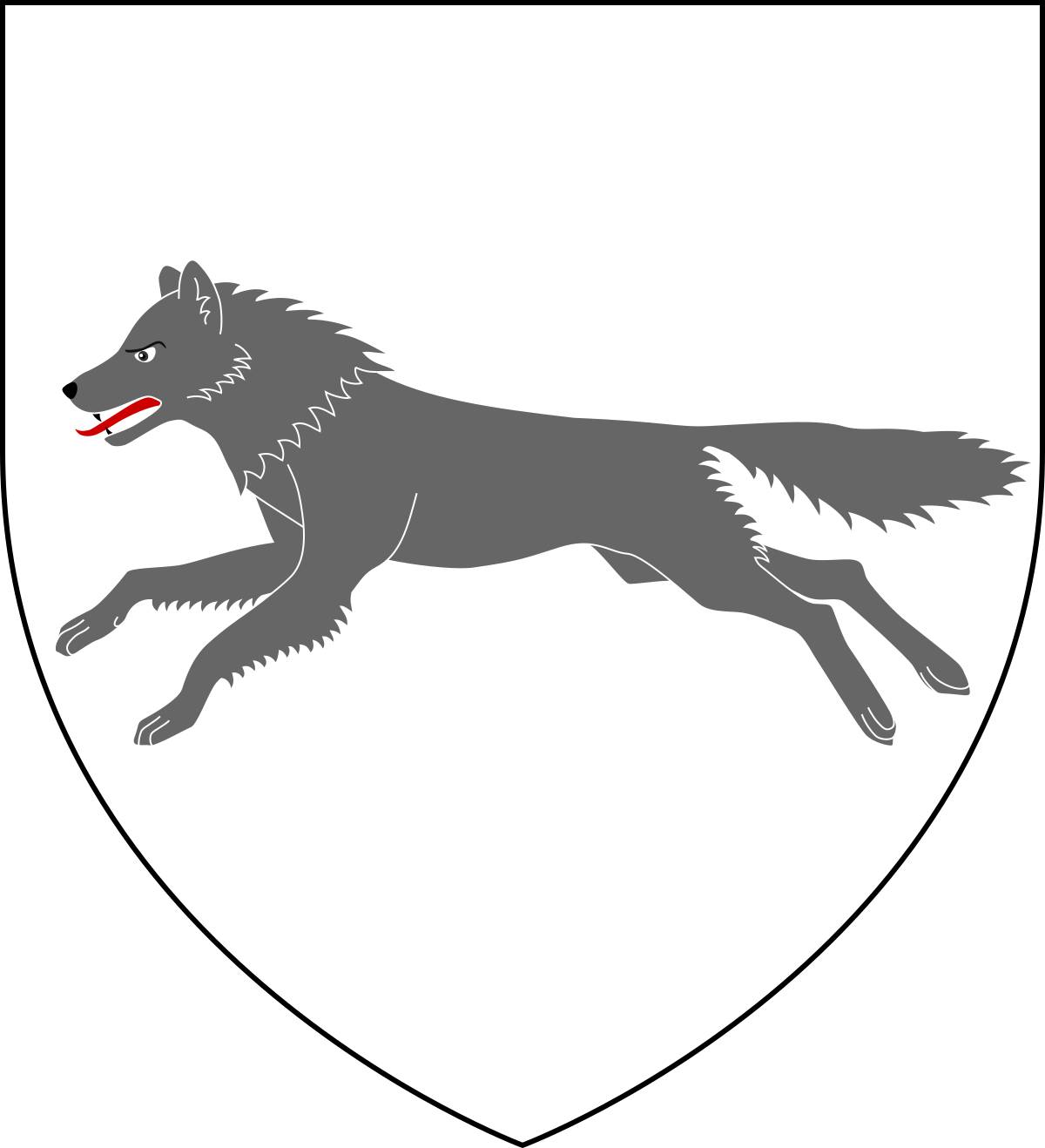
Coat of arms of House Stark (Argent, a direwolf courant cendrée)

House Stark is described as one of the Great Houses of the Seven Kingdoms and the principal house of the North. Its seat is at Winterfell, one of the oldest castles in the Seven Kingdoms. Its coat of arms displays a grey direwolf running on a white field, and its words are Winter is Coming. Bastards born in the North are given the surname "Snow". House Stark ruled as the Kings of the North for thousands of years until House Targaryen conquered Westeros, after which the Starks were known as the Lords of Winterfell and Wardens of the North. For prizing honor and devotion to duty, House Stark is the closest of the noble houses to heroism.

Descended from Bran the Builder, the architect of the Wall, House Stark is the leading First Men dynasty in Westeros because of its successful resistance to the Andal invasion. It became the ruling house in the North after defeating the Barrow Kings and gradually unifying the region into one kingdom, competing for dominance with House Bolton of the Dreadfort, the second most powerful Northern house known for its sinister flaying tradition. Its expanding dominion would also repel incursions of pirates and raiders and secure control of the Neck through its vassals of House Reed. It would also gain a new vassal from the Reach after House Manderly was exiled, granting House Stark White Harbor in exchange for protection against piracy.

House Stark would eventually unite the North and repel the Ironborn, making an enemy of House Hoare and gaining a new vassal in House Mormont of Bear Island, just as the Andals arrived in Westeros and began conquering every kingdom the First Men had built and converting them to the Faith of the Seven. The Starks made peace with the Boltons, finally unified the North, and began opposing the Andals as one force instead of as individual houses like the rest of the First Men, sacking Andalos and driving them back from the fortress of Moat Cailin. House Stark would lose its strength at sea after a failed voyage across the Sunset Sea ended with all its ships being torched. House Stark would also aid the Night's Watch several times against wildling raids, defeating many Kings-beyond-the-Wall, and forming a second branch, House Karstark.

During Aegon's conquest of Westeros, the Starks intended to oppose the Targaryens, unwilling to bow to an outsider, but King Torrhen Stark knelt after hearing of the scorching of Harrenhal and the devastating outcome of the Field of Fire caused by the Targaryen dragons. The result was his becoming the first Warden of the North and forming a marriage alliance with House Arryn to keep the realm together.

Over the course of the novels, the Starks are scattered by the War of the Five Kings, and the fate of the House remains uncertain, as most characters believe that all the legitimate Stark sons are dead.

Descendants of Rickard Stark

Rickard | Lyarra
Brandon | Catelyn; Tully | Eddard | Lyanna (Note: In season 7 of the TV series Game of Thrones, Jon is revealed to be the son of Rhaegar Targaryen and Lyanna.) | Benjen
Robb | Jeyne; Westerling | Sansa | Tyrion; Lannister | Arya | Brandon | Rickon | Jon; Snow

=== Family ===
==== Eddard Stark ====
Eddard "Ned" Stark is the Lord of Winterfell, Warden of the North, and briefly serves as Hand of the King to Robert Baratheon. He is executed, by King Joffrey's order, on the steps of the Great Sept of Baelor. He serves as a point-of-view (POV) character for 15 chapters in A Game of Thrones.

==== Catelyn Stark ====
Catelyn Stark (née Tully) is the Lady of Winterfell, wife of Lord Eddard Stark, and mother to his children Robb, Sansa, Arya, Bran, and Rickon. She is the daughter of Lord Hoster Tully of Riverrun, niece to Ser Brynden Tully (also known as the legendary "Blackfish"), and sister to Lysa Arryn of the Vale of Arryn and Edmure Tully. She is murdered during the Red Wedding and later resurrected as an undead, vengeful killer under the name "Lady Stoneheart". She serves as a POV character for 25 chapters throughout A Game of Thrones, A Clash of Kings, and A Storm of Swords.

==== Robb Stark ====
Robb Stark is the eldest child of Eddard and Catelyn Stark and the heir to Winterfell. He is not a POV character, but he appears in the POV chapters of his family members in the first three novels of the series. After his father's arrest and execution, Robb rebels against the Crown and seeks to secede the North from the Seven Kingdoms. Robb is also slain at the Red Wedding alongside his mother.

==== Sansa Stark ====
Sansa Stark is the second child and eldest daughter of Eddard and Catelyn Stark. She serves as a POV character for 24 chapters throughout A Game of Thrones, A Clash of Kings, A Storm of Swords, and A Feast for Crows. Sansa is introduced as beautiful and demure.

==== Arya Stark ====
Arya Stark is the third child and younger daughter of Eddard and Catelyn Stark. She serves as a POV character for 33 chapters throughout A Game of Thrones, A Clash of Kings, A Storm of Swords, A Feast for Crows, and A Dance with Dragons. She is the only character to appear as a POV character in all five published books.

==== Bran Stark ====
Brandon "Bran" Stark is the second son and fourth child of Eddard and Catelyn Stark. He serves as the third-person narrator of twenty-one chapters throughout A Game of Thrones, A Clash of Kings, A Storm of Swords, and A Dance with Dragons. In A Game of Thrones, he witnesses Queen Cersei and her brother Jaime Lannister committing incest, and Jaime pushes Bran out of the window to keep the relationship secret. Bran survives but loses the use of his legs. While comatose, Bran dreams of a three-eyed raven. Slowly, he develops the ability to assume his direwolf Summer's consciousness, making him a warg or skinchanger. After his eldest brother, Robb, is crowned King in the North, Bran becomes Robb's heir and the acting Lord of Winterfell. In A Clash of Kings, Jojen Reed teaches Bran how to use his telepathy correctly and directs him beyond the Wall. In A Dance with Dragons, Bran meets the Three-Eyed Raven: an alias of the last trained clairvoyant.

==== Rickon Stark ====
Rickon Stark is Ned Stark's youngest child and is three years old in A Game of Thrones. When Theon Greyjoy captures Winterfell in A Clash of Kings, Rickon hides in the crypts. After Winterfell is sacked, he and the wildling woman Osha travel through the North. In A Dance with Dragons, he is said to be on an island of cannibals, presumably Skagos.

==== Jon Snow ====
Jon Snow was raised as Ned Stark's illegitimate son and serves as the POV character in 42 chapters throughout A Game of Thrones, A Clash of Kings, A Storm of Swords, and A Dance with Dragons. He shares the Stark family values of honor and strives to remain morally upright and honest, even when forced to act otherwise. He is roughly the same age as Robb and was close with Robb, Bran, and Arya, with his strongest bond seeming to be with Arya, who openly regarded him as her brother. Jon's mother remains unknown, and the mystery of who his mother is has generated significant debate and theorizing within the fandom, with the prevailing theory being that he is the son of Rhaegar Targaryen and Lyanna Stark, thus making him the true heir to the Iron Throne. This theory, while established for his television counterpart, remains unconfirmed in the novels, leaving his mother unresolved in the series. In A Dance with Dragons, Jon is slain by members of the Night's Watch, much like his television counterpart. Unlike his television counterpart, however, the Jon of the novels currently remains dead, with his ultimate fate unknown.

==== Benjen Stark ====
Benjen Stark is Ned Stark's younger brother and a First Ranger of the Night's Watch. He appears briefly at the start of A Game of Thrones, first in Winterfell and then later on the Wall at Castle Black, where he travels with his bastard nephew Jon Snow. Benjen is sent on a mission into the lands beyond the Wall to search for a missing ranging party, but he and his men also disappear. The bodies of two of his men are later found and brought back to Castle Black; they reanimate as undead wights and kill several men before they are destroyed, but no trace of Benjen has yet been found.

==== Lyanna Stark ====
Lyanna Stark is Eddard Stark's younger and only sister. She has been deceased for 14 years at the beginning of A Game of Thrones but is mentioned in every published book in the series. She died at the age of 16 and was said to have been very beautiful by all who knew her as "a child-woman of surpassing loveliness" and "a wild beauty". She was also remembered as being headstrong and for having a touch of the Starks' fabled "wolf blood", and she was one of the best horse-riders in the North. She was betrothed to Robert Baratheon, who was deeply in love with her, but she was unimpressed by Robert's reputation for infidelity. Her life's tales are mainly told through the words of Eddard Stark and Meera Reed (via Bran Stark's viewpoint chapter), with some passing commentaries from other people, such as Barristan Selmy, Cersei Lannister, Roose Bolton, and Kevan Lannister.

During the Tourney at Harrenhal, the greatest tourney in Westerosi history, Lyanna rescued Stark bannerman Howland Reed by beating away three bullying squires. She was later chosen by the eventual jousting champion, Crown Prince Rhaegar Targaryen, as the tourney's "Queen of Love and Beauty". Because Rhaegar was already married, and Lyanna was a maiden betrothed to Robert Baratheon, Rhaegar's wooing of Lyanna was considered an outrageous scandal at the time. One year later, she was said to have been abducted and raped by Rhaegar, triggering a civil war that resulted in the overthrow of House Targaryen. At the end of the war, Eddard and six of his companions ventured to the Tower of Joy within Dorne, where Lyanna was located and guarded by three of the most prominent Kingsguard knightt—the "Sword of the Morning" Ser Arthur Dayne, Ser Oswell Whent, and the "White Bull" Ser Gerold Hightower, the Lord Commander of the Kingsguard. After a fierce skirmish that left everyone except Eddard and Howland dead, Eddard entered the tower and found Lyanna dying in a "bed of blood". Before she died, she asked her brother Eddard to make a promise, something that Eddard regarded as a price he paid that haunted him day and night for 14 years.

Eddard later takes her body home to be entombed in Winterfell's crypt, and installs a stone statue in her likeness in front of her sarcophagus. When he returns, he also brings back a newborn boy named Jon Snow, whom he claims is his own bastard by a woman named Wylla, who was later implied to be a wet nurse serving House Dayne of Starfall. Although Jon Arryn persuaded Robert to marry Cersei Lannister, Robert greatly mourns Lyanna for over a decade, causing great strain in his marriage with Cersei.

==== Jeyne Westerling ====
Jeyne Westerling is the older daughter of Lord Gawen Westerling of the Crag, a Westerlands bannerman of House Lannister. She meets Robb Stark when he is wounded, and falls in love with him during his convalescence. He marries her the next day to preserve her honour, in doing so breaking a marriage contract with House Frey. After Robb departs for the Twins, Jeyne remains in Riverrun and does not witness the massacre. After the Red Wedding, she is granted a royal pardon. In A Feast for Crows, she is openly mourning, and last appears riding to Casterly Rock as a political prisoner.

During the 2014 San Diego Comic Con, George R. R. Martin stated that Jeyne Westerling will appear in the prologue of the sixth book, The Winds of Winter, but did not reveal whether she would be the prologue POV character.

=== Servants and vassals ===
==== Roose Bolton ====
Lord Roose Bolton is a significant vassal of Lord Eddard Stark. His seat is the Dreadfort and his sigil is a flayed human, a homage to the ancient Bolton tradition of flaying enemies. He is nicknamed "the Leech Lord" for regular leechings meant to improve his health. He initially joins Robb Stark's rebellion but later becomes disillusioned when it becomes clear the Starks are losing. This leads him to contact Tywin Lannister and arrange with Walder Frey to betray Robb. At the Red Wedding, Roose personally kills Robb, and is later named Warden of the North by Tywin.

==== Ramsay Bolton ====
Ramsay Snow is the bastard son of Lord Roose Bolton, later legitimized as Ramsay Bolton. He is known as the Bastard of Bolton or the Bastard of the Dreadfort. Ramsay is vicious, ruthless, psychopathic, sadistic, opportunistic, unpredictable, and fearless. He takes great pleasure and pride in torturing others and enthusiastically practices the Bolton custom of flaying their enemies. Roose suspects that Ramsay murdered Roose's legitimate heir and expects that Ramsay will kill all of Roose's future children. He is described as ugly, with blotchy skin and dry, dark hair.

==== Rickard Karstark ====
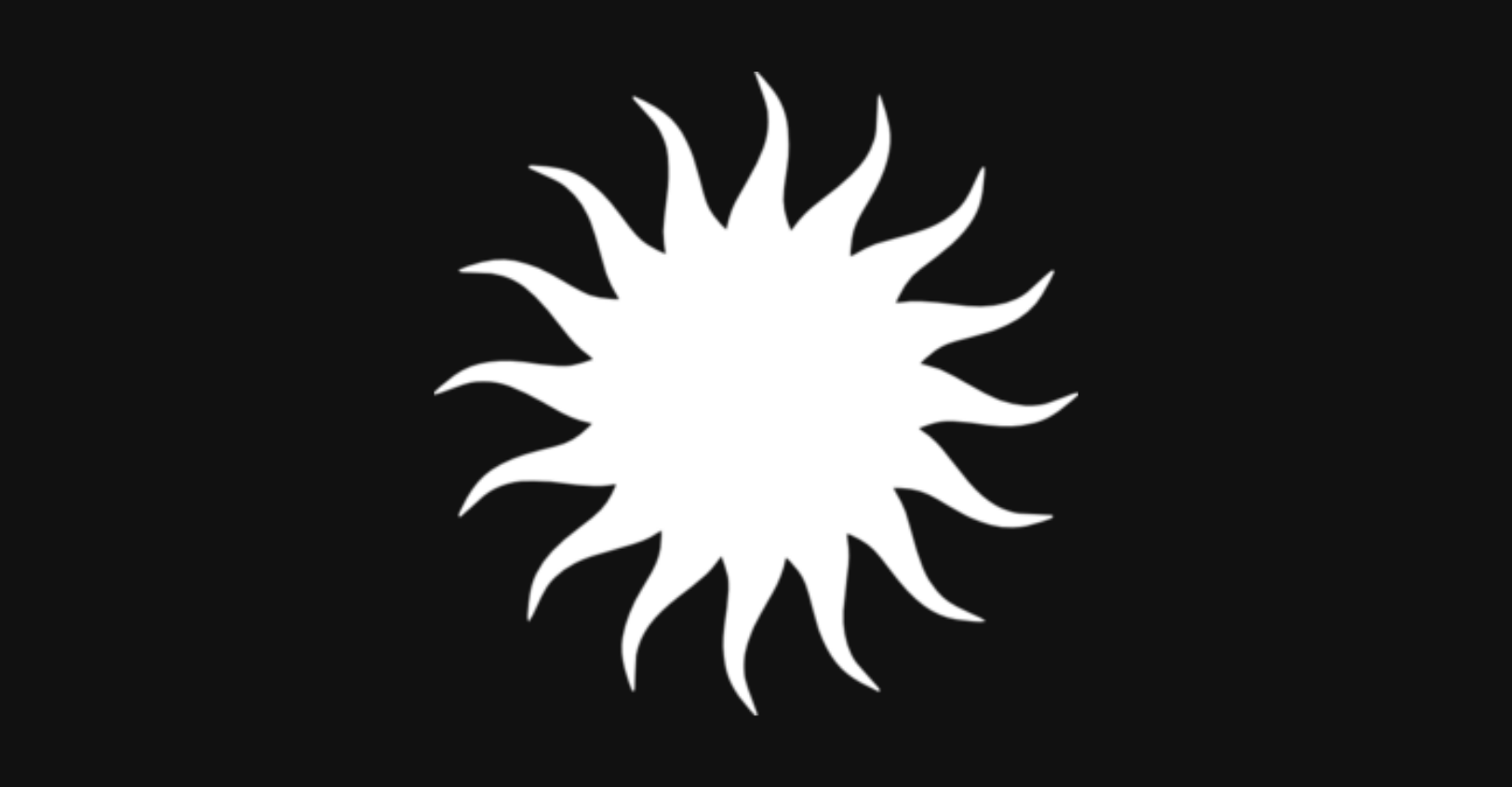
Banner of arms of House Karstark (Sable, a sunburst argent)

Rickard Karstark is the Lord of Karhold and one of the main Stark vassals. During the Battle of the Whispering Wood, Jaime Lannister kills two of his sons, who were guarding Robb Stark. When Catelyn helps Jaime escape in an attempt to recover her daughters, Rickard murders two of Jaime's cousins and has his army desert Robb to search the Riverlands for Jaime, offering his daughter Alys Karstark to whoever brings him the Kingslayer. Due to this, Robb executes Rickard personally.

==== Alys Karstark ====
Alys Karstark is the only daughter and youngest child of Lord Rickard Karstark. She is betrothed to Daryn Hornwood, heir to the Hornwoods, but Jaime Lannister kills him alongside two of her brothers. Her father offers her to whoever captures Jaime Lannister, so the sadistic sellsword Vargo Hoat captures Jaime in the hope of becoming Lord of Karhold. However, after Rickard's death, his uncle, Arnolf Karstark, plots to take control of Karhold. He declares for Stannis when he comes North in the hope that this will mean the Lannisters execute his great-nephew Harrion Karstark, so Karhold will pass to Alys, whom Arnolf intends to force into marriage with his son Cregan Karstark. Arnolf also intends to betray Stannis when the Boltons attack. However, Alys (pursued by Cregan) flees to the Wall seeking Jon Snow's help and reveals her uncle's plans. To protect her, Jon imprisons Cregan and arranges for Alys to marry the Wildling leader Sigorn, Magnar of Thenn, in a ceremony performed by Melisandre, which will aid Wildling integration into the North. If Harrion dies childless, Karhold will pass to the newly formed House Thenn.

==== Wyman Manderly ====
Wyman Manderly is the Lord of White Harbor, the only city in the North, and the wealthiest of the Stark vassals. He is an enormously fat man, with two sons, Ser Wylis and Ser Wendel Manderly. During the War of the Five Kings, the Manderlys and Boltons begin a private war over the Hornwood lands after Ramsay kidnaps the widowed Lady Donella Hornwood, Wyman's cousin, forces her to marry him, and then starves her to death. Wyman's heir Wylis is captured when Roose Bolton treacherously sends a large Northern force to be wiped out by Randyll Tarly. Wyman's younger son Wendel is murdered at the Red Wedding by the Freys. Due to his heir being held captive, Wyman cannot openly defy the Lannisters. Three Freys come to his city with Wendel's bones, and a peace is apparently made, in which Wyman's granddaughters Wynafryd and Wylla will marry one of these Freys, Rhaegar Frey, and another of Walder Frey's grandsons, "Little" Walder Frey. When Davos Seaworth arrives in White Harbor to treat with Wyman to support Stannis, Davos denounces the Freys present for their treachery. Wyman apparently has him executed but secretly executes a criminal in his place, leading Cersei to return his heir. Wyman reveals to Davos he knows where Rickon Stark is hiding and will support Stannis if Davos returns him. Wyman is implied to have murdered the White Harbor Freys when their stay was over (thus keeping to guest right), then put them in pies, which he serves to the Freys and Boltons when he attends Ramsay's wedding, even eating some himself. The Freys suspect him of murdering their kin, and when Little Walder is murdered (possibly by his cousin Big Walder Frey), their uncle Hosteen Frey attacks Wyman and cuts him in the neck. It is unclear if he survives.

==== Hodor ====
Hodor /ˈhoʊdɔːr/ is Old Nan's great-grandson and a slow-witted stable-boy at Winterfell. Although his real name is Walder, he is commonly called "Hodor" because that is the only word he can say. He is over seven feet tall and has been rumored to possibly have giant ancestry. He has a friendly, childlike disposition and possesses great physical strength, though he is too timid and gentle to use it against others. After Bran Stark is crippled in A Game of Thrones, Hodor is tasked with carrying him around in a sling on his back. When Winterfell is sacked and burnt, Hodor escapes north with Bran, Jojen, Meera, Rickon and Osha.

==== Osha ====
Osha (/ˈoʊʃə/) is a wildling woman who sneaks south of the Wall to escape the Others. When she and her fellow refugees try to kidnap Bran Stark in A Game of Thrones, she is captured by Robb Stark and taken back to Winterfell, eventually employed as a scullery maid, and is given limited freedom for her good behavior. She becomes close to Bran Stark and often gives him advice about the oncoming winter. When Theon Greyjoy captures Winterfell, Osha chooses to protect Bran and Rickon over her freedom. She joins Bran and Rickon, hiding in Winterfell's crypt after faking an escape. She later parts ways with Bran and is entrusted to take care of Rickon through the North in their escape, and by A Dance with Dragons, they are reported to have landed on the island of Skagos, supposedly inhabited by cannibals.

==== Jeyne Poole ====
Jeyne Poole is the daughter of Vayon Poole, the steward of Winterfell, and Sansa Stark's best friend. She has brown eyes and dark hair and is described as being very pretty. Following the arrest of Eddard Stark in A Game of Thrones, the members and servants of his household are killed. Jeyne reappears in A Dance with Dragons, having survived the massacre by being sent to Petyr Baelish's brothels. The Lannisters use her as a stand-in for Sansa's younger sister Arya and send her north to marry Ramsay Bolton at Winterfell. Theon Greyjoy recognizes that she is a fake, and that the Boltons are aware of the ruse. It is implied that Ramsay Bolton tortures her and forces her to perform sexual acts on dogs.

Jon Snow, Arya's half-brother, believes Jeyne to be the real Arya and sends Mance Rayder to rescue her. The group enlists Theon's help, but their cover is blown and Theon and Jeyne barely escape.

==== Jojen and Meera Reed ====
Jojen and Meera are the children of Howland Reed, the Lord of Greywater Watch and a loyal Stark bannerman. They first appear in A Clash of Kings, when their father sends them in his place to attend the harvest festival and renew House Reed's pledge to House Stark and support the children of the late Eddard Stark. They become fast friends with Bran Stark and his baby brother, Rickon, and are shown solely from Bran's point of view.

The older sister, Meera, is sixteen years old when introduced in A Clash of Kings. As is typical of crannogmen, Meera is short, slim, and flat-chested, with long brown hair and green eyes, and is described as cheerful. She is intensely loyal and protective of her "prince" as well as of her own brother, with Bran commenting that the only one who ever angers or upsets her is her brother, Jojen. Though she is never described as being particularly beautiful, both Theon Greyjoy and Bran Stark seem to consider her attractive. She is a skilled huntress and fights with a small fishing net and a three-pronged frog spear (similar in style to a retiarius); she is able to defeat Bran's direwolf, Summer, in mock combat by entangling the direwolf in her net. The legacy of Bran's late aunt Lyanna Stark is also largely narrated through her storytelling.

Jojen, the younger brother, is thirteen when he first appears, but his sullen seriousness and maturity make him seem older. He is short and slim with unusually deep green eyes, and he wears green-colored clothing. He claims to have "greensight" and the power of prophetic "green dreams", from which he knows various arcane facts, including the day of his death. In Winterfell, Jojen recognizes Bran Stark as a skinchanger who is able to enter the mind of an animal and control it, and he mentors Bran to help him gain control of his abilities. When Theon Greyjoy captures Winterfell, Jojen and Meera hide with Bran and Rickon in Winterfell's crypt after feigning escape, and they join Bran in his journey north in search of the three-eyed raven after Ramsay Snow sacks and burns Winterfell. At the end of A Storm of Swords, they travel beyond the Wall, and Jojen becomes very weak. In A Dance with Dragons, Meera struggles to keep the group's spirits up but implies that Jojen's future is bleak.

== House Targaryen ==
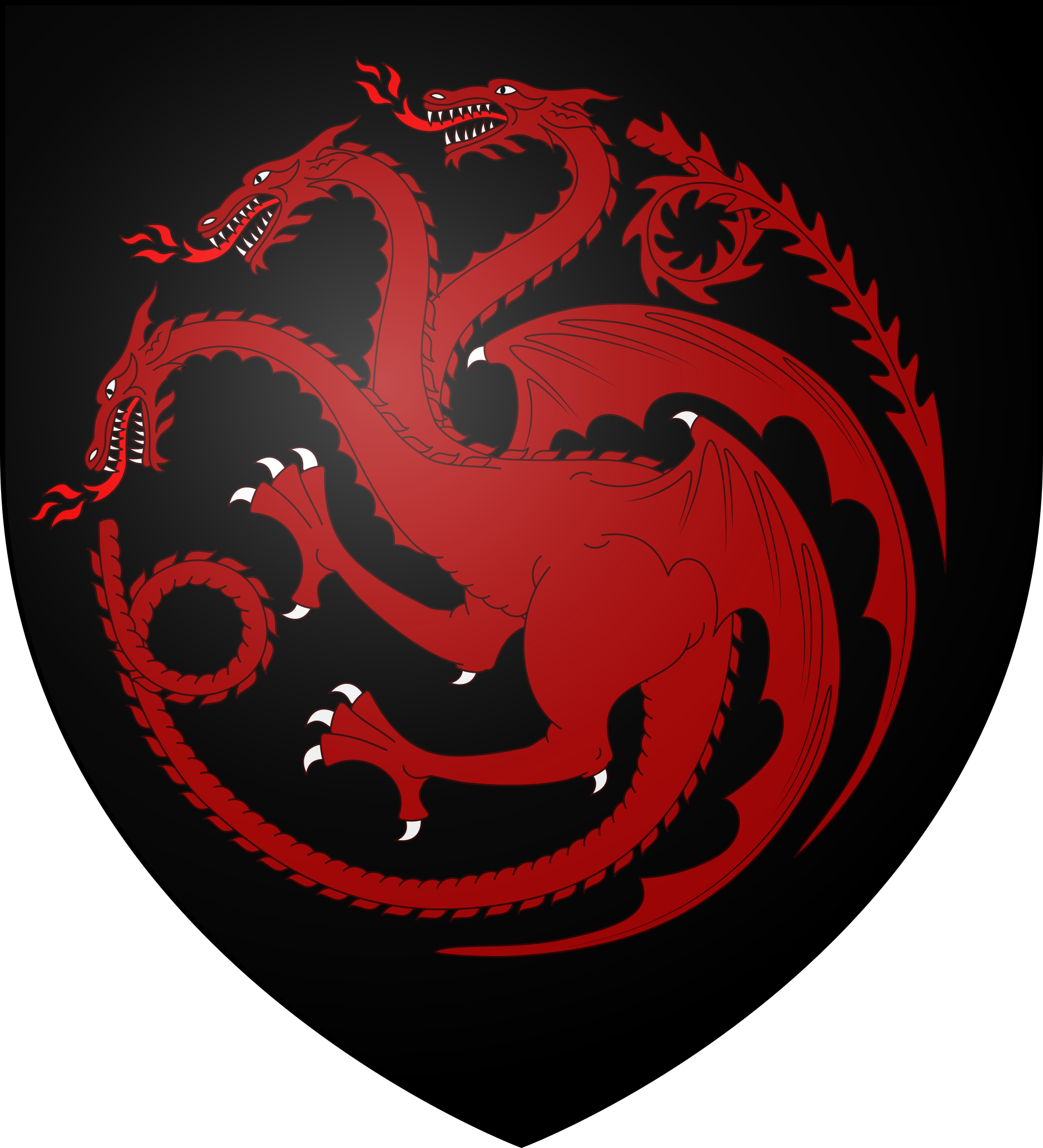
Coat of arms of House Targaryen (Sable, a dragon thrice-headed gules flammant of the last)

In Martin's fictional universe, House Targaryen ruled the Seven Kingdoms for nearly 300 years. Seventeen Targaryen kings (and de facto one queen) held court in King's Landing. Its coat of arms shows a red, three-headed, two-legged dragon breathing fire on a black field, and its words are Fire and Blood. The Targaryen dynasty ended with the death of Aerys II, known as the "Mad King", during Robert's Rebellion, which overthrew the Targaryens and placed House Baratheon on the throne. Aerys II's two surviving children, Viserys and Daenerys, fled into exile in the Free Cities of Essos.

The Targaryens originally came from Valyria on the continent of Essos, one of forty Dragonlord families in the Valyrian Freehold, but not the most powerful. Before Valyria was destroyed, the Targaryens left for Dragonstone, the westernmost outpost of their empire, following a dream by one of their ancestors, Daenys Targaryen, also known as Daenys "the Dreamer". A century after the Valyrian "Doom", Aegon I Targaryen was approached by an alliance of some of the Free Cities against Volantis, Valyria's oldest colony, which sought to rebuild the Freehold under their rule, which Aegon consented to before defeating Volantis with his dragon, Balerion. With the Valyrian Freehold broken, Aegon turned west towards Westeros, intent on uniting the Seven Kingdoms under one ruler, with Dragonstone being the perfect staging point for his conquest, due to having deep waters for his fleet and being within range of the continent. With the aid of his sister-wives, Rhaenys and Visenya, the Targaryens, using their three dragons, successfully conquered six of the Seven Kingdoms by destroying defiant houses and making subjects of submissive ones, with the seventh one peacefully joining the realm through marriage. Aegon built the Iron Throne with his enemies' swords and his dragon's flame, building the Red Keep as his seat and King's Landing as his new capital.

The Targaryen dragons were the last known to exist and died out long before the events of A Game of Thrones. People of Targaryen ancestry, referred to as "blood of the dragon", tend to have silver-blonde hair and amethyst eyes.

Fifteen years before the events of the series, the Targaryens were deposed in Robert's Rebellion, with the last two fleeing to Essos.

Descendants of Maekar Targaryen

Maekar; 221–233 | Dyanna; Dayne
Daenora | Aerion "Brightflame" | Daeron "The Drunken" | Kierra of Tyrosh | Aemon | Aegon V "The Unlikely"; 233–259 | Betha "Black Betha"; Blackwood | Rhae | Daella
Maegor | Vaella "The Simple" | Duncan | Jenny of Oldstones | Jaehaerys II; 259–262 | Shaera | Daeron | Rhaelle | Ormund; Baratheon
Aerys II "The Mad King"; 262–283 | Rhaella | Steffon; Baratheon | Cassana; Estermont
Rhaegar | Elia; Martell | Shaena (stillborn) | Daeron | stillborn child | Aegon | Jaehaerys | Viserys | Drogo | Daenerys | Hizdahr zo Loraq
Rhaenys | Aegon | Rhaego (stillborn)

=== Family ===
==== Aegon V Targaryen ====
Aegon Targaryen, nicknamed "Egg" in his youth, is one of the two main characters in the Tales of Dunk and Egg novellas. He is played by English child actor Dexter Sol Ansell in the 2026 HBO television adaptation A Knight of the Seven Kingdoms.

When Aegon was a child, his father, Prince Maekar, reluctantly allowed him to serve as squire to the lowborn hedge knight Ser Duncan "the Tall", hoping that the lessons learned through humble service and hard experience would help him avoid the mistakes of his royal brothers. He was later crowned King Aegon V when a Great Council bypassed the inheritance of his two oldest brothers, and after his third older brother, Aemon, chose to abdicate by joining the Night's Watch as a maester. He was called "Aegon the Unlikely" because, as the fourth son of a fourth son, he was placed very low in the line of succession and was therefore seen as unlikely to inherit the Iron Throne.

Aegon V's reign lasted more than 25 years, during which he tried to push policies more favorable to the interests of common people, and frequently clashed with noble lords as a result. He later perished in the Tragedy of Summerhall, a huge fire at the Targaryen summer palace, along with his son Prince Duncan and close friend Ser Duncan "the Tall". After he died, his second son, Jaehaerys, inherited the throne as King Jaehaerys II. King Jaehaerys died three years later, and the Iron Throne was passed to his son Aerys, later also known as the "Mad King".

Through Jaehaerys II and Aerys II, Aegon V is the great-grandfather of Rhaegar, Viserys, and Daenerys Targaryen. He is also the great-grandfather of Robert, Stannis, and Renly Baratheon through his daughter Rhaelle, who married into House Baratheon and gave birth to the Baratheon brothers' father, Steffon. This grandmaternal descent from Aegon V later became the basis of Robert Baratheon's legitimacy in claiming the Iron Throne after rebelling against Aerys II.

==== Aerys II Targaryen ====
Aerys II Targaryen, also nicknamed "the Mad King", is the last Targaryen king to rule the Seven Kingdoms. While his rule started well under the supportive counsel of his first cousin Steffon Baratheon and childhood friend Tywin Lannister, he slowly deteriorated into paranoia and madness after the accidental death of Steffon and the bitter falling-out with Tywin, whose wife Joanna was subjected to lewd harassment by Aerys. His much-abused sister-wife Queen Rhaella bore him eight children, but only three survived into adulthood: sons Rhaegar and Viserys and daughter Daenerys, the last of whom was not yet born when the Targaryen dynasty fell.

After Rhaegar absconded with Lyanna Stark for reasons unknown, Lyanna's eldest brother Brandon went to King's Landing seeking to confront Rhaegar but was arrested for royal insult. When Lyanna and Brandon's father, Lord Rickard Stark, was summoned to King's Landing to answer for Brandon's offense, Aerys instead had them and all of their companions summarily executed. When Aerys then ordered the execution of Lyanna's second brother Eddard and her fiancé Robert, both of whom were serving as wards in the Vale under liege lord Jon Arryn, Lord Arryn refused and instead rebelled in alliance with House Baratheon, House Stark and House Tully (whom Brandon was planning to marry into), thus triggering Robert's Rebellion. When the rebels decisively defeated the last of the loyalist main forces at the Battle of the Trident, where the returning Rhaegar was killed by Robert in single combat, Aerys desperately sought help from Tywin, who feigned reinforcement but instead sacked the capital after entering King's Landing. Aerys then ordered his pyromancers to burn down the whole capital with wildfire, intending to make every resident die with him rather than leaving the capital intact for Robert to rule, but he was assassinated by Tywin's son Jaime Lannister, the Kingsguard member who was Aerys' personal bodyguard, earning Jaime the notorious nickname "the Kingslayer".

==== Rhaegar Targaryen ====
Rhaegar Targaryen, nicknamed the "Last Dragon", was the eldest son of King Aerys II and the heir apparent to the Iron Throne, and the older brother to Viserys and Daenerys Targaryen. He died 14 years before the events of A Game of Thrones, and his life's tales are mainly narrated through the words of Jaime Lannister, Cersei Lannister, Barristan Selmy and Daenerys (via visions of sorcery), as well as commentaries by Eddard Stark, Aemon Targaryen, Jorah Mormont, Meera Reed and Jon Connington.

Rhaegar married the Dornish princess Elia Martell, and fathered with her a daughter named Rhaenys and a son named Aegon, the latter of whom he believed to be the prophesied "prince that was promised". After winning the Tourney at Harrenhal, the greatest tourney in Westerosi history, he surprised everyone by passing over his wife Elia and crowning the maiden lady Lyanna Stark as the tourney's "Queen of Love and Beauty". One year later, he and Lyanna both disappeared, prompting rumors that he abducted and raped Lyanna. Enraged, Lyanna's oldest brother, Brandon, goes to King's Landing to confront Rhaegar, which results in both him and his father, Lord Rickard, being brutally executed by King Aerys. Lyanna's other older brother Eddard Stark, her betrothed Robert Baratheon, their foster father Jon Arryn and Brandon's father-in-law-to-be Hoster Tully then started a rebellion against Aerys. After the tide of war started to favor the rebels, Rhaegar reappeared to command the remaining royal army in a massive pitched battle at a ford on the Trident, entrusting the young Jaime Lannister with the safety of the royal family. However, the rebels, being battle-hardened veterans, defeated the loyalists at the Battle of the Trident, with Robert personally killing Rhaegar in single combat. Rhaegar's death effectively spelled the demise of House Targaryen as the ruling dynasty, and King's Landing fell soon afterwards. All the Targaryen royal family, with the exception of Queen Rhaella (who later died in childbirth), Rhaegar's children Prince Aegon and Princess Rhaenys, and Prince Viserys, were killed when the defected House Lannister sacked the capital.

Though Robert continues to vilify Rhaegar's name for years after the rebellion, many others, including Robert's best friend Eddard, still express admiration for him as a noble and honorable prince, despite the unflattering speculations regarding him and Lyanna. Daenerys's stillborn son Rhaego and her dragon Rhaegal are also both named after Rhaegar.

==== Viserys Targaryen ====
Viserys Targaryen is the seventh-born child of Aerys II Targaryen, and the second-born son to survive infancy. Thirteen years before the events of the series, he and his mother Rhaella Targaryen fled Westeros to escape death at the hands of rebel Robert Baratheon. Viserys is an arrogant, cruel, and ambitious man given to violent mood swings. He is widely nicknamed the "Beggar King" across both Essos and Westeros. Hoping to win the Dothraki's favor to conquer Westeros, Viserys arranges for Daenerys to wed Khal Drogo to form an alliance with them. Travelling with the horde until he gets his "golden crown", Viserys grows restless and impatient with Drogo's refusal to march towards the Seven Kingdoms. He also loses influence over Daenerys, who gradually stands up to his abusive behavior. After his scheme to steal her dragon eggs is thwarted by Jorah Mormont, Viserys drunkenly threatens his sister and her unborn child in the Dothraki's sacred city of Vaes Dothrak, demanding that Drogo make good on their deal. Viserys then unwittingly agrees to Drogo's offer of a "golden crown all men will fear", and is killed as the Khal pours molten gold over his head. Daenerys names one of her dragons Viserion in his memory, though only out of respect for keeping her alive for years by protecting her and finding shelter in the Free Cities.

==== Daenerys Targaryen ====
Daenerys Targaryen, referred to sometimes as 'Daenerys Stormborn', 'Khaleesi', the 'Mother of Dragons', is the daughter and youngest child of King Aerys II Targaryen and is one of the last surviving members of House Targaryen. She serves as the point-of-view character in thirty-one chapters throughout A Game of Thrones, A Clash of Kings, A Storm of Swords, and A Dance with Dragons.

==== Aegon Targaryen ====
Prince Aegon Targaryen is the only known son of Rhaegar Targaryen and Elia Martell. Fifteen years before the events of the series, the infant Aegon was reported to have been killed along with his mother and sister by Gregor Clegane.

In A Dance with Dragons, Varys claims to have switched Aegon with another, lowborn infant (known as the "Pisswater prince") and smuggled Aegon out of King's Landing prior to the capital's fall. During his exile in Essos, Tyrion Lannister (under the alias Hugor Hill) meets Young Griff, a well-trained teenage boy endorsed by Varys's associate, Illyrio Mopatis. Young Griff claims to be the surviving Aegon and is under the guardianship of Rhaegar's close friend Jon Connington (a.k.a. Griff). He is to be used by Varys and Illyrio as a puppet king. Young Griff intends to travel to Slaver's Bay to visit his aunt Daenerys Targaryen and propose marriage, but Tyrion provokes him during a cyvasse game and convinces him to abandon the proposal and independently attack Westeros. Declaring himself Aegon, Griff persuades the Golden Company to support his invasion, landing his army in the Stormlands and capturing several castles, while also planning to lay siege to the Baratheon seat of Storm's End.

==== Brynden Rivers ====
Brynden Rivers, better known as "Lord Bloodraven", is a legitimized bastard son of King Aegon IV Targaryen (called Aegon the Unworthy) and Melissa Blackwood. He is one of the only three characters (the others being Aemon Targaryen and Walder Frey) to have appeared in both the A Song of Ice and Fire novels and the Tales of Dunk and Egg novellas. He is an albino, with white skin, long white hair, and red eyes. He has a red birthmark on his left cheek, said to be in the shape of a raven, and thus the source of his nickname "Bloodraven".

Bloodraven remained loyal to his half-brother King Daeron II Targaryen (called Daeron the Good) throughout the Blackfyre Rebellions against another of Aegon's legitimized bastards, Daemon Blackfyre, and their descendants, but was later thrown in prison by his great-nephew King Aegon V Targaryen (called Aegon the Unlikely) for ordering the execution of Aenys Blackfyre despite promising safe passage. He was sent to the Wall as punishment and later elected the Lord Commander of the Night's Watch, and served in that capacity for many years before disappearing during a ranging beyond the Wall. In A Dance with Dragons, Bloodraven is shown to have become the last greenseer and is fused to the root of a weirwood tree. He begins training Bran Stark in clairvoyance.

==== Maekar I Targaryen ====
Maekar is a character in The Tales of Dunk and Egg. He is the fourth and youngest son of Daeron II Targaryen. Maekar married Dyanna Dayne and had six children: four sons, Daeron, Aerion, Aemon, and Aegon, and two daughters, Daella and Rhae. He was made Prince of Summerhall, a summer castle built in the Stormlands by his father. Maekar is resentful that his achievements are often overlooked, especially in favor of his eldest brother Baelor "Breakspear". He was angry when his father Daeron ordered that his third son Aemon be sent to the Citadel. At the Tourney at Ashford, Maekar sends his other three sons and is angered when Dunk attacks the cruel Aerion to defend Tanselle, a Puppeteer. When Aerion asks for a Trial by Seven, Maekar takes his son's side; however, Baelor takes Dunk's side. In the fight, Dunk forces Aerion to withdraw his accusation, but Maekar, while trying to reach his son, is stopped by Baelor and accidentally strikes him a blow to the head that kills him. He allows Dunk to take Aegon as his squire when Dunk points out how Daeron and Aerion turned out. Maekar would eventually become King but died 12 years later at the Peake Uprising, when a stone thrown from the Peake's castle, Starpike, crushed his head.

==== House Blackfyre ====
House Blackfyre is a semi-extinct cadet house of House Targaryen. Their sigil is a three-headed black dragon on a red field, the reverse of House Targaryen. House Blackfyre was founded when Aegon IV "the Unworthy" (reigned AL 172–184) legitimized all his bastard children on his deathbed. Aegon gave "Blackfyre", the sword of the first Targaryen king, to his bastard Daemon, seeming to signify his favour for Daemon over the heir apparent: his true-born son Daeron. When Aegon IV died, Daemon I Blackfyre contested Daeron II Targaryen's right to the Iron Throne. This challenge set off conflicts between AL 184–260, where a series of Blackfyre pretenders vied for the Iron Throne.

=== Servants and vassals ===
==== Jon Connington ====
Lord Jon Connington is the exiled Lord of Griffin's Roost and was a close friend of Rhaegar Targaryen. Jon serves as a third-person narrator for two chapters in A Dance with Dragons. Fifteen years before the events of the series, King Aerys II made Jon his Hand of the King. However, Jon also failed to contain the rebellion. Aerys stripped him of his lands and titles, giving them to Jon's cousin Ronald Connington, and exiled him. Biding his time in Essos, he raises Young Griff, supposedly Rhaegar's son Aegon. Jon and Aegon eventually decide to attack Westeros while it is embroiled in civil war. During the return trip, Connington contracts Greyscale Plague when saving Tyrion. The group lands in the Stormlands and captures several castles, including Griffin's Roost. Aegon plans to lead the attack on Storm's End, the next target.

==== Jorah Mormont ====
Coat of arms of House Mormont (Wood vert, a bear sable rampant)

Ser Jorah Mormont is the exiled Lord of Bear Island in the North, which he inherited after his father Jeor Mormont joined the Night's Watch. His wife's lavish lifestyle led to debts, which led Jorah to engage in selling slaves. Escaping justice, he fled to Essos and eventually joined the service of Daenerys Targaryen, becoming one of her chief advisors.

==== Missandei ====
Missandei is a slave interpreter for Kraznys mo Nakloz when Daenerys Targaryen comes to inspect the Unsullied in Astapor. After Daenerys strikes a bargain with the Good Masters of Astapor concerning payment for the Unsullied, Kraznys gives Missandei to Daenerys as an interpreter to give them commands. Afterwards, she becomes a trusted confidante and handmaiden to Daenerys.

==== Daario Naharis ====
Daario Naharis is a leader in the Stormcrows mercenary company. Daenerys wins over Daario and brings the Stormcrows over to her side. He becomes romantically involved with her and eventually becomes one of her advisors.

==== Grey Worm ====
Grey Worm ("Torgo Nudho" in High Valyrian) is an Unsullied purchased by and sworn to Daenerys Targaryen. He is the commander of Daenerys's Unsullied and one of her trusted advisors. After Daenerys flees Meereen, Grey Worm becomes a member of the ruling council of the city.

== House Lannister ==
Coat of arms of House Lannister (Gules, a lion rampant or)

House Lannister is the main antagonistic faction and one of the Major Houses of the Seven Kingdoms and the principal house of the Westerlands. Its seat is at Casterly Rock, and they are also given the title Wardens of the West. Its coat of arms displays a golden lion rampant on a crimson field, and its words are "Hear Me Roar!"

The Lannisters began as a First Men dynasty descended from the legendary trickster Lann the Clever, who swindled House Casterly out of their traditional seat at Casterly Rock, ruling the Westerlands as Kings of the Rock ever since. They also branched into the nearby city of Lannisport and gained the Reynes of Castamere as a vassal after defeating the Hooded King. The Lannisters would become an Andal bloodline, under a First Man name after the Andal invasion, where they made alliances through marriages and wards. Like many Houses, the Lannisters kept a Valyrian steel blade as an ancestral heirloom, naming it Brightroar, which was lost after King Tommen II Lannister left for Valyria with it and never returned. The Lannisters would stand with House Gardener against House Targaryen's conquest of Westeros, only to subject their combined armies to annihilation in the Field of Fire, after which King Loren Lannister surrendered, and the Lannisters became the Wardens of the West.

Descendants of Tytos Lannister

Tytos | Jeyne; Marbrand
Joanna | Tywin | Emmon; Frey | Genna | Kevan | Dorna; Swyft | Tygett | Darlessa; Marbrand | Gerion | Briony
Robert; Baratheon | Cersei | Jaime | Tysha (Note: Tyrion's first wife was a peasant girl named Tysha. The marriage was later annulled by Lord Tywin's order.) | Tyrion | Sansa; Stark | Amerei; Frey | Lancel | Martyn | Willem | Janei | Tyrek | Ermesande; Hayford | Joy; Hill
Joffrey; Baratheon (Note: Though officially Robert's children, Joffrey, Myrcella and Tommen are the products of an incestuous affair between Cersei and Jaime.) | Myrcella; Baratheon | Margaery; Tyrell | Tommen; Baratheon | Tion; Frey | "Red" Walder; Frey | Jeyne; Darry | Cleos; Frey | Lyonel; Frey | Melesa Crakehall
Tywin; Frey | Willem; Frey

References and notes:

=== Family ===
==== Tywin Lannister ====
Tywin Lannister is Lord of Casterly Rock, Shield of Lannisport, and Warden of the West. He is a calculating, ruthless, and controlling man. In his youth, he witnessed his father grow old and weak. Eventually, several nobles revolted against Lannister rule. Disgusted with his father's inaction, Tywin personally led the Lannister army and utterly destroyed the rebellious vassals, placing the bodies of their entire families on display at Casterly Rock. Impressed with his decisive actions in putting down the rebellion, Aerys II Targaryen appointed the young Tywin Hand of the King. Tywin proved himself a ruthless but capable leader, and his tenure was marked by peace and prosperity.

==== Cersei Lannister ====
Cersei Lannister is the twin sister of Jaime (the elder of the two) and the only daughter of Tywin Lannister. She serves as the third-person narrator of twelve chapters in A Feast for Crows and A Dance with Dragons. She became queen by marrying Robert Baratheon. She has three children (all of whom are in actuality fathered by her twin brother).

==== Jaime Lannister ====
Jaime Lannister is the twin brother of Cersei and the first son of Tywin Lannister. He serves as the third-person narrator of seventeen chapters throughout A Storm of Swords, A Feast for Crows, and A Dance with Dragons. He was widely considered one of the best sworders in all the Seven Kingdoms before having his right hand chopped off by Vargo Hoat.

==== Tyrion Lannister ====
Tyrion Lannister is the younger brother of Cersei and Jaime Lannister, and serves as a third-person narrator for 47 chapters in A Game of Thrones, A Clash of Kings, A Storm of Swords and A Dance with Dragons. He is the narrator with the most chapters in the books.

==== Joffrey Baratheon ====
Joffrey Baratheon's personal coat of arms (per pale, or and gules, a stag and lion combatant, sable and or respectively)

Joffrey Baratheon is the eldest of Queen Cersei Lannister's children. Though a Baratheon in name, Joffrey is actually a product of incest between Cersei and Jaime Lannister, but is unaware of his true parentage. He is described as a strong-willed child with a vicious temper and a sadistic streak.

==== Myrcella Baratheon ====
Princess Myrcella Baratheon is the second-oldest child and only daughter of Queen Cersei Lannister. Like her brothers, she was fathered by Cersei's twin brother Jaime Lannister, but she is ostensibly unaware of this. She is described as delicate, beautiful, and courteous, and is said to have all her mother's beauty but none of her cruel nature. To ensure that House Martell will support Joffrey, Myrcella is betrothed to marry Prince Trystane Martell when they come of age and is sent to Dorne in A Clash of Kings. After Joffrey died in A Storm of Swords, Princess Arianne Martell schemes to kidnap Myrcella and crown her queen of Westeros. The plan goes awry, however, and Myrcella is severely injured in the kidnapping.

==== Tommen Baratheon ====
Prince Tommen Baratheon is the younger brother of Prince Joffrey and Princess Myrcella and is second in line for the throne. Tommen is Queen Cersei Lannister's youngest child and, like his siblings, he is also the son of Cersei's twin brother Jaime Lannister, but he is unaware of this, as he believes Robert Baratheon to be his father. Like his sister, he shares none of his mother's ruthlessness and is, in fact, mild-mannered, courteous, and kind-hearted.

==== Kevan Lannister ====
Ser Kevan Lannister is Tywin Lannister's younger brother and most trusted captain, known for his reliability and loyalty. He serves as the third-person narrator for the epilogue of A Dance with Dragons. He is comfortable carrying out Tywin's wishes and has resigned himself to living in his brother's shadow forever. In A Storm of Swords, he is appointed Master of War to his great-nephew King Joffrey Baratheon, and after Tywin's death, he is offered the position of Hand of the King in A Feast for Crows but refuses to serve Cersei, so he leaves for Casterly Rock. After Cersei's imprisonment, the council appoints him Lord Regent to King Tommen Baratheon, and he tries to solve the problems Cersei created. Because his efforts to stabilize the kingdom threaten Aegon Targaryen's plans to take the throne, Varys kills Kevan.

==== Lancel Lannister ====
Lancel Lannister is the eldest son of Kevan Lannister and serves as squire to King Robert Baratheon at King's Landing in A Game of Thrones. He helps Queen Cersei kill Robert. In A Clash of Kings, Cersei knights him for his part in Robert's death. After Cersei takes Lancel as a lover, Tyrion discovers the affair and blackmails Lancel into spying for him. During an attack on King's Landing, Lancel guards Cersei's son King Joffrey Baratheon and is seriously wounded in the fighting. During his recovery in A Storm of Swords, he experiences a spiritual awakening and spends much of his time atoning for his sins. When the Faith Militant, the military order of the Faith, is reinstated, Lancel renounces his wife and lands, and joins the organization.

=== Servants and vassals ===
==== Bronn ====
Bronn is a skilled sellsword of low birth. He is described as having a sardonic sense of humor and a pragmatic, amoral philosophy. He helps Catelyn take Tyrion to the Eyrie, where he befriends Tyrion. Recognizing he will gain more helping House Lannister, Bronn offers to champion for Tyrion in a trial by combat, wins the duel, and then serves as his bodyguard in King's Landing. After fighting in the Battle of Blackwater, he is knighted and takes a burning green chain as his sigil, though he continues to serve Tyrion. During Tyrion's trial for murdering Joffrey, Bronn refuses to champion for him again, instead taking an offer from Cersei to be married to the pregnant Lollys Stokeworth. When his wife gives birth, he names his stepson Tyrion in dubious honor of his former employer. Shortly afterward, Bronn becomes the head of House Stokeworth after all members, except Lollys, die under mysterious circumstances. Cersei also worries that he is still in league with Tyrion.

==== Gregor Clegane ====
Coat of arms of House Clegane (Or, three dogs courant sable)

Ser Gregor Clegane, known as "the Mountain That Rides," or simply "the Mountain," is the older brother of Sandor Clegane and is a vassal to Tywin Lannister. His size and strength make him a fearsome warrior, and he has earned a reputation for brutality.

==== Sandor Clegane ====
Sandor Clegane, known as "the Hound," is a retainer to House Lannister and the younger brother of Gregor Clegane. He is regarded as one of the most dangerous and skilled fighters in Westeros. His face is distinguished by gruesome burn scars, which he received as a child when his brother pushed his head into a brazier.

==== Podrick Payne ====
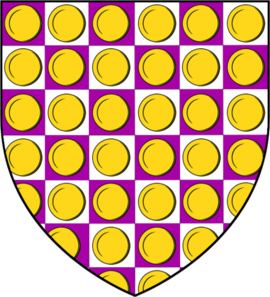
Coat of arms of House Payne (Chequy purpure and argent, each chequer charged with a bezant)

Podrick Payne, Pod for short, is a squire to Tyrion Lannister toward the end of A Game of Thrones. Despite being painfully shy and insecure, he proves himself to be a loyal and capable squire. In A Clash of Kings, he rescues Tyrion from an assassination attempt. He continues his duties through A Storm of Swords until Tyrion vanishes in A Feast for Crows. He follows Brienne of Tarth, knowing that she was searching for Tyrion's wife Sansa Stark. He becomes Brienne's squire and serves her as faithfully as he did Tyrion. He and Brienne are captured by the Brotherhood Without Banners, and Podrick is sentenced to be hanged for serving as Tyrion's squire. His fate is currently unknown.

==== Shae ====
Shae is a Lannister camp follower who sleeps with Tyrion Lannister before the battle on the Green Fork. She accompanies him to King's Landing, against Tywin's orders, and serves as his mistress. To prevent discovery, Shae is set up as a handmaiden by Tyrion and Varys, serving Lollys Stokeworth and later Sansa Stark. During the trial accusing Tyrion of murdering Joffrey, Shae gives testimony against him, flaunting their relationship to the court, in exchange for being wed to a knight. She is later found in Tywin's bed by Tyrion and strangled to death with the Hand's Chain.

== House Baratheon ==
Coat of arms of House Baratheon (Or, a stag rampant)

In the book series, House Baratheon is the youngest of the great houses of the Seven Kingdoms and the principal house of The Stormlands. It was founded by Orys, the supposed bastard half-brother of the first Targaryen king. Under Robert, House Baratheon usurped the Iron Throne in King's Landing, with his younger brothers Stannis and Renly ruling Dragonstone and the ancestral seat Storm's End, respectively. The Baratheon coat of arms displays a black stag on a field of gold; a crown was added after Robert Baratheon took the Iron Throne. The house motto is Ours is the Fury. Acknowledged bastards born in the Stormlands are generally given the surname "Storm".

Family tree of House Baratheon

Ormund | Rhaelle; Targaryen
Steffon | Cassana; Estermont
Delena; Florent | Robert; 283–298 | Cersei; Lannister | Jaime; Lannister | Stannis | Selyse; Florent | Renly | Margaery; Tyrell (Note: Margaery Tyrell first married Renly, then Joffrey, and then Tommen.)
Edric; Storm | Gendry | Bella | Myrcella (Note: Joffrey, Myrcella and Tommen, although recognized by Robert, are secretly the illegitimate children of Jaime Lannister.) | Shireen
Mya; Stone | Barra | 11 others | Joffrey; 298–300 | Margaery; Tyrell | Tommen; 300–

=== Family ===
==== Robert Baratheon ====
Robert "the Usurper" Baratheon is King of the Seven Kingdoms at the beginning of A Game of Thrones. He was the ward of Jon Arryn and was raised at the Eyrie alongside Eddard Stark. Fifteen years before the novels, Robert was betrothed to Ned's sister, Lyanna; after Lyanna and Rhaegar Targaryen disappeared, Robert killed Rhaegar and seized the throne.

==== Stannis Baratheon ====
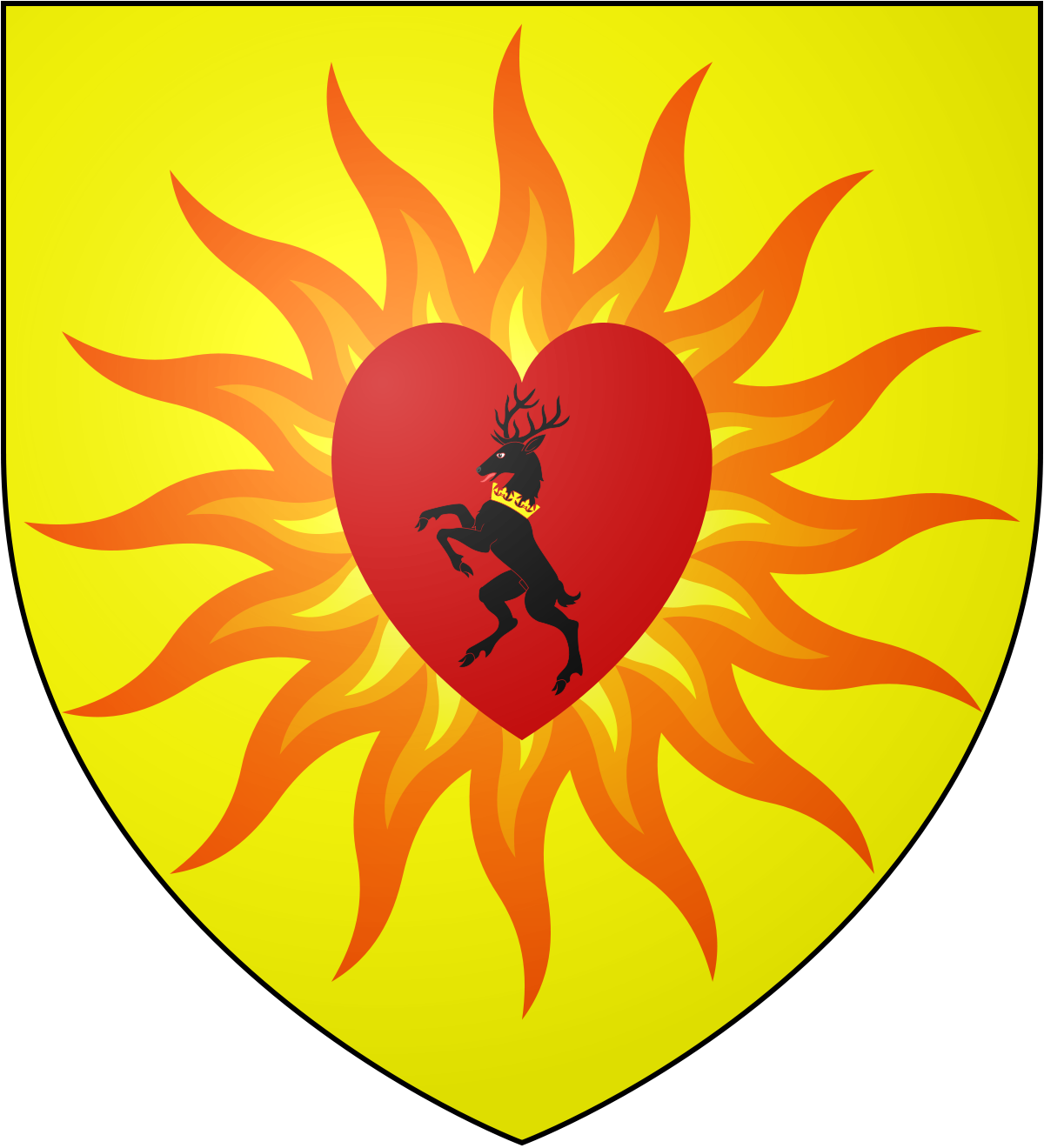
Personal coat of arms of Stannis Baratheon

Stannis Baratheon is the younger brother of King Robert and the older brother of Renly. He is portrayed as a brooding and humorless man with a harsh sense of justice and an obsession with slights both real and imagined. He is regarded as a skilled but overcautious military commander.

==== Renly Baratheon ====
Renly Baratheon is the youngest of the Baratheon brothers and lord of Storm's End. He is described as handsome and charismatic, and he wins friends easily. Renly serves on Robert's council as his master of laws.

==== Selyse Baratheon ====
Selyse Baratheon (née Florent) is married to Stannis and the mother of Shireen. She is described as being fairly unattractive, with extremely prominent ears and a hint of a mustache on her upper lip. Selyse has a cold relationship with her husband. She is the first of her family to be converted to the religion of the Red God, R'hllor, by Melisandre.

==== Shireen Baratheon ====
Shireen Baratheon is the only living child and the heir presumptive of Stannis Baratheon and his wife, Selyse Florent. She contracted the lethal greyscale disease as a child, disfiguring her by leaving the left side of her cheek and most of her neck covered by grey, cracked, stone-like skin.

==== Gendry ====
Gendry is one of Robert Baratheon's many bastard children. He lives in King's Landing as an armorer's apprentice and is unaware of his true parentage. Gendry later joins the Brotherhood without Banners.

==== Edric Storm ====
Edric Storm is Robert Baratheon's only acknowledged bastard. He was conceived on Stannis and Selyse's wedding night, when Robert seduced and deflowered Delena Florent, one of Selyse's cousins, in Stannis's marriage bed. Edric was sent by Stannis to be fostered by his other uncle, Renly Baratheon. Edric was raised under the guardianship of Storm's End Castellan Ser Cortnay Penrose. After Renly dies, Cortnay refuses to surrender Storm's End, fearing Stannis's intentions for Edric; as a result, he is assassinated by Melisandre. Stannis then sends Edric to Dragonstone. Melisandre and Selyse tell Stannis to sacrifice Edric, claiming his king's blood will enable them to raise a dragon. To prevent this, Davos sends Edric to Lys under the guardianship of one of Robert's cousins, Andrew Estermont.

=== Servants and vassals ===
==== Melisandre ====
Melisandre of Asshai is a priestess of R'hllor in service to Stannis Baratheon. She is introduced in A Clash of Kings and serves as the third-person narrator for one chapter of A Dance with Dragons. She is described as a beautiful woman with red eyes, who always dresses in red and rarely sleeps or eats.

==== Davos Seaworth ====
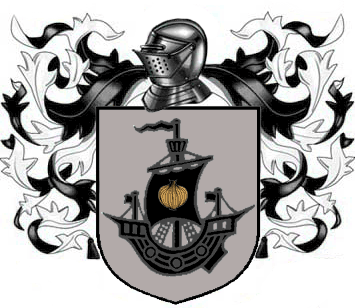
Coat of arms of Davos Seaworth

Ser Davos Seaworth, called the Onion Knight after smuggling onions and salted fish into Storm's End during Robert's Rebellion, is the common-born head of the newly founded House Seaworth and was formerly known as an elusive smuggler. He is introduced in A Clash of Kings and is the third-person narrator for thirteen chapters throughout A Clash of Kings, A Storm of Swords, and A Dance with Dragons. During the Siege of Storm's End, Davos smuggled food to the starving Stannis Baratheon, earning him a knighthood and choice lands. Before knighting him, Stannis removed the last joints from four fingers on Davos's left hand as punishment for years of smuggling.

In A Clash of Kings, he supports Stannis's claim to the throne, making him Stannis's most trusted adviser, but Davos is a follower of the Faith of the Seven and opposes Melisandre. During the Battle of the Blackwater, his ship is destroyed, but Davos survives, losing four sons. He blames Melisandre for the deaths of his sons and plans to kill her, but she receives word of the plot, and he is jailed. Stannis eventually pardons Davos and names him his Hand of the King. As Hand, Davos convinces Stannis to help the Watch against the wildling army.

After Stannis sails to the Wall, he tasks Davos with enlisting the support of House Manderly, but Davos is taken prisoner. After staging Davos's death, Manderly asks Davos to rescue Rickon Stark from Skagos in exchange for House Manderly's support for Stannis. His fate is unknown.

==== Brienne of Tarth ====
Brienne, the Maid of Tarth, serves as a POV narrator for eight chapters in the fourth book of the series, A Feast for Crows. Tall, imposing, and extremely plain, she is mocked by many as "Brienne the Beauty". She is a maiden on a quest.

==== Beric Dondarrion ====
Beric Dondarrion is a gallant knight with great fighting skill. In A Game of Thrones, Eddard Stark sends him to arrest Gregor Clegane and bring peace to the Riverlands. He is ambushed and killed by Lannister forces. Thoros of Myr accidentally revives him with magic during the funeral service. By A Storm of Swords, he and his men have formed an outlaw band called the Brotherhood Without Banners. The Brotherhood starts a guerrilla war against raiders in the Riverlands. The success of these ambushes earns him the nickname the Lightning Lord, also a reference to his coat of arms. He is killed several other times, only to be brought back to life. Each resurrection causes him to lose some memories from his previous life. In the third book, he and his men find the corpse of Catelyn Stark. He resurrects her with the last of his life force and dies for the final time.

== House Arryn ==
Coat of arms of House Arryn

House Arryn is described as one of the Great Houses of the Seven Kingdoms and is the principal house in the Vale. It is descended from the Kings of the Mountain and the Vale. Its main seat is at the Eyrie, a small castle atop a mountain and reputed to be impregnable, where they are the Wardens of the East. Its coat of arms displays a white moon-and-falcon on a sky-blue field, and its words are As High as Honor. Bastards born in the Vale are generally given the surname "Stone".

Jon Arryn was the head of the Arryn family until he was poisoned shortly before A Game of Thrones. His only child, Robert "Sweetrobin" Arryn, became Lord of the Vale with Lysa Tully acting as regent.

Family tree of House Arryn

Jasper
Jeyne; Royce (Note: Jon Arryn also had a stillborn daughter by his first wife, Jeyne Royce.)
Jon | Lysa; Tully | Ronnel | Lady; Belmore | Alys | Elys; Waynwood
Rowena; Arryn
two stillborn children | Robert | Elbert | daughter | Denys; Arryn | daughter | member of House Hardyng | daughter | Lord; Elesham | five other daughters | Jasper; Waynwood
son | Cissy | Harrold; Hardyng | Saffron
Alys; Stone | bastard child

=== Family ===
==== Jon Arryn ====
Jon Arryn was the Lord of the Eyrie, Defender of the Vale, Warden of the East, and Hand to King Robert Baratheon before the events of A Game of Thrones. He took Robert and Eddard Stark as wards and became a father figure to both. When King Aerys II Targaryen commanded him to hand over his wards for execution, Jon rose in rebellion. To earn the support of House Tully in the rebellion, Jon married the much younger Lysa Tully. Throughout Robert's reign, Jon was left with most of the responsibility of the Seven Kingdoms. When Stannis Baratheon had doubts about the parentage of Queen Cersei Lannister's children, he brought his suspicions to Jon, who confirmed that Robert did not father Cersei's children, who were actually fathered by her brother Jaime. Before he could reveal this publicly, Lysa poisoned him on Littlefinger's orders to stop him from sending their son, Robert, away as a ward. Jon Arryn's death immediately precedes and directly prompts the story that begins in A Game of Thrones.

==== Lysa Arryn ====
Lysa Arryn, formerly of House Tully, is the second child and youngest daughter of Lord Hoster Tully. Enamored of Petyr Baelish, Lysa resented her older sister Catelyn Tully when he fell in love with her. Prior to the series, while Baelish was her father's ward, Lysa was impregnated by him after Catelyn spurned him. Learning of this, Hoster sent Baelish home and tricked Lysa into drinking an abortifacient potion, using her unborn child as proof of her fertility while marrying her off to Jon Arryn. Lysa has become a paranoid, unstable, mercurial woman.

Shortly before A Game of Thrones, Baelish convinced Lysa to poison her husband and write a letter to Catelyn to name House Lannister responsible for the act. Lysa, fearing that her husband was sending her child to be fostered in a far-off land, agrees. Fearing for herself and her son's safety, Lysa returns to the Eyrie and becomes Lady Regent of the Vale of Arryn. At the Eyrie, Lysa becomes involved in Catelyn's kidnapping of Tyrion Lannister, then refuses House Stark's plea for assistance and commits the Vale to a strict policy of neutrality in the war. Lysa later accepts a marriage proposal from Baelish in A Storm of Swords. After finding Baelish kissing Sansa Stark, Lysa attempts to throw her to her death, but Baelish saves Sansa by murdering Lysa.

==== Robert Arryn ====
Robert Arryn, sometimes called "Sweetrobin", is the only child of Jon Arryn and Lysa Tully. He suffers from frequent seizure-like episodes, a symptom of what his mother terms the "shaking illness", and is depicted as intellectually and physically stunted. At the start of the series, he is Lord of the Eyrie and Defender of the Vale, though his mother rules as regent. After Lysa's marriage to Petyr Baelish and her subsequent death in A Storm of Swords, Baelish claims the rule of the Vale and guardianship of Robert. In the absence of his mother, he becomes attached to his cousin, Sansa Stark, in her disguise as Alayne Stone. In the Game of Thrones television show, Robert Arryn's name is changed to Robin Arryn.

=== Vassals ===
==== Yohn Royce ====
Yohn Royce (sometimes called "Bronze Yohn") is Lord of Runestone and head of House Royce. After the death of Lysa Arryn, Lord Yohn forms the Lords Declarant in opposition to Petyr Baelish's rule of the Vale.

==== Anya Waynwood ====
Lady Waynwood is the lady of Ironoaks and the head of House Waynwood, a powerful vassal to House Arryn of the Vale. Lady Anya is part of the Lords Declarant, who oppose Baelish's rule of the Vale.

==== Nestor Royce ====
Nestor is a cousin of Yohn Royce via a lesser branch of House Royce. He ruled the Eyrie as High Steward of the Vale during Jon Arryn's absence, acted as Keeper of the Gates of the Moon, and feels he is owed for his years of service. Littlefinger later makes him the hereditary Lord of the Gates of the Moon to keep him loyal, signing the paper declaring this so that Nestor, holding the Gates, depends on Baelish's power.

== House Greyjoy ==
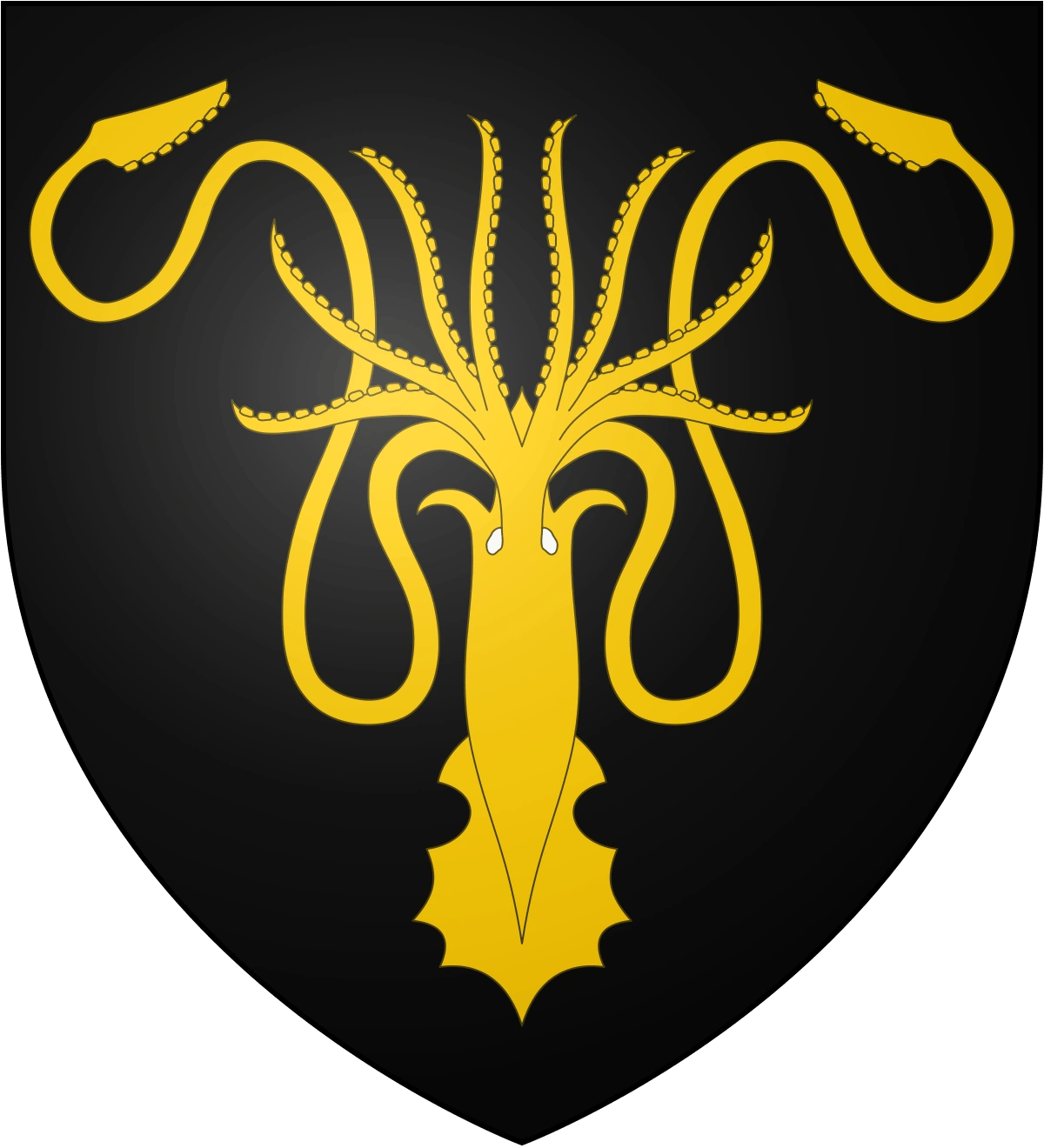
Coat of arms of House Greyjoy

House Greyjoy is one of the Great Houses of the Seven Kingdoms in Martin's fictional universe and is the principal noble house on the Iron Islands, home to the Ironborn. Its seat is on Pyke. Its coat of arms displays a golden kraken on a black field, and its words are We Do Not Sow. Bastards born in the Iron Islands are given the surname "Pyke". The Greyjoys became Lords Paramount of the Iron Islands after House Targaryen conquered the Seven Kingdoms and allowed the Ironborn to choose who would have primacy over them. Balon Greyjoy is the current Lord of the Iron Islands. He has two surviving children: his only daughter, Asha, and Theon.

Family tree of House Greyjoy

Lady; Stonetree | Quellon | Lady; Piper
Lady; Sunderly
Harlon | Quenton | Donel | Balon IX | Alannys Harlaw | Euron III "Crow's Eye" | Victarion | Urrigon | Aeron "Damphair" | Robin
Rodrik | Maron | Asha Greyjoy (Note: For the TV series, Asha was renamed Yara) | Erik; Ironmaker | Theon | several bastard children

=== Family ===
==== Balon Greyjoy ====
Balon Greyjoy is the Lord of the Iron Islands, King of Salt and Rock, Son of the Sea Wind, and Lord Reaper of Pyke. He is a harsh and fierce man. Ten years before A Song of Ice and Fire, he led a rebellion against King Robert Baratheon. The rebellion failed, and his youngest son, Theon Greyjoy, was taken as a hostage and raised in Winterfell by Lord Eddard Stark. After Robert's death, Balon spurns Robb Stark's offer of an alliance in A Clash of Kings and declares himself King of the Iron Islands and the North. He captures the Neck and ravages the coastline of the Stark-held North. He dies in A Storm of Swords after falling off a bridge during a storm. The timely return of Balon's banished brother Euron leads many characters to believe that Euron played a part in Balon's death.

==== Asha Greyjoy ====
Asha Greyjoy is Balon Greyjoy's only daughter and oldest living child. She serves as the third-person narrator for four chapters throughout A Feast for Crows and A Dance with Dragons. Asha was raised as Balon's heir despite a custom forbidding female leadership, and has challenged traditional gender roles by captaining her own ship and leading men into battle. When Balon orders an invasion of the North in A Clash of Kings, she captures Deepwood Motte. She returns to the Islands in A Feast for Crows after her father's death and claims her father's throne, which she loses in favor of her uncle Euron. In A Dance with Dragons, she returns to Deepwood Motte and learns that Euron has married her off by proxy. She is eventually captured by Stannis Baratheon and travels with his army toward Winterfell, where she is reunited with her brother Theon.

==== Theon Greyjoy ====
Theon Greyjoy is the only living son and heir apparent of Balon Greyjoy. He is the third-person narrator for thirteen chapters throughout A Clash of Kings and A Dance with Dragons. He is arrogant and proud. Ten years before the events of the series, he was taken hostage by Ned Stark to be executed if Balon displeased the king. Theon was raised at Winterfell with the Stark children and became a close friend to Robb Stark in particular.

==== Euron Greyjoy ====
Euron Greyjoy is Balon's younger brother and is hated by all his brothers. He wears a patch over his left eye, for which he is nicknamed "Crow's Eye", and is more ruthless and sadistic than his brothers. Before the events of the series, he was banished from the Iron Islands. During his exile, he lived as a pirate, became extremely wealthy, and was drawn into dark magic, culminating in his gaining possession of a horn that can control dragons. In A Feast for Crows, Euron's return from exile coincides with Balon's death, encouraging speculation that he played a role in his brother's demise. After becoming King of the Iron Islands at a Kingsmoot by telling the Ironborn he knows where there are dragons and that he intends to conquer Westeros, he begins successful raids along the Reach. He sends his brother Victarion Greyjoy away to court Daenerys Targaryen in his name and bring her and her dragons to Westeros.

==== Victarion Greyjoy ====
Victarion Greyjoy is the second youngest of Balon's surviving brothers and is Lord Commander of the Iron Fleet. He first appears in A Clash of Kings when his brother, King Balon Greyjoy, reveals his plans to invade the North; Victarion is given overall command of the invasion. He appears next in A Feast for Crows and serves as the third-person narrator for four chapters throughout that book and A Dance with Dragons. Victarion is a devout follower of the Drowned God. Years before the events of the series, he killed his wife after he learned of her affair with Euron and has not remarried. After failing to become King of the Iron Islands, he is sent away to court Daenerys Targaryen in Euron's name; he plans to marry her himself to spite Euron for earlier betrayals. After weathering a savage storm, the remains of his fleet reach Meereen. Victarion orders his fleet to assault the forces besieging the city. His fate is to be determined.

==== Aeron Greyjoy ====
Aeron Greyjoy is the youngest of Balon's surviving brothers. He is introduced in A Clash of Kings and serves as a third-person narrator for two chapters of A Feast for Crows. In his youth, he was a drunk and was scorned by Balon, which gave him the later name "Aeron Damphair". After nearly drowning, he dedicated himself to the Drowned God and became a high priest. After Balon's mysterious death and the crowning of his brother Euron, he becomes a bitter opponent of Euron and his schemes, calling a Kingsmoot to make Victarion King instead of Euron. This fails, and Aeron goes into hiding. A preview chapter from The Winds of Winter reveals that Euron had his men capture Aeron, leaving him imprisoned in Euron's ship for several months before being tied to the ship's prow. It is also revealed that Euron had repeatedly molested Aeron in their youth, leading to Aeron's hatred of Euron.

=== Servants and vassals ===
==== Rodrik Harlaw ====
Rodrik Harlaw is the Lord of Harlaw, the most populated of the Iron Islands. He is the richest man in the Iron Islands and the maternal uncle of Asha Greyjoy, one of his sisters being Balon's wife. Rodrik is known as "The Reader" because of his love of reading. He has so many books that they have filled one of the Towers in his castle of Ten Towers. As both of Rodrik's sons died in the First Greyjoy Rebellion, his various relatives are vying to become his heir. Rodrik has nominated his cousin Ser Harras Harlaw as heir to Harlaw. After Balon's death, Rodrik agrees to support Asha at the Kingsmoot, but worries she will not get enough support and offers to make her heir to the Ten Towers. After Euron wins the Kingsmoot, Rodrik advises Asha to flee the Iron Islands, fearing Euron will kill her to prevent his rule from being challenged. After capturing the Shield Islands, Euron makes Harras Lord of Greyshield to weaken Rodrik's power. Rodrik questions Euron's intent to conquer Westeros and claims to have sailed to Valyria, infuriating Euron.

==== Dagmer ====
Dagmer is the master-at-arms of House Greyjoy and captain of a longship called Foamdrinker. He is called "Cleftjaw" on account of a disfiguring axe-blow to his face. Despite being a commoner, he is infamous in the North. A descendant of a Greyjoy bastard a few generations back, he is one of the few Ironborn to show happiness at Theon's return. Theon, in turn, has fond memories of him—he notes that Dagmer has smiled at him more often than Balon and Eddard together. Dagmer accompanies Theon and Aeron in leaving the Stony Shore, leading a diversion against the Northern castle Torrhen's Square that allows Theon to capture Winterfell. In A Dance with Dragons, it is revealed that he holds Torrhen's Square with his crew.

==== Wex Pyke ====
Wex Pyke is the twelve-year-old bastard nephew of one of Balon's vassals. He is made Theon's squire. Wex is born mute, a fact that belies his cunning. He is among Theon's crew that captures Winterfell and the only one to survive when Ramsay sacks the castle. While hiding in the heart tree in the godswood, he sees Bran and Rickon flee with Osha and the Reed children. When Rickon and Osha split from the rest of the group, he follows them, learning that they have traveled to the supposedly savage Northern colonies on the island of Skagos. Eventually falling under Manderly control, Wex is able to communicate the location of Rickon, as well as that Theon was not responsible for the sack of Winterfell, to Lords Wyman Manderly and Robett Glover. Glover has started teaching him to read and write to find the true culprit.

== House Martell ==
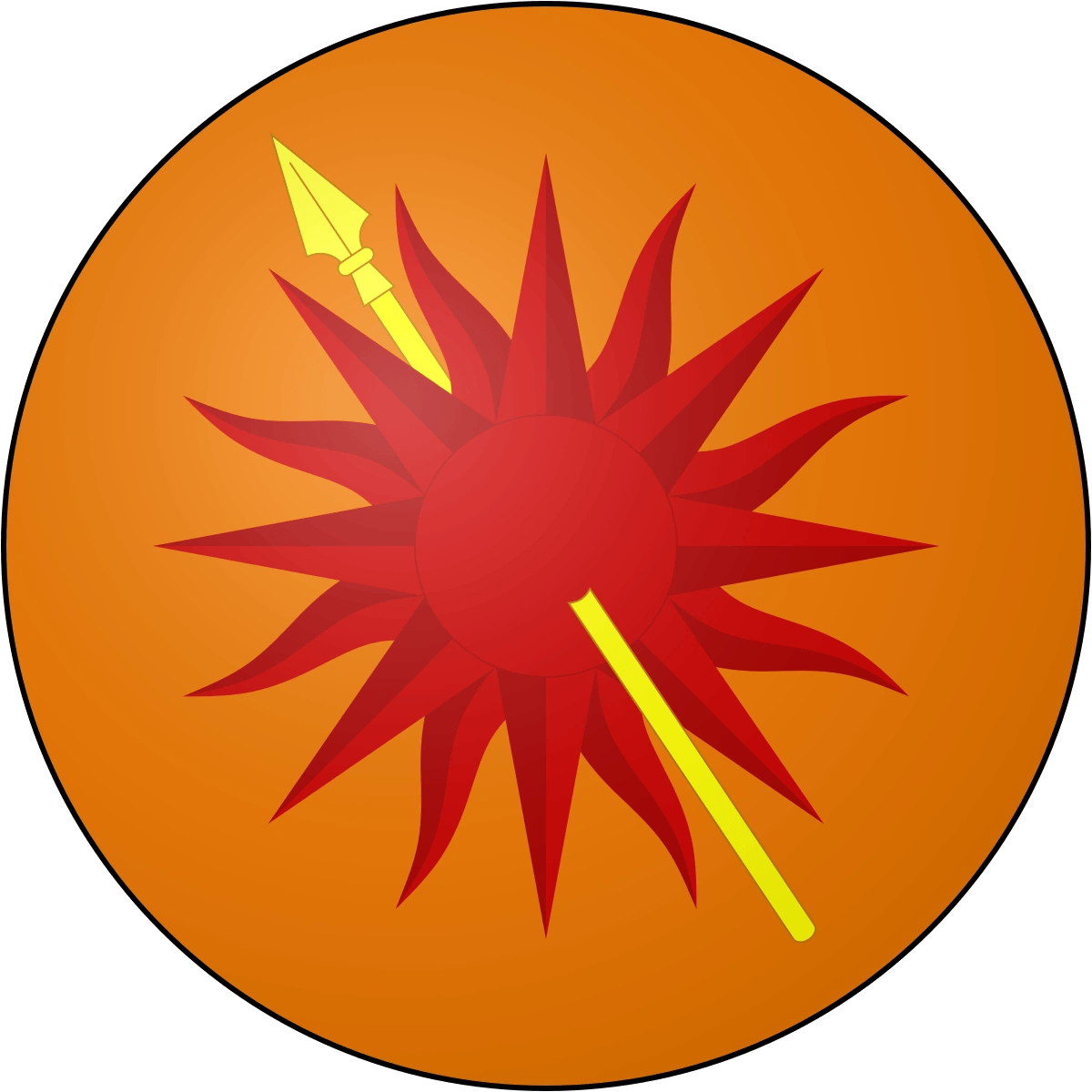
Coat of arms of House Martell

In Martin's fictional world, House Martell is one of the Great Houses of the Seven Kingdoms and is the ruling house of the kingdom of Dorne. Its seat is the castle of Sunspear. Its coat of arms displays a gold spear piercing a red sun on an orange field, and its words are Unbowed, Unbent, Unbroken. Bastards born in Dorne are generally given the surname "Sand". Dorne, along with House Martell, is culturally, ethnically, and politically distinct from the rest of the kingdoms. The rulers of Dorne are styled Prince or Princess because Dorne resisted direct conquest and joined the rest of the Seven Kingdoms through marriage.

House Martell was an Andal house established in Dorne during the Andal invasion, when they defeated the ruling First Men houses such as the Wades and the Shells. Nevertheless, they remained vassals to other monarchs, including those of Houses Jordayne, Allyrion, and Yronwood, while maintaining their own territorial holdings. The prominence of House Martell increased with the arrival of the Rhoynish warrior-queen Nymeria in Dorne, accompanied by the remnants of the Rhoynish people fleeing the destruction caused by the Valyrian Freehold during the Rhoynish Wars. Lord Mors Martell wed Nymeria and used their combined strength to subdue all his rivals and unify Dorne into one principality. Their marriage would also see the Martells adopt Rhoynish customs in place of Andal ones, with much of their civilization, such as the Spear Tower and the Tower of the Sun, built in Rhoynish fashion.

The Martells of Sunspear, along with Dorne, stood out in the Seven Kingdoms of Westeros as the only realm to resist Aegon Targaryen's conquest. The Dornish used guerrilla warfare instead of fielding large armies—partly to avoid another Field of Fire—and hid in strong palaces to evade the Burning of Harrenhal. They attacked the Targaryen armies when the dragons were not in the sky and escaped whenever the dragons took flight. House Martell achieved a significant Dornish victory against the Targaryens by killing Meraxes and Queen Rhaenys with a scorpion.

Family tree of House Martell

Princess of Dorne | Lewyn
Doran | Mellario of Norvos | Mors | Olyvar | Elia | Rhaegar; Targaryen | Ellaria; Sand | Oberyn "The Red Viper"
Arianne | Quentyn | Trystane | Rhaenys; Targaryen | Aegon; Targaryen | Obara; Sand | Nymeria; Sand | Tyene; Sand
Elia; Sand | Obella; Sand | Dorea; Sand | Loreza; Sand | Sarella; Sand

=== Family ===
==== Doran Martell ====
Doran Martell is the Prince of Dorne and the Lord of Sunspear. He is the father of Arianne, Quentyn, and Trystane Martell. By A Game of Thrones, he is in his fifties, and his gout leaves him barely able to walk and dependent on a wheeled chair. He is a cautious, pensive man who does not display his emotions. He swears loyalty to Joffrey only after Myrcella Baratheon is betrothed to Trystane by Tyrion Lannister, sending her off to Dorne. Tyrion also gives him a position on Joffrey's council. In A Storm of Swords, Doran sends his brother Oberyn to claim the position. After Oberyn's death, Doran refuses to start a war and returns to Sunspear to reassume control of his principality. He imprisons Oberyn's vengeful daughters, called the Sand Snakes (who have been calling for war over the death of their father), to maintain peace. After foiling his daughter Arianne's attempt to crown Myrcella the Queen of the Seven Kingdoms, he reveals that he has long been planning the downfall of Tywin Lannister to avenge Elia and intends to ally Dorne with House Targaryen by sending Arianne and Quentyn to seek out Aegon "Young Griff" Targaryen and Daenerys Targaryen, respectively.

==== Arianne Martell ====
Arianne Martell is the eldest child of Prince Doran Martell of Dorne and heir to Sunspear. She serves as the third-person narrator for two chapters in A Feast for Crows, and will be the narrator for at least two chapters in The Winds of Winter. She is cunning and beautiful and is also close with her cousins, the Sand Snakes. By A Feast for Crows, she is dissatisfied with her father, believing him to be weak. She plans to name Myrcella Baratheon the Queen of the Seven Kingdoms, as by Dornish law Myrcella inherits the title over her brother. Arianne seduces Arys Oakheart to win his support of Myrcella's claim. The plot is foiled, and Myrcella is wounded in the kidnapping attempt. As Arianne confronts Doran after he foils her plans, her father reveals that he has been plotting revenge on Tywin Lannister for many years and was waiting for the perfect time to strike. After the Golden Company invades Westeros, Doran sends Arianne to find out the truth about Aegon Targaryen. Her fate is unknown.

==== Quentyn Martell ====
Ser Quentyn Martell is the second child and oldest son of Doran Martell. He serves as the third-person narrator for four chapters in A Dance with Dragons. He is described as intelligent, serious, and dutiful, though not particularly handsome. In A Dance with Dragons, it is revealed that Doran Martell sent Quentyn to marry Daenerys Targaryen and bring her to Dorne. On the way, most of Quentyn's companions die. He and his remaining two friends, Archibald Yronwood and Gerris Drinkwater, are forced to become sellswords to reach Slaver's Bay. Daenerys politely refuses the offer. Not wanting to leave empty-handed, Quentyn tries to take one of Daenerys's dragons as a mount to impress her, but is killed by her dragons in front of his guards.

==== Trystane Martell ====
Trystane Martell is the youngest child of Doran Martell. To ensure House Martell's loyalty to the throne, it is arranged that he will marry Myrcella Baratheon when they come of age.

==== Elia Martell ====
Elia Martell, the younger sister of Prince Doran Martell of Dorne, was very close to her younger brother Oberyn. She married Prince Rhaegar Targaryen and bore him two children: a daughter, Rhaenys, and a son, Aegon. Fifteen years before the events of the series, Rhaegar was killed in battle during Robert's Rebellion. When the capital city was sacked by House Lannister, she was raped and murdered by Gregor Clegane. Elia's brother Oberyn, however, believed Tywin had Elia murdered to avenge the slight to his honor when Aerys had his son and heir married to Elia instead of Tywin's daughter, Cersei.

==== Oberyn Martell ====
Oberyn Martell is the younger brother of Doran Martell. He is described as a hot-headed, forceful, and lustful man with a quick wit and a barbed tongue. He is a formidable fighter and is called the "Red Viper" because it is rumored that he poisons his weapons. In A Storm of Swords, he leads a Dornish envoy to King's Landing to claim the seat on the Small Council on behalf of his brother, Prince Doran Martell, and obtain justice for his sister Elia Martell's murder.

==== Ellaria Sand ====
Ellaria Sand is the paramour of Prince Oberyn Martell and the mother of the four youngest "Sand Snakes". She accompanies Oberyn to King's Landing when Oberyn takes the seat on the Small Council. After returning to Dorne, she is distraught when she hears Obara's statement on how the Mountain's death "is a start," as she sees the futility of it and worries about her own daughters' safety.

==== The Sand Snakes ====
The name "Sand Snakes" refers to Prince Oberyn Martell's eight illegitimate daughters: Obara, Nymeria, Tyene, Sarella, Elia, Obella, Dorea, and Loreza. The latter four were born to Oberyn's paramour, Ellaria Sand. The older four, however, were born to different women: Obara to an Oldtown prostitute; Nymeria (also known as Lady Nym) to a noblewoman in Volantis; Tyene to a septa serving the Faith of the Seven; and Sarella to the (female) captain of the Summer Isles trading ship Feathered Kiss. They are collectively called "Sand Snakes" in reference to their father's nickname, "Red Viper," and the regional custom of giving Dornish highborn illegitimate children the bastard surname "Sand".

In A Feast for Crows, Obara, Nymeria, and Tyene Sand wish revenge for their father's death and pressure their paternal uncle, Prince Doran Martell, to declare war. When they are implicated in various plots to agitate the Dornish populace, Prince Doran catches wind of their plans and orders Areo Hotah to arrest the three Sand Snakes to prevent them from leading Dorne into war.

In A Dance with Dragons, Doran releases the three imprisoned Sand Snakes and sends them on individual missions in his covert plot to bring down House Lannister in revenge for the murder of Elia Martell and her children during the Sack of King's Landing. Obara is sent to accompany the visiting Kingsguard knight Ser Balon Swann to High Hermitage so he can hunt down and kill the rogue knight Gerold Dayne for the mutilating attack on Princess Myrcella Baratheon. Nymeria is sent to King's Landing to take the vacant Dornish seat on the Small Council in her late father's place (and serve as an agent from the inside). Tyene is sent to accompany her half-sister Nymeria to King's Landing disguised as a septa and gain the confidence of the High Sparrow.

The status of the fourth Sand Snake, Sarella Sand, is unknown, though according to Prince Doran she is said to be playing some sort of "game" in Oldtown. Sarella is famous for her insatiable academic curiosities, and there are fan speculations that she is actually disguised as a male Citadel acolyte named Alleras ("Sarella" spelt backwards) with the nickname "the Sphinx", who debuts in the prologue of A Feast for Crows and helps Samwell Tarly when he arrives at the Citadel. In the ending chapter of A Feast for Crows, Alleras is tasked by the departing Archmaester Marwyn to take good care of Samwell as the latter starts his maester training.

In two of pre-released chapters from the yet-unfinished The Winds of Winter, the fifth Sand Snake, Elia Sand, nicknamed "Lady Lance" due to her tomboyish love of jousting, accompanies her cousin, Princess Arianne Martell, on the diplomatic journey to meet with Jon Connington and the allegedly-surviving Aegon Targaryen.

=== Servants ===
==== Areo Hotah ====
Areo Hotah is the captain of Prince Doran Martell's guards. He serves as the third-person narrator for two chapters throughout A Feast for Crows and A Dance with Dragons. He was born as the youngest of a large family in Norvos. Areo is steadfastly loyal to Doran. He helps foil Arianne Martell's plot to name Myrcella Baratheon the Queen of the Seven Kingdoms, killing Arys Oakheart in the process.

== House Tully ==
Coat of arms of House Tully

House Tully is one of the Great Houses of the Seven Kingdoms and is the principal house in the Riverlands. Its seat is at Riverrun. Its coat of arms displays a leaping silver trout on a field of rippling blue and red stripes, and its words are Family, Duty, Honor. Bastards born in the Riverlands are generally given the surname "Rivers". When House Targaryen invaded Westeros, Lord Tully was among the first to welcome the invaders. In return, the Targaryens made House Tully the principal house of the Riverlands.

Family tree of House Tully

Hoster | Minisa; Whent | Brynden "The Blackfish"
3 sons | Catelyn | Eddard; Stark | Petyr; Baelish | Lysa | Jon; Arryn | Edmure | Roslin; Frey
Robb; Stark | Sansa; Stark | Arya; Stark | Brandon; Stark | Rickon; Stark | Robert; Arryn

=== Family ===
==== Hoster Tully ====
Hoster Tully is the Lord of Riverrun and Lord Paramount of the Trident. He is the father of Catelyn Stark, Lysa Arryn, and Edmure Tully. He often quarrels with his brother Brynden because Brynden refuses to be married. Years before the events of the series, he agreed to foster Petyr Baelish at Riverrun as a ward. When he discovered that Lysa was pregnant with Petyr's child, he sent Petyr away and tricked Lysa into drinking an abortifacient potion. Hoster supported Robert Baratheon, House Stark, and House Arryn in the rebellion against House Targaryen on the condition that Catelyn and Lysa be wed into the Stark and Arryn families, respectively. His health deteriorates rapidly over the novels; he eventually dies and is laid to rest in the river following the Tully tradition.

==== Minisa Whent ====
Minisa Tully was the Lady of Riverrun. She is the mother of Catelyn Stark, a major point-of-view character in the first three novels. Minisa is also the mother of Catelyn's two older brothers, who died in infancy, and later Lysa Arryn, two years after Catelyn.

Many years later, she finally gave birth to a son and male heir: Edmure Tully, her fifth-born child and the first son to survive infancy. This meant that Catelyn was no longer Hoster's heir. She died from childbirth complications with her sixth child, Edmure's younger brother, over a decade before the beginning of the novels.

==== Edmure Tully ====
Edmure Tully is the fifth child, only living son, and heir of Lord Hoster Tully at the beginning of A Game of Thrones (1996). He is dutiful and wishes to earn his father's respect and protect the common people of the Riverlands. However, he is also said to have a large heart, and his decisions are often rash and emotional. He takes command of the Riverlands in A Game of Thrones because of his father's illness and is taken captive by Jaime Lannister. He is rescued by his nephew Robb Stark, and upon hearing of Eddard Stark's death, he leads the Riverlands lords in proclaiming Robb the King in the North. He defeats Tywin Lannister's right-hand man, Gregor Clegane ("the Mountain"), in battle and unwittingly ruins Robb's plan to destroy Tywin's army. As amends for thwarting Robb's plan, he agrees to marry Roslin Frey and repair the alliance with House Frey. The wedding is a trap, and the Stark–Tully army is massacred, thereby breaching ancient guest rights. Edmure is taken to Casterly Rock, where he and the remaining members of House Tully are to spend the rest of their lives as prisoners to House Lannister. Roslin is to remain at the Twins, and the pair is promised to be reunited after the birth of their child.

==== Brynden Tully ====
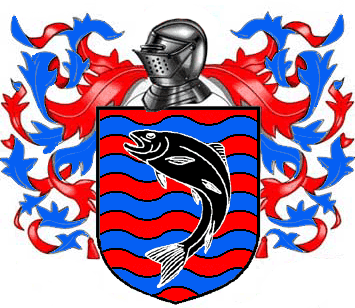
Personal coat of arms of Brynden Tully

Ser Brynden Tully, called the Blackfish, is the younger brother of Hoster Tully and the uncle of Catelyn Stark, Lysa Arryn, and Edmure Tully. He constantly quarreled with his brother, usually over Brynden's refusal to marry. During one encounter, Hoster called him the black goat of House Tully. Brynden mused that since their sigil was a fish, he was the "Blackfish" of the family. He accompanied Lysa to the Vale. In A Game of Thrones, he is upset over the Vale's neutrality in the ongoing war. He resigns from his position and joins Robb Stark and his bannermen. He is appointed head of Robb's outriders and is a crucial member of the war council. His efforts win Robb several battles throughout A Clash of Kings. He is named Warden of the Southern Marches in A Storm of Swords and remains at Riverrun while Robb goes to the Twins to attend Edmure's wedding. After Robb's death, Brynden holds Riverrun in Robb's name, but he is besieged by House Lannister and House Frey. In A Feast for Crows, Brynden surrenders the Tully seat of Riverrun to spare further bloodshed, but he himself escapes capture. His whereabouts are unknown.

=== Vassals ===
Vassals under House Tully include House Blackwood of Raventree Hall, House Bracken of Stone Hedge, House Darry of Castle Darry, House Mallister of Seagard, House Piper of Pinkmaiden, House Ryger of Willow Wood, House Frey of the Crossing, and House Mooten of Maidenpool. The Lords of Harrenhal are also historically vassals to the Lords Tully.

==== Walder Frey ====
Coat of arms of House Frey

Walder Frey is Lord of the Twins, and a vassal to House Tully. He is called the Lord of the Crossing as the placement of his castle allows him to control who crosses the river, giving Walder Frey considerable strategic importance. He is known for having over a hundred descendants from his eight wives. He emphasizes family loyalty and believes in taking care of relations, including those who disappoint him. Although he is a bannerman of House Tully, he did not arrive at the Battle of the Trident during Robert's Rebellion until it was almost over (leading to him being referred to derogatorily as the "Late Walder Frey"). He also does not immediately go to Riverrun when Edmure Tully summons his vassals to support Robb Stark in A Game of Thrones.

Since crossing the Twins is a necessity for Robb, Walder is able to negotiate marriage contracts between his house and House Stark. When Robb marries Jeyne Westerling in A Clash of Kings, Frey is outraged and withdraws his support from Robb to conspire with Tywin Lannister and Roose Bolton to exact revenge. In A Storm of Swords, Walder pretends to make amends with Robb and agrees to marry his daughter Roslin to Edmure. The wedding is a trap: Robb, his key supporters, and most of his army are massacred during the feast, a direct violation of ancient guest right customs, in what becomes known as the Red Wedding. He then swears loyalty to House Lannister, and his second son Emmon Frey receives Riverrun, the seat of House Tully, as a reward, with advantageous marriages for other descendants. The people of the Riverlands refuse to support his rule, and a shadowy guerrilla war erupts that Walder Frey struggles to control, with numerous Freys and allies being hanged by the Brotherhood without Banners or killed by those who want vengeance. House Frey is so large and factional that many of the Freys hate each other, aspiring to become Lord of the Crossing.

== House Tyrell ==
Coat of arms of House Tyrell

House Tyrell is described as one of the Great Houses of the Seven Kingdoms and is the principal noble house in the Reach. Its seat is at Highgarden, where they reside as the Wardens of the South. Its coat of arms displays a golden rose on a green field, and its words are Growing Strong. Bastards born in the Reach are generally given the surname "Flowers". When the former rulers of the Reach, House Gardener, were killed in battle against House Targaryen, the Targaryens raised the Tyrells from stewards of Highgarden to Lords of Highgarden. Because House Florent had a better claim to Highgarden, the Tyrells are often seen as "upjumped stewards" by the lords of the Reach and other Great Houses; however, the women of the Tyrell household are noted for being shrewd and clever leaders.

Family tree of House Tyrell

Luthor | Olenna Redwyne | Gormon | Garth | Moryn
Mace | Alerie Hightower | Janna | Jon Fossoway | Mina | Paxter Redwyne | Garse Flowers | Garrett Flowers | Luthor | Elyn Norridge | Leo "The Lazy"
Willas | Garlan | Leonette Fossoway | Horas; Redwyne | Hobber; Redwyne | Desmera; Redwyne | Theodore | Lia Serry | Olene | Leo Blackbar | Medwick
Loras | Margaery | Renly Baratheon | Elinor | Luthor
Joffrey; Baratheon
Tommen; Baratheon

=== Family ===
==== Mace Tyrell ====
Lord Mace Tyrell is the Lord of Highgarden, Defender of the Marches, High Marshal of the Reach, and Warden of the South. He has three sons—Willas, Garlan, and Loras—and one daughter, Margaery. He is described as a prematurely old, tedious man who lacks political savvy and is thought to serve as a figurehead for his mother, Olenna. In A Clash of Kings, he supports the marriage between Margaery and Renly Baratheon, who plans to usurp the throne of the Seven Kingdoms. When Renly dies, Mace accepts an offer to marry Margaery to Joffrey Baratheon, the current king. After his and Tywin's armies defeat Stannis Baratheon, Mace is given a seat on the King's council. After Cersei's downfall, Kevan Lannister, Regent of the Seven Kingdoms, names Mace his Hand, mostly to repair the relationship between their houses. Mace then tries to fill the Small Council with his vassals, greedy for more power.

==== Alerie Tyrell ====
Lady Alerie Tyrell, née Hightower, is the Lady of Highgarden and the wife of Mace Tyrell. Her younger sister, Lynesse, is the estranged second wife of Jorah Mormont of Bear Island. She is tall with long silver hair, and joins Margaery's entourage to King's Landing upon her betrothal to King Joffrey Baratheon. Following Tywin Lannister's funeral, she leaves the capital with her son Garlan.

==== Willas Tyrell ====
Lord Willas Tyrell is the heir of Highgarden and the eldest child of Mace Tyrell and Alerie Hightower. He is disabled with a bad leg following an accident in a tourney he entered as a young man. His competitor was Oberyn Martell, the Red Viper of Dorne. In the book series, he is described as intelligent, studious, educated, and kind, and is renowned for breeding the finest hawks, hounds, and horses in the Seven Kingdoms.

He is briefly betrothed to Sansa Stark, until she is forced to marry Tyrion Lannister. Prior to this, Arianne Martell attempted to travel to Highgarden to marry Willas, but was stopped by Oberyn.

==== Garlan Tyrell ====
Ser Garlan Tyrell is the secondborn son of Mace Tyrell and Alerie Hightower. He is married to Leonette Fossoway and is a knight.

Garlan is often called Garlan the Gallant, a name his older brother, Willas, gave him in Garlan's youth. Garlan was overweight as a child, and Willas wanted to give him a noble moniker before he earned a less flattering one.

Garlan is a skilled swordsman. When training, he does so against 2-3 men at once, feeling it prepares him better for battle. His younger brother, Loras, a Knight of the Kingsguard, has said that Garlan is the superior fighter with a sword.

Garlan disdains glory and values humility, traits that make him little-known as a warrior. Only his direct family seems to know of his skill.

During the Battle of Blackwater Bay in A Clash of Kings, he wore the dead Renly Baratheon's armor into battle to frighten the soldiers of Stannis Baratheon. The ruse was successful, and it was reported that 'Renly's ghost' fought in the battle.

In A Storm of Swords, he speaks highly of Tyrion Lannister and attempts to assuage Sansa's concerns about marrying him, after her betrothal to Garlan's older brother Willas is prevented.

In A Feast for Crows, Margaery, Garlan's younger sister, is arrested on charges of infidelity to the king. She requests that he represent her in a trial by combat—a notable request considering that her other brother Loras is a Knight of the Kingsguard. Cersei informs her that Garlan cannot represent her because Margaery is the Queen and he is not a member of the Kingsguard.

==== Loras Tyrell ====
Ser Loras Tyrell, nicknamed the Knight of Flowers, is the third son of Mace Tyrell. He is a young but highly skilled knight and jouster. He is beloved by the crowds, and many young girls are infatuated with him. Many believe him to be rash and headstrong, but count him among the greatest knights of the realm. When Renly Baratheon, Loras' lover, claims the Iron Throne in A Clash of Kings, Loras supports him and is made head of Renly's personal guard. After Renly's assassination, Loras is enraged with grief, blaming Brienne of Tarth and Catelyn Stark for Renly's death and murdering two of his fellow Kingsguard. Afterward, Loras becomes more withdrawn and angry, blaming himself, and vows never to love again. In A Storm of Swords, he questions Brienne and finally decides that she is not the killer. When his sister Margaery is married to Joffrey Baratheon, he joins the Kingsguard. He volunteers to lead the assault on Dragonstone in A Feast for Crows so Cersei Lannister will send military assistance to defend his native Highgarden from the Greyjoys. He successfully captures Dragonstone but is badly wounded and near death. By the end of A Dance with Dragons, he barely clings to life. His fate is unknown.

==== Margaery Tyrell ====
Margaery Tyrell /ˈmɑːrdʒəri tɪˈrɛl/ is the youngest child and only daughter of Mace Tyrell. She is an intelligent, beautiful, and shrewd young woman, and despite being only sixteen, she is manipulative and adept at political intrigue. She is also quite moral and has a kind heart.

==== Olenna Tyrell ====
Olenna Tyrell, also known as the Queen of Thorns, was born into House Redwyne and is the mother of Mace Tyrell and widow of the late Luthor Tyrell. She is described as a wizened and cunning older woman with a wicked wit and a sharp tongue, and is known for openly stating her opinion.

=== Vassals ===
==== Randyll Tarly ====
Randyll Tarly is the head of House Tarly, bannerman of House Tyrell, and considered to be one of the finest military commanders in Westeros. He is also the father of Samwell Tarly, whom he believes to be an embarrassment. When word of the imprisonment of Margaery Tyrell reaches Randyll, he marches his army to King's Landing, where Kevan Lannister makes him the new Master of Laws.

== The North ==
=== Night's Watch ===
Coat of arms of the Night's Watch

The Night's Watch is a sworn brotherhood of men who patrol the Wall. The individual "brothers of the Watch" (called "Crows" by the wildlings) (Note: Kornhaber, Spencer; Orr, Christopher; Sullivan, Amy (June 9, 2014). "Game of Thrones: A Spectacular Battle, With One Big Disappointment (Our roundtable on "The Watchers on the Wall," the ninth episode of the fourth season of the HBO show.)". The Atlantic. Archived from the original on August 10, 2015. e.g., "In the book, the skirmish between the wildling raiding party and the Crows at Castle Black—and with it, Ygritte's death—comes long before the arrival of Mance's army north of the Wall." "But the characters up north just aren't as exciting: Jon Snow is the one Thrones hero without a personality; Sam is sort of compelling, but in a pitiable way; I can't really keep the names of any of the other crows straight.")) reject land and titles, practice celibacy, cut ties to their families, assume neutrality in realm politics, and never desert their assignments, the penalty for desertion being death. Joining the Watch is still considered an honor because any man can rise through its ranks regardless of illegitimacy or criminal past. However, in the first book, the Watch is severely undermanned. The Watch is based at Castle Black, where the Lord Commander of the Watch resides, and new recruits are trained.

==== Jeor Mormont ====
Jeor Mormont, often called the "Old Bear", is the Lord Commander of the Night's Watch. He was the Lord of Bear Island in the North but joined the Watch to pass the title to his son, Jorah Mormont. Mormont is considered a strong, resolute leader and commands respect. He keeps a raven capable of speaking simple phrases as a pet. In A Game of Thrones, he chooses Jon Snow as his steward and potential successor. Soon afterwards, a wight (a dead body reanimated by the Others) attempts to kill him, but Jon kills it. In gratitude, Mormont gives Jon his ancestral sword, Longclaw, and changes its pommel to a wolf's head in accordance with the House Stark sigil. To investigate the return of wights, the disappearance of several Watch rangers, and rumors of a wildling army, Jeor leads an expedition beyond the Wall in A Clash of Kings. His force is annihilated by Others and an army of wights in A Storm of Swords. He leads the survivors to Craster's Keep, where he is killed in a mutiny.

==== Maester Aemon ====
Aemon Targaryen is the older brother of Aegon V, the third son of Maekar I, and a member of the Night's Watch. Decades before the events of A Game of Thrones, he was sent to the Citadel in Oldtown on the orders of his grandfather, Daeron II, who felt there were too many Targaryens, and became a maester (one of an order of scholars and healers). He was later offered the throne of the Seven Kingdoms after the death of his father, Maekar, but ceded the rule to Aegon and joined the Night's Watch. This allowed him to survive the overthrow and purge of his family in Robert's Rebellion. By the time of A Game of Thrones, he is elderly and blind, but he provides guidance to the men at Castle Black and is greatly respected within the Night's Watch. In A Feast for Crows, Jon Snow sends him to the Citadel by sea, but Maester Aemon catches a fever during a storm and dies on the voyage between Braavos and Oldtown.

==== Yoren ====
Yoren is a recruiter of the Night's Watch. In A Game of Thrones, Yoren travels with Tyrion Lannister from the Wall to King's Landing and is present when Tyrion is arrested by Catelyn Stark. He then races to King's Landing to inform Eddard Stark. During Lord Eddard's execution, he finds Arya Stark and shields her from seeing her father's death. In A Clash of Kings, he disguises Arya as a boy recruit to smuggle her to Winterfell but is killed by Lannister soldiers.

==== Samwell Tarly ====
Samwell Tarly, typically called Sam, is the elder son of Lord Randyll Tarly of Horn Hill. Ten chapters across A Storm of Swords and A Feast for Crows are told from his point of view. Despite his self-professed cowardice, Sam is highly intelligent, resourceful, and loyal. Sam's lack of martial ability and his interest in scholarly pursuits convince his father that he is an unworthy heir, and he is forced to join the Night's Watch.

==== Janos Slynt ====
Janos Slynt was a former Commander of the City Watch in King's Landing and a brother in the Night's Watch. He first appears in A Game of Thrones as commander of the City Watch. Slynt is known for his corruption, but Robert was persuaded not to remove him because the next commander might be worse. After Robert's death, when Ned intends to depose Joffrey, Slynt orders his men to arrest Ned. For this, Janos Slynt was made a lord and given Harrenhal.

In A Clash of Kings, Tyrion Lannister exiles Slynt to the Night's Watch as he cannot be trusted. In A Storm of Swords, Slynt attempts to be elected as Lord Commander of the Night's Watch but loses to Jon Snow. After Slynt repeatedly refuses Jon's orders, Jon publicly executes him.

==== Alliser Thorne ====
Alliser Thorne is the Master of Arms at Castle Black, a warrior charged with training the Watch's recruits. Thorne was originally a Targaryen loyalist who, after the fall of House Targaryen at the hands of Ned and Robert, was forced to join the Night's Watch. He harbors deep resentment toward House Stark for this fate. When Jon arrives at Castle Black, Thorne personally torments, humiliates, and provokes Jon whenever possible.

==== Bowen Marsh ====
Bowen Marsh is the First Steward of the Night's Watch, which is based at Castle Black. He oversees the day-to-day running of the Night's Watch, handling supplies, funding, logistics, and communications. During A Dance with Dragons, Bowen becomes disillusioned by the decisions made by Jon Snow as Lord Commander. Fearing for the future safety of the Night's Watch, Bowen and several of his followers stab Jon.

==== Eddison Tollett ====
Eddison Tollett, also known as "Dolorous Edd" for his melancholy temperament, sarcastic wit, and pessimistic dry humor, is a squire from House Tollett and a steward of the Night's Watch. He is one of Jon Snow's closest friends at Castle Black. Edd survives the battle with the wights at the Fist of the First Men and is among the survivors to make it back to Craster's Keep. In A Dance with Dragons, Edd carries on his duties as the Lord Commander's steward. He is one of the men brought along as muscle to assist Lord Commander Jon Snow in escorting Janos Slynt for his execution.

==== Waymar Royce ====
Waymar Royce is a young Night's Watch ranger who leads two other rangers, the equally young Will and Gared, a man in his 50s, after a group of wildlings in the prologue scene of the first novel, A Game of Thrones. Although Will, the scout, reports finding dead wildlings near a stream beyond a ridge, Royce refuses to go back to Castle Black. Despite Gared's worries about the bad weather and Will's gut feeling that something sinister is happening, Royce wants to verify whether the wildlings were just sleeping. He is eventually killed by a White Walker and turned into a wight, then kills Will. This marks the first clearly shown death of a character in the series.

=== Free Folk ===
Wildlings, also called Free Folk, are people who live beyond the Wall. They live in independent villages and have no central government. Bands of wildlings often cross the Wall for plunder. In A Storm of Swords, the wildlings unite under Mance Rayder, the self-styled "King-beyond-the-Wall", and invade the Seven Kingdoms to escape the return of the Others. With the help of Jon and Stannis Baratheon, they settle in the North. Many move into the abandoned castles to defend the Wall.

==== Mance Rayder ====
Mance Rayder is a former member of the Night's Watch who deserted. Since then, he has become known as "King-beyond-the-Wall". In A Storm of Swords, he unites all the wildlings under his command and leads them to attack the Wall from the south, trying to guide his people to safety from the advancing White Walkers. His vanguard is defeated by Jon Snow at the Wall. During a parley with Jon, Stannis Baratheon and his army rout the wildlings, and Mance is taken prisoner. Stannis orders Mance to be burned alive in A Dance with Dragons, but Jon later discovers that the priestess Melisandre used magic to disguise Rayder as the wildling who was burned in his place, escaping execution. Jon orders Mance to rescue Arya Stark, not knowing the girl is actually Jeyne Poole. In Winterfell, the party secretly kills off several of Roose Bolton's men, creating tension in Winterfell, and enlists the help of Theon Greyjoy to smuggle Jeyne out of the castle, but Mance is forced to stay behind. Ramsay Bolton later sends a letter to Jon claiming that he has captured Mance and is holding him prisoner.

==== Ygritte ====
Ygritte (/ˈiːɡrɪt/) is a wildling spearwife renowned for her fierce and headstrong nature and considered by many wildlings to be beautiful due to her exceptionally red hair. However, Jon Snow considers her rather plain-looking. Ygritte first encounters Jon in A Clash of Kings, when she and her band of three wildling scouts are surprise-attacked by a group of Night's Watch rangers led by the famed Qhorin Halfhand, among whom is a young recruit, Jon Snow. Most of her band is killed, and she is personally captured by Jon, but Jon refuses the order to execute Ygritte because of her gender, and later releases her in secret. She rejoins the wildlings and is present when Rattleshirt traps Qhorin and Jon in a cave, resulting in Jon feigning surrender by killing Qhorin. Ygritte speaks up for Jon when other wildlings raise suspicion towards Jon, and again when Mance Rayder doubts Jon's sincerity since he did not inform the wildlings of Lord Commander Mormont's ranging. Ygritte voluntarily transfers to Tormund Giantsbane's group to stay with Jon, and they begin a sexual relationship as the wildling raiders attached to Thenn leader Styr are sent to scale over the Wall on Mance's orders, aiming to attack Castle Black from the rear. Ygritte continues to defend Jon, but when Jon defects at Queenscrown to return to the Night's Watch, she shoots Jon in the calf with an arrow on the run. Ygritte later participates in Styr's attack on Castle Black, and is fatally shot in the chest by an arrow in the ensuing battle and dies in Jon's arms.

==== Craster ====
Craster is a wildling who lives north of the Wall in a fortified homestead called Craster's Keep. According to Ygritte, he was fathered by a member of the Night's Watch with a wildling from Whitetree. A regrettable ally of the Night's Watch, Craster has nineteen wives. When his daughters are old enough, he marries them and incestuously fathers new children. It is heavily implied that he sacrifices his sons to the Others. Whilst searching for Benjen Stark and his missing party, Jeor Mormont's expedition party stays a night at Craster's Keep, under strict conditions not to get involved with his wives. When they return after being attacked by the Others, an argument ensues when Craster denies members of the Night's Watch access to his food. This leads to a mutiny, resulting in his and Mormont's deaths.

==== Gilly ====
Gilly is a wildling girl, daughter and wife of Craster. After the Night's Watch regroups at Craster's Keep, Gilly gives birth to a son. Craster is killed before he can sacrifice the child, and in the confusion, Gilly flees south with Samwell, making it to the safety of the Wall. She is later sent south on a ship to Oldtown with Samwell and a boy who is ostensibly her child; in truth, Jon Snow swapped her child with that of Mance Rayder, to spare the innocent child from Melisandre's flames on account of his king's blood.

==== Val ====
Val is the sister of Mance Rayder's wife, Dalla. After the failed wildling incursion, she is kept prisoner at the Wall. She is described as attractive. In A Dance with Dragons, Jon Snow sends her alone to bring a wildling warlord, Tormund, and his people to the Wall. The mission is successful. She does not appear in the show.

==== Lord of Bones ====
The Lord of Bones (also mocked as "Rattleshirt") is a wildling leader under Mance Rayder, known for his vileness and cowardice. In A Dance with Dragons, he is executed under the guise of Mance, as Melisandre had glamoured him to take the appearance of the condemned king.

==== Tormund Giantsbane ====
Tormund, better known as "Tormund Giantsbane" or "Tormund Thunderfist", is a famous wildling raider.

==== Varamyr Sixskins ====
Varamyr is an infamous wildling skinchanger, nicknamed for controlling five other animals (three wolves, a shadowcat, and a snow bear). He is the POV character of the prologue chapter of A Dance With Dragons. Due to his skin-changing power, he maintains control over multiple wildling villages through terror and even aspired to be King-Beyond-the-Wall before joining Mance Rayder. After another skinchanger, Orell, is killed, he also assumes control of the eagle Orell leaves behind. When Stannis attacks the wildlings' army, Melisandre uses her magic to burn Varamyr's eagle, causing him to lose control of his remaining animals. When the wildling army is routed, Varamyr flees north together with a small group, hiding his real identity from them. The group eventually deserts, leaving only the spearwife named Thistle. Varamyr is stabbed by a boy when he attempts to take a squirrel-skin cloak off the dead body of the boy's mother. While Thistle treats his wound, knowing that he is dying, he attempts to take over her body. However, her mind fights back hard against him, and the subsequent hysteria inflicted on Thistle's body attracts wights to their position to kill them both. Before Varamyr dies, his mind wargs into his wolf, One Eye.

== King's Landing ==
The Royal Court at King's Landing is mostly composed of the King's Small Council and his Kingsguard, the seven knights sworn to protect the king and his family. All members of the Small Council, except for the Grand Maester, are appointed and dismissed by the king or The Hand.

=== Small Council ===
==== Petyr Baelish ====
Lord Petyr Baelish, called Littlefinger, held power as the Master of Coin, the treasurer of the Seven Kingdoms. Petyr names himself Lord Protector of the Vale following the death of his wife, Lysa Arryn.

==== Varys ====
Varys, called the Spider, is a eunuch who serves as Master of Whisperers, the spymaster for the king of the Seven Kingdoms. He is feared by nobles and common people alike. He is described as bald and fat, and he usually affects a fawning, effeminate manner. He knows all of the secret passages in the royal castle and his spies are found everywhere.

==== Pycelle ====
Pycelle is an elderly Maester, who for decades has served many kings as Grand Maester, the personal healer and scholar of the king. Although he is intelligent and highly educated, his effectiveness as an officer of the court has been dulled by his age. He is secretly an agent of influence for House Lannister: he convinced King Aerys II Targaryen to open the gates for Tywin Lannister during Robert's rebellion, he allowed Jon Arryn to die to keep the true parentage of Cersei Lannister's children secret, and would have killed King Robert Baratheon upon Cersei's command. Upon learning this, Tyrion Lannister has Pycelle removed from office and imprisoned. In A Storm of Swords, he is restored to his position. He objects to Queen Regent Cersei's decisions throughout A Feast for Crows, and she considers replacing him. When Cersei is arrested, Pycelle seizes control of the king's council and offers Kevan Lannister the regency. Together, they begin restoring order to the Seven Kingdoms. Pycelle is killed by Varys, who believes that he and Kevan's competent leadership threaten a Targaryen restoration.

==== Qyburn ====
Qyburn is a former Maester who lost his chain for unethical experiments. He is also rumored to dabble in necromancy. In A Clash of Kings, he is a member of the Brave Companions mercenary company. He later leaves the company in A Feast for Crows and joins the court in King's Landing. Queen Cersei Lannister allows him to experiment on the mortally wounded Gregor Clegane, presumably transforming Clegane into the monstrous Kingsguard knight, Ser Robert Strong.

=== Kingsguard ===
==== Barristan Selmy ====
Ser Barristan Selmy, called Barristan the Bold, is hailed as a hero throughout Westeros and is the Lord Commander of the Kingsguard. He serves as the third-person narrator for four chapters in A Dance with Dragons. Although he is over sixty years old at the start of the series, he remains a remarkable fighter and is the most celebrated and respected living knight. He has been a member of the Kingsguard for most of his life and served three kings. He remained loyal to House Targaryen during Robert Baratheon's rebellion, but he later accepted Robert's pardon and held his position as commander. Upon Joffrey's succession, Ser Barristan is sent into retirement, which he sees as a disgrace. In A Clash of Kings, he begins serving the exiled princess Daenerys Targaryen and later exposes Ser Jorah Mormont, Daenerys's most trusted adviser, as a former spy for King Robert. When Daenerys disappears in A Dance with Dragons, he becomes a POV narrator and launches a coup against her husband. He then reluctantly rules Meereen in her stead under the title the Queen's Hand until she returns.

==== Arys Oakheart ====
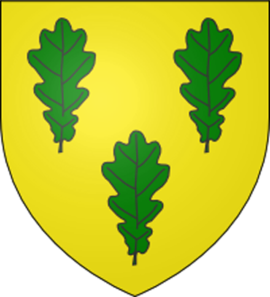
Coat of arms of House Oakheart

Ser Arys Oakheart is a knight of King Robert Baratheon's Kingsguard, and for Robert's subsequent heirs. He serves as the third-person narrator for one chapter in A Feast for Crows. Arys accompanies Myrcella Baratheon to Dorne, where he is seduced by Arianne Martell. Together, they plot to place Myrcella on the throne. After the plot is foiled, Arys is killed.

==== Meryn Trant ====
Ser Meryn Trant is a member of the kingsguard under King Robert Baratheon, King Joffrey Baratheon and King Tommen Baratheon.

When Joffrey tells Sansa of his plan to behead Robb Stark, she defies him by wishing to see his own head mounted there, for which Joffrey has Trant slap her. Along with the City Watch, he also murders King Robert's illegitimate children. When the Lannisters send their guards to capture Arya Stark, Trant kills Syrio Forel, her fencing instructor, who protects Arya despite only being armed with a wooden training sword, as a result Trant is one of the names on Arya Stark's list.

==== Balon Swann ====
Ser Balon Swann is the second son of Lord Gulian Swann. He is said to be skilled with the lance, Morningstar, and bow and arrow. He is made a Kingsguard after the death of Ser Preston Greenfield, which Tyrion Lannister approves of. During the Battle of the Blackwater, he fights valiantly against the forces of Stannis Baratheon. In A Feast For Crows, Cersei Lannister sends him to Dorne with the skull of Gregor Clegane, which he gives to Doran Martell. Doran later informs the Sand Snakes and Arianne Martell of Balon's involvement in a plan by Cersei to kill Trystane Martell and frame Tyrion. After learning of the attempted murder of Princess Myrcella, Balon leaves to chase Darkstar, the man who made the attempt on Myrcella's life.

=== Others ===
==== Ilyn Payne ====
Ser Ilyn Payne is the King's Justice, the royal executioner. Before the events of the series, King Aerys II Targaryen ordered his tongue cut out. He is a skilled headsman, seldom requiring a second stroke to finish his charges. Ilyn executes Lord Stark after his downfall. He serves as Jaime's sparring partner in A Feast for Crows.

==== The High Sparrow ====
The High Sparrow is a prominent member of the "sparrows", a religious movement formed during the War of the Five Kings, and is a member of the Faith of the Seven.

== Other characters ==
=== Westeros ===
==== Syrio Forel ====
Syrio Forel is the former First Sword of Braavos and a master of the Braavosi fighting style known as "water dancing". He instructs Arya in the ways of fencing. When the Lannisters send their guards to capture Arya, Syrio is killed by Meryn Trant, but not before Syrio dispatches all of the Lannister soldiers with no more than a wooden teaching sword, shattering kneecaps and stabbing out eyes, so that Arya can escape.

==== Thoros of Myr ====
Thoros is a red priest of R'hllor from the city of Myr. Before the events of the series, he was sent to King's Landing to convert King Aerys II Targaryen into a follower of R'hllor. He was unsuccessful and began to question his faith. When Robert Baratheon became king, Thoros became a frequent drinking companion of Robert's. He is a formidable fighter known for using a flaming sword. In A Game of Thrones, he is sent with Beric Dondarrion to arrest Gregor Clegane. When Dondarrion is killed, Thoros inadvertently resurrects him during the funeral service. By A Storm of Swords, the two had founded a band of outlaws called the Brotherhood Without Banners to stop the raiders ravaging the Riverlands. Thoros is continually able to resurrect Dondarrion whenever he is killed. When Lady Stoneheart takes leadership of the Brotherhood in A Feast for Crows, he does not dispute her, although he disapproves of her motives and methods.

==== Meribald ====
Meribald is a septon of the Riverlands. He guides Brienne of Tarth to the Quiet Isle to meet the Elder Brother.

==== Septa Unella ====
Septa Unella is a member of the Most Devout, the ruling council of the Faith of the Seven. Unella is the septa who forces Cersei Lannister to admit her crimes to her in A Feast for Crows.

=== Essos ===
==== Khal Drogo ====
Drogo is a powerful khal, or warlord, of the Dothraki people, a tribal nation of horse riders in the steppes beyond the Free Cities. He is an accomplished warrior and has never been defeated in battle. Hoping to gain his support to invade Westeros, Viserys Targaryen and Illyrio Mopatis arrange for Drogo to marry Daenerys Targaryen. After a tense wedding night, her growing sexual prowess and self-esteem ultimately result in him falling in love with her, proving himself to be a kind husband. Drogo also does not support Viserys' scheme to march on Westeros, eventually executing him after he threatens to kill Daenerys and their unborn child. After a failed attempt on her life by one of Robert Baratheon's spies, Drogo decides to lead his horde to conquer Westeros. However, during a battle, he receives an injury that eventually develops into sepsis. In a desperate attempt to save his life, Daenerys asks one of their captured slaves to revive him with blood magic, unwittingly sacrificing their unborn child during the ritual. However, Drogo is left in a catatonic state, unable to move, speak, or lead their horde to Westeros. Heartbroken, Daenerys smothers Drogo and uses his funeral pyre to awaken her dragons. She names her favorite Dragon in his name.

==== Jaqen H'ghar ====
Jaqen H'ghar is an alias used by a member of the Faceless Men, a society of assassins who follow a personification of death known as the Many-Faced God. In A Clash of Kings, this Faceless Man is posing as a Lorathi criminal from the black cells of the Red Keep, given to Yoren's convoy to join the Night's Watch. During the journey, he was locked in a wagon cage along with two other criminals, called Rorge and Biter. He later meets Arya Stark, who frees him and the two others when the group is attacked by Lannister forces commanded by Amory Lorch. In gratitude, he promises to kill any three people Arya names for her. After Arya extorts him by naming him as the third name, Jaqen reluctantly agrees to help her stage a prison riot in Harrenhal that overwhelms the Lannister garrison and frees the northern prisoners. Jaqen offers to take Arya with him to Braavos, but when she demurs, he gives her a Braavosi iron coin and instructs her to say "valar morghulis" to any Braavosi people should she need help finding him. Before leaving her, Jaqen magically changes his face in front of Arya.

Later in A Feast for Crows, an alchemist with features identical to Jaqen's after the face change appears in Oldtown and bribes a Citadel novice named Pate to steal Archmaester Walgrave's keys (which can gain access to any door in the Citadel). After Pate completes the trade, he dies of poison. Pate (with a completely different personality) later appears to greet Samwell Tarly when he meets Archmaester Marwyn.

==== Illyrio Mopatis ====
Illyrio Mopatis is a wealthy and powerful Magister in Pentos. He is overweight, although in his youth he was a strong mercenary. He is a close friend of Varys', and the pair design a plot to place House Targaryen back on the throne of the Seven Kingdoms. Before the events of the series, he welcomed the exiled Viserys Targaryen and his sister Daenerys into his home as guests. In A Game of Thrones, Illyrio brokers a marriage between Daenerys and Khal Drogo to buy Drogo's army of warriors. His plan to create an army to invade Westeros is ruined upon the deaths of Drogo and Viserys. He aids Daenerys in A Clash of Kings by sending her three ships and a disguised Barristan Selmy. He also smuggles Tyrion Lannister out of Westeros in A Dance with Dragons and sends him to accompany Aegon on his journey to aid Daenerys.

==== Hizdahr zo Loraq ====
Hizdahr zo Loraq is a Ghiscari noble of the city of Meereen. With the Sons of the Harpy continuing to cause trouble in the streets, the Green Grace advises Daenerys to take a husband of Ghiscari blood to placate the Meereenese and recommends Hizdahr. After keeping the peace, Hizdahr marries Daenerys as her second husband. Hizdahr tries to gain control of Meereen after the disappearance of Daenerys, but Grey Worm and his Unsullied refuse to obey him.

==== Penny ====
Penny is a dwarf performer. Alongside her brother Oppo, she performed a jousting act, with them riding a dog, Crunch, and a pig, Pretty Pig. They were hired by Petyr Baelish to perform at Joffrey Baratheon's wedding to force a confrontation between him and his uncle, Tyrion Lannister. After the "Purple Wedding", Penny and Oppo flee to Volantis to avoid the consequences. However, sailors mistake Oppo for Tyrion Lannister and murder him, hoping to claim Cersei's offer of a lordship for her brother. Whilst grieving, Penny recognizes Tyrion whilst he and Jorah Mormont visit Volantis, initially attacking him. To prevent her from breaking news of his presence, the two take her with them to Meereen, during which she bonds with Tyrion. Penny is captured and sold alongside Tyrion and Jorah, where they are used as entertainment in the reopened fighting pits in Meereen. After their owner dies of the Pale Mare disease, Penny joins their escape and, though not allowed to join the Second Sons, is allowed to remain in the camp. Whilst there, Tyrion suspects that she may have contracted the disease from their former master.

==== Yezzan zo Qaggaz ====
Yezzan zo Qaggaz is a slave-trader from the city of Yunkai, on the coast of Slaver's Bay, and one of the Wise Masters, the ruling elite of the city. He bought Tyrion Lannister, Penny, and Jorah Mormont from the slavers, and gave them to the charge of his henchman, Nurse. Yezzan was one of the few Yunkai lords who wished to honor the peace between Yunkai and Meereen. He later died of the pale mare that was spreading throughout the Yunkish siege lines, and several of his slaves used the opportunity to escape.

==== Tycho Nestoris ====
Tycho Nestoris is a representative of the Iron Bank of Braavos. Tycho is sent to the Wall to negotiate payment of the debt of the Iron Throne with King Stannis Baratheon. Jon Snow negotiates with him for the use of his ships for a voyage and a loan to purchase food for the winter while the Night's Watch provides him with guides to reach Stannis, who has left Castle Black.

==== Quaithe ====
Quaithe of the Shadow is a shadowbinder from Asshai. She speaks the Common Tongue and wears a dark red lacquer wooden mask to conceal her appearance. She is also one of the three representatives from Qarth who arrive at Vaes Tolorro with Jhogo in search of dragons, the other two being Xaro Xhoan Daxos and the warlock Pyat Pree. Inside Qarth, Quaithe warns Daenerys she must leave. She also warns Daenerys she "must pass beneath the shadow," and she will find truth in Asshai. Later, Quaithe warns Daenerys in her dreams, while she rules Meereen, to embrace her dragon heritage, and warns her of several enemies who will betray her. Daenerys cannot discern whether she is friend or foe.

==== The Waif ====
The Waif is a priestess of the Many-Faced God in the House of Black and White in Braavos. The Waif is assigned to teach Arya the tongue of Braavos and then how to detect lies.

=== Animals ===
==== Direwolves ====
Direwolves are a canine species closely related to wolves but are much larger and stronger. Fully grown direwolves are described as being as large as ponies, with longer legs and larger heads. They are described as being highly intelligent, even fully capable of understanding human speech. Direwolves are thought extinct south of the Wall. However, at the start of the series, Robb Stark and Jon Snow discover six orphaned direwolf pups, whom each of the Stark children adopt. It is heavily implied that the wolves cause each of their owners to develop skinchanging abilities, provided they survive. By A Dance with Dragons, only four of the original six remain: Ghost, Nymeria, Summer and Shaggydog (owned by Jon, Arya, Bran and Rickon, respectively).

- Grey Wind is Robb Stark's male direwolf, named for its swift speed. He accompanies Robb on his campaign against the Lannisters and often fights alongside him in the War of the Five Kings. Upon arrival at the Twins for the Wedding of Robb's uncle Edmure Tully and Roslyn Frey, Grey Wind antagonizes the Frey envoys, leading to his being locked up in the kennels. During the Red Wedding, Grey Wind is released by Raynald Westerling, and he fights against the attacking Freys, including the kennelmaster. However, he is eventually killed by crossbows, while his savior falls into the Green Fork trying to escape. As a mockery of their relationship, the Freys sew Grey Wind's head onto Robb's mutilated body.
- Ghost is Jon Snow's male direwolf, named due to it being albino and its silent nature. Ghost is born the runt of the litter but later grows into the largest of the six Stark direwolves. He accompanies Jon to Castle Black and assists him during his time at the Night's Watch. Jon Snow regularly wargs into Ghost's body during sleep and is capable of sensing the status of the other sibling direwolves. After behaving aggressively towards several men of the Night's Watch, including Bowen Marsh and a wildling skinchanger, Jon has Ghost locked up in his quarters. However, Ghost's instincts prove to be correct, as Marsh leads a mutiny against Jon.
- Lady is Sansa Stark's female direwolf, named because it was the smallest and prettiest of the pups. After an incident on the Kingsroad when Nymeria bites Joffrey, Cersei demands that Lady be killed in her place when they cannot find her littermate. Despite his objections, Ned Stark obeys the king's order but kills Lady personally. Rather than let Cersei have her skin, he sends men to bring her body back north.
- Nymeria is Arya Stark's female direwolf, named after a legendary Rhoynish warrior queen whom she admires. After she attacks Joffrey during a fight, Arya is forced to chase her away to avoid Cersei's wrath. Taking refuge in the Riverlands, Nymeria gathers together a large wolf pack, attacking both humans and livestock. Arya frequently wargs into Nymeria's body during sleep, even during her training in Braavos. Her "wolf dreams" are instrumental in the resurrection of her mother Catelyn into Lady Stoneheart after the Red Wedding, and essential for her not losing the Stark identity while training to be a Faceless Men assassin.
- Summer is Bran Stark's male direwolf. After his owner's fall from the Old Keep, Summer remains outside his window howling and, during an assassination attempt, kills the attacker sent. Through Summer, Bran learns about his skinchanging abilities. On his journey to find the "Three Eyed Crow", he uses Summer to scout ahead and hunt.
- Shaggydog is Rickon Stark's male direwolf and is the only black one and the most temperamental of all the direwolf pups. Jojen Reed describes him as "full of fear and rage". Shaggydog follows Rickon and Osha to the island of Skagos, which is infamously rumored to be inhabited by cannibals. When Jon Snow wargs into his direwolf Ghost during sleep, he once sees Shaggydog fighting and killing a goat with one long horn.

==== Dragons ====
- Drogon, a black dragon, is visibly the largest and Daenerys's favourite dragon. Drogon is named after Khal Drogo, her late husband. After Drogon and Dany escaped from Meereen, they lived in a cave on an isolated hill in the Dothraki Sea; she named it Dragonstone, after the Dragonstone in Westeros. There, she lived off his kills, wild vegetation, and stream water. There, Khal Jhaqo and his new breakaway khalasar came across them.
- Rhaegal is named after Daenerys's deceased brother, Rhaegar Targaryen, and is green.
- Viserion is named after Daenerys's deceased brother, Viserys Targaryen, and is yellow.
  - When Daenerys lost control over them, she locked Rhaegal and Viserion in the catacombs beneath Meereen. Drogon broke out of Meereen and followed Daenerys.
