= Viserys Targaryen =

Viserys Targaryen is the name of two Kings and one prince from the fictional House Targaryen in A Song of Ice and Fire and works based on it:

- Viserys I Targaryen, a character in the novels The Princess and the Queen, Fire & Blood and the television series House of the Dragon.
- Viserys II Targaryen, a character in The Princess and the Queen, Fire & Blood and the TV adaptation House of the Dragon under the title Prince Viserys.
- Viserys III Targaryen, a character in the novel A Game of Thrones and season 1 of the television series Game of Thrones.

== See also ==
- List of A Song of Ice and Fire characters
- List of Game of Thrones characters
