= Red in the Face =

- Mad Men episode
- Episode no.: Season 1 Episode 7
- Directed by: Tim Hunter
- Written by: Bridget Bedard
- Original air date: August 30, 2007
- Running time: 47 minutes

Guest appearances
- John Slattery as Roger Sterling; Robert Morse as Bert Cooper; Anne Dudek as Francine Hanson; Kate Norby as Carol McCardy; Shayna Rose as Rosemary; Teddy Sears as Kicks Matherton; Darby Stanchfield as Helen Bishop; Andy Umberger as Dr. Arnold Wayne

Episode chronology
← Previous "Babylon"	Next → "The Hobo Code"
- Mad Men season 1

"Red in the Face" is the seventh episode of the first season of the American television drama series Mad Men. It was written by Bridget Bedard and directed by Tim Hunter. The episode originally aired on the AMC channel in the United States on August 30, 2007.

== Plot ==
Roger's wife and daughter are out of town and he tries to go away with Joan, but she has plans with her roommate, Carol. Peggy works on copy for Belle Jolie, which shocks Pete, because she is working on a high-profile account. He offers to take a look at her copy, claiming copywriters regularly have him do it. Flattered, she agrees.

Roger, feeling lonely, insists Don go drinking with him. Roger muses women lose their glow when they turn 30 and discovers young women beside them are not looking at him, but at Don. Roger invites himself to dinner with Don and Betty, with Betty skipping her entrée so Roger can eat it. After dinner, Roger drunkenly makes a move on Betty when Don leaves the room. After Don returns, Roger leaves; Don angrily reacts and says she was leading Roger on. Don calls her "a little girl", echoing Betty's therapist, who has been sharing everything said in her sessions with Don. The next day, Roger attempts to apologize to Don, but Don feigns ignorance.

Meanwhile, Pete attempts to return a "chip-and-dip" that he and Trudy received as a wedding present. At the store, he is upset when he is unable to charm the store employees into giving him a cash refund and uses his store credit to purchase a rifle. Later, it is revealed that Trudy did not want him to return the chip-and-dip and is furious that he did so. The next day, Pete brings the rifle to work and shows it to Peggy. He tells her about a fantasy he has in which he uses the rifle to kill a deer, then drag it to a cabin in the woods where a woman cooks it for his dinner and watches him eat it.

Betty runs into Helen at the supermarket, who angrily confronts Betty about the lock of hair she gave to Glen, telling her it was inappropriate. Betty responds by slapping her in the face. Later, Francine and the other housewives agree to shun Helen. Meanwhile, Don takes Roger to lunch to prepare for a meeting with Richard Nixon's presidential campaign. Before they leave the office, Don bribes an elevator attendant. At lunch, Don pushes Roger to eat and drink. When they return, the attendant tells them the elevator is out of service, so they must walk twenty-three flights of stairs to the office. Roger becomes exhausted and vomits in front of the Nixon officials. Don asks if Roger is okay, then walks away smirking to himself.

== First appearances ==
- Carol McCardy: Joan's roommate and college friend who works as a library receptionist.

== Reception ==
The episode was received positively by critics. Alan Sepinwall, writing for New Jersey's The Star-Ledger, wrote that the episode captured the generational divide of the era. Andrew Johnston, writing for Slant Magazine, praised the episode's sense of humor. Emily VanDerWerff of The A.V. Club graded it an "A" (the highest possible), praising its "audacious character writing."
