= Mad Men season 1 =

Season of television series

Mad Men
- Season 1
- Season 1 promotional poster
- Starring: Jon Hamm; Elisabeth Moss; Vincent Kartheiser; January Jones; Christina Hendricks; Bryan Batt; Michael Gladis; Aaron Staton; Rich Sommer; Maggie Siff
- No. of episodes: 13

Release
- Original network: AMC
- Original release: July 19 – October 18, 2007

Season chronology
- Next → Season 2

The first season of the American television drama series Mad Men premiered on July 19, 2007, and ended on October 18, 2007. It consisted of thirteen episodes, each running approximately 47 minutes. AMC broadcast the first season on Thursdays at 10:00 pm in the United States. Actors Jon Hamm, Elisabeth Moss, Vincent Kartheiser, January Jones, Christina Hendricks, Bryan Batt, Michael Gladis, Aaron Staton, and Rich Sommer receive main cast billing.

Season one takes place between March and November 1960. It introduces the fictional advertising agency Sterling Cooper. The season begins with the new secretary, Peggy Olson, starting her first day with the firm. As the season unfolds, the mysterious backstory of enigmatic ad man Don Draper is revealed as is the growing confidence and success of Peggy Olson.

The first season was highly commended for its excellence in writing, acting, and art design, as well as for its faithfulness to the era it depicted. It was acknowledged with numerous honors from industry awards, including the Primetime Emmy Award for Outstanding Drama Series, the Golden Globe Award for Best Drama Series, and a Peabody Award. According to Metacritic's annual aggregate of year-end lists that detailed the best TV shows of 2007 as determined by significant entertainment publications and critics, Mad Men's first season received the most mentions of any show and also received the most first-place votes.

== Cast ==
=== Main cast ===
- Jon Hamm as Don Draper
- Elisabeth Moss as Peggy Olson
- Vincent Kartheiser as Pete Campbell
- January Jones as Betty Draper
- Christina Hendricks as Joan Holloway
- Bryan Batt as Salvatore Romano
- Michael Gladis as Paul Kinsey
- Aaron Staton as Ken Cosgrove
- Rich Sommer as Harry Crane
- Maggie Siff as Rachel Menken

=== Recurring cast ===
- Kiernan Shipka as Sally Draper
- John Slattery as Roger Sterling
- Robert Morse as Bert Cooper
- Julie McNiven as Hildy
- Alison Brie as Trudy Campbell
- Anne Dudek as Francine Hanson
- Rosemarie DeWitt as Midge Daniels
- Andy Umberger as Arnold Wayne
- Stephanie Courtney as Marge
- Alexa Alemanni as Allison
- Talia Balsam as Mona Sterling
- Darby Stanchfield as Helen Bishop
- Marten Holden Weiner as Glen Bishop
- Joel Murray as Freddy Rumsen
- John Cullum as Lee Garner, Sr.
- Mark Moses as Herman "Duck" Phillips
- Kate Norby as Carol McCardy
- Joe O'Connor as Tom Vogel
- Jay Paulson as Adam Whitman
- Elizabeth Rice as Margaret Sterling

=== Guest stars ===
- Deborah Lacey as Carla
- Darren Pettie as Lee Garner, Jr.

== Plot ==
The first season opens in March 1960, as genius advertising executive Donald "Don" Draper meets Peggy Olson, his new secretary. They both work at the small but prestigious agency Sterling Cooper; the agency has begun working for the 1960 Richard Nixon presidential campaign, gratis and unbidden, as they believe Nixon's success against John F. Kennedy will benefit their business. They are also working to reassure their largest client, Lucky Strike, in the face of resurgent medical research demonstrating smoking is harmful. Don has trouble balancing his life as he cheats on his wife, Betty Draper, with a beatnik artist named Midge Daniels. He later begins a flirtatious relationship with Rachel Menken, the Jewish owner of a department store who seeks marketing help at Sterling Cooper.

Following the death of her mother, Betty begins seeing a psychiatrist, and Don secretly has Betty's doctor report back to him what Betty says in treatment. He is also forced to deal with the arrival of his younger brother, Adam Whitman, who refers to Don as "Dick Whitman"; Don gives Adam $5,000 and tells him to make a new life for himself, and to never contact him again. Meanwhile, Peggy is subject to passive-aggressive hostility from office manager Joan Holloway, as well as sexual harassment from her male colleagues. Junior accounts manager Pete Campbell, who is about to get married, takes a liking to Peggy and the two have sex the night of his bachelor party. Peggy begins writing copy after ad man Freddy Rumsen recognizes her talent; she is soon given control of her own account, creating a campaign for a weight loss machine.

Roger Sterling, the acerbic son of one of Sterling Cooper's founding partners, cheats on his wife, Mona, with Joan. He later suffers two heart attacks, drastically changing his outlook on life, and prompting Lucky Strike's owner, Lee Garner, Sr., to warn the agency's senior partner Bert Cooper that keeping Lucky Strike's account requires Sterling Cooper to do something to "show Don Sterling Cooper appreciates him". Bert then offers Don a partnership, with a 12% share of the business. Don accepts and decides to appoint a new head of accounts to lighten Roger's load. The most promising candidate proves to be Herman "Duck" Phillips, who is looking for a job after alcoholism and an extramarital affair ended his career at Y&R's London office. After the partners leave for the day, the Sterling Cooper ad men throw a raucous party the night of the 1960 presidential election, but see their client and preferred choice, Nixon, defeated by Kennedy.

Throughout the season, flashbacks to Don's early life as "Dick Whitman" depict his relationships with his unloving, pious stepmother, who calls him a "whore-child", and abusive father Archibald Whitman, who cheats a hobo out of promised payment for performing chores. In the Korean War, Dick is put under the command of Lieutenant Donald Draper, who is soon to be sent home. After an attack, an accidental explosion kills Draper; Whitman switches dog tags with his lieutenant and assumes Draper's identity as a way to escape the war. The Army has "Draper" take Whitman's body back to Whitman's family. The coffin is dropped off by train; Whitman does not exit to greet his family, but a young Adam sees him standing inside the train.

Pete, who has demonstrated a propensity to snoop, expresses the belief that he should be promoted to head of accounts. While sitting in Don's office, the mailroom boy mistakes Pete for Don and delivers a package from Adam Whitman filled with Dick Whitman's dog tags and childhood photographs. Pete uses the information to blackmail Don into giving him a promotion. Don neutralizes the threat by telling Bert that he has hired Duck Phillips, knowing it would incite Pete to reveal Don's true identity to Bert. Bert chooses not to believe Pete and gives Don the option to either fire Pete or keep a close eye on him, as "one never knows how loyalty is born." Meanwhile, Peggy seeks medical care for severe stomach pains and discovers that she has experienced a cryptic pregnancy, with Pete being the baby's father.

The season ends just before Thanksgiving 1960, as Betty and Don bicker over Don's lack of interest in attending Thanksgiving dinner with Betty's family. Soon afterwards, Betty discovers that Don has been receiving calls from her psychiatrist. Don is devastated to learn that Adam has hanged himself, and he subsequently makes a new campaign presentation for the Kodak Carousel that revolves around the "power of nostalgia". On the train ride home, Don has a vision of returning home to announce he will be joining the family for Thanksgiving. Instead, Don returns home to find the house dark and empty; he sits alone at the bottom of the staircase as the season closes.

== Episodes ==
No. overall	No. in season	Title	Directed by	Written by	Original release date	US viewers (millions)
1	1	"Smoke Gets in Your Eyes"	Alan Taylor	Matthew Weiner	July 19, 2007	1.65
In March 1960, Don Draper, a high-level advertising executive at the Sterling Cooper agency in New York City, struggles to find ideas to keep an account for Lucky Strike cigarettes, in light of the growing public awareness of the dangers of smoking. He seeks input from customers and his girlfriend Midge, but is unable to find a solution. Meanwhile, Peggy Olson finds employment as Don's new secretary but struggles to fit in; her supervisor, Joan Holloway, advises Peggy on how to appeal to men for success in her personal career. Junior accounts manager Pete Campbell, who is getting married, takes a liking to Peggy and pursues her sexually. Don and his superior Roger Sterling meet with Rachel Menken for a consultation on her department store. Don storms out of the meeting when Rachel disagrees with his pitch, but Roger asks him to reconcile with Rachel, as she is worth $3 million. Don makes amends with Rachel, who remarks that she understands what it is to be an outsider, and agrees to come back to Sterling Cooper for another meeting. Don takes a train to a suburban home, where it is revealed that he has a wife and two children.
2	2	"Ladies Room"	Alan Taylor	Matthew Weiner	July 26, 2007	1.04
Don continues to conceal his increasingly complicated personal life, even in the face of Roger's invitation to open up. The members of Sterling Cooper's creative team are puzzled when contemplating the question of "what women want". Peggy pines for Pete, who is still on his honeymoon, while fending off the advances of several of the men of Sterling Cooper. She expresses annoyance at being targeted by the sexually predatory males in the office, but Joan advises her to "enjoy it while it lasts." Don's wife, Betty, has periodically experienced numb and shaking hands since her mother's recent death. After getting into a car accident, Betty's physicians suggest she visit a psychiatrist. Don is resistant, proclaiming that therapy is for people who are unhappy, but eventually allows Betty to seek help. Following Betty's first therapy session, Don secretly makes a phone call to her therapist Dr. Wayne, who consults his notes from Betty's session over the phone.
3	3	"Marriage of Figaro"	Ed Bianchi	Tom Palmer	August 2, 2007	1.07
Don is recognized by a man on the train who refers to him as Dick Whitman; Don acknowledges the man and makes non-committal plans about getting together. Pete returns from his honeymoon, excited about his new marriage but conflicted about his past encounter with Peggy, who reassures him that their dalliance never occurred. Don meets with Rachel at her family's department store, during which he kisses her impulsively and admits that he is married. In response, Rachel tells Don that she wants someone else put in charge of her account at Sterling Cooper. Don and Betty host a birthday party for their daughter, Sally; Betty invites her neighbor, Helen Bishop, who is treated like an outcast due to her failed marriage. Don abruptly leaves the party and returns later that night with a Golden Retriever for Sally, recalling Rachel's earlier conversation about how a dog can be everything to a little girl.
4	4	"New Amsterdam"	Tim Hunter	Lisa Albert	August 9, 2007	0.85
Pete faces pressure from his wife, Trudy, regarding an expensive new apartment. Over drinks with his wealthy parents, Pete asks for a down payment from his father, but is rejected. Trudy later goes against Pete's wishes and asks her own father for the money, who proudly agrees. Betty begins a tentative friendship with Helen and babysits her son Glen. Glen develops a crush on Betty and asks for a piece of her hair; Betty is apprehensive, but eventually cuts off a small lock and gives it to him. Pete, Don, and art director Sal Romano meet with a prospective client, Bethlehem Steel, to pitch a new idea. Pete organizes a late meeting with Bethlehem Steel, during which he pitches his own advertising idea without the knowledge of anyone else in the office. Don is enraged and fires Pete, but the company's senior partner Bert Cooper asks Don to retain Pete because of his family's extensive connections. Don and Roger later confront Pete; putting on a show, Roger claims that he and Bert wanted him fired, but Don fought for Pete to have a second chance.
5	5	"5G"	Lesli Linka Glatter	Matthew Weiner	August 16, 2007	0.75
Don wins an industry award for his advertising work, attracting the attention of a man named Adam Whitman, who shows up at Sterling Cooper and confronts Don, recognizing him as his older brother Dick. While meeting at a diner with Adam, Don admits that he has changed his name, but refuses to share any information about himself, coldly stating that he has no place for Adam in his life. Meanwhile, Peggy learns the existence of Midge and tells Joan, who advises her how to handle the situation. Pete becomes jealous when Ken Cosgrove gets a short story published in The Atlantic Monthly, and pressures Trudy into visiting her ex-boyfriend Charlie to convince him to publish a story that Pete has written; Charlie only agrees to publish Pete's story in Boys' Life when Trudy rejects his advances. Don meets with Adam again and offers him $5,000 to leave New York and never contact him again, explaining that he has too much to lose by revealing his past. Distraught, Adam embraces him before Don leaves.
6	6	"Babylon"	Andrew Bernstein	Andre Jacquemetton & Maria Jacquemetton	August 23, 2007	0.81
While preparing breakfast for Betty on Mother's Day, Don trips down the stairs and experiences a brief vision of himself as a child, meeting Adam for the first time. While discussing marketing strategies with the Israeli Board of Tourism, Don decides to meet with Rachel, under the guise of asking her for input because she is Jewish. Rachel keeps their meeting professional, but later confesses to her sister that she is developing feelings for Don. Roger is pursuing a romantic affair with Joan, who rejects his suggestion that she get her own apartment, suspecting that Roger will eventually leave her for someone younger. Don drops by Midge's apartment, but they are interrupted by her beatnik friend Roy, who antagonizes Don's age and career. Peggy helps brainstorm ideas for Freddy Rumsen, who is working on a campaign for Belle Jolie lipstick. Impressed, Freddy relays Peggy's suggestions to the rest of the creative team, and asks Peggy to write some copy for the account.
7	7	"Red in the Face"	Tim Hunter	Bridget Bedard	August 30, 2007	1.02
Pete is surprised to learn that Peggy is working on a copy for Belle Jolie. While attempting to return a wedding present, Pete feels emasculated when he is unable to charm the store employees into giving him a cash refund, and instead uses his store credit to purchase a rifle, which he shows off to Peggy. Helen angrily confronts Betty about the lock of hair she gave to Glen, causing Betty to slap her. Roger, feeling lonely, invites himself to dinner with the Drapers and drunkenly makes a move on Betty. Don accuses Betty of leading Roger on by being talkative at dinner and calls her "a little girl", purposely echoing the comments that Dr. Wayne has shared with him. Don plots revenge against Roger by bribing an elevator attendant and encouraging Roger to eat and drink before a meeting with officials from Richard Nixon's presidential campaign. When they return to the office, the attendant tells them the elevator is out of service, forcing them to walk the twenty-three flights of stairs; Roger becomes exhausted and vomits in front of the Nixon officials.
8	8	"The Hobo Code"	Phil Abraham	Chris Provenzano	September 6, 2007	0.85
Peggy, nervous about her upcoming Belle Jolie meeting, is seduced by Pete, and they have sex on an office sofa. Don presents Peggy's campaign ideas to the executives from Belle Jolie, who accept the pitch; Peggy is invited to have a drink with the creative team to celebrate. At Peggy's celebration, Pete acts coldly towards Peggy and walks out, leaving her hurt. Meanwhile, Sal meets up with Belle Jolie executive Elliott at a restaurant; the two men connect, but Sal is reluctant to accept Elliott's invite to his hotel room, too afraid to follow through on his attraction to men. While getting high with Midge and her beatnik friends, Don experiences a flashback to his childhood. He recalls a hobo approaching Don's family for food in exchange for work; Don's father, Archie, tells the man that he will get paid the next day. The next day, Archie refuses to compensate the man as promised, and Don discovers the hobo has carved the symbol for "a dishonest man" into the fence post of their home. Back to the present, Don decides to end his affair with Midge, realizing that she and Roy are in love.
9	9	"Shoot"	Paul Feig	Chris Provenzano and Matthew Weiner	September 13, 2007	0.84
Don and Betty run into Jim Hobart, the head of rival advertising agency McCann Erickson; Jim offers a job to Don and gives his business card to Betty, telling her that she would be a perfect model for their Coca-Cola campaign. Betty is excited to return to modelling, but Don is ambivalent to the idea. While discussing how to assist with Nixon's presidential campaign, Pete suggests buying up ad space in swing states for Secor Laxatives, preventing Nixon's rival John F. Kennedy from running competing ads. Joan tries to give Peggy advice about losing weight; Peggy tells her that she is more interested in being a writer than attracting men, confusing Joan. Pete punches Ken when he makes a rude comment about Peggy's weight. Upon receiving photos of Betty's shoot, Don decides to reject Jim's job offer and instead negotiates a higher salary with Roger. After Don calls Jim to decline the offer, Jim fires Betty, who is distraught by the news. However, Betty does not tell Don that she was let go, instead telling him that she didn't like the idea of not being home enough.
10	10	"Long Weekend"	Tim Hunter	Bridget Bedard and Andre Jacquemetton & Maria Jacquemetton and Matthew Weiner	September 27, 2007	0.61
Stuck in the city for Labor Day weekend, Roger tries to convince Joan to spend the evening with him, but she rejects him in favor of spending the weekend with her roommate Carol, who has recently been fired from her publishing job. As they prepare to go out, Carol reveals romantic feelings for Joan, who remains neutral and impassive. Pete informs Don that one of his accounts, Dr. Scholl's, is leaving for another agency, dissatisfied with the firm's creative talent. Roger, still looking for companionship, offers to help take Don's mind off the lost client by attending an advertisement casting call; Roger ends up meeting and propositioning a pair of young twins. At the office, Roger suffers a major heart attack while attempting to have sex with one of the girls; he survives, but is hospitalized. Joan is notified of Roger's heart attack by Bert and is asked to write emergency telegrams for their clients. Noticing her tears, Bert tells her that she can do better. Meanwhile, Don is shaken by Roger's heart attack and visits Rachel, seeking a sexual encounter.
11	11	"Indian Summer"	Tim Hunter	Tom Palmer and Matthew Weiner	October 4, 2007	0.68
Adam hangs himself in his hotel room after mailing a personal box to Don. In the wake of his heart attack, Roger returns to Sterling Cooper, but suffers a second heart attack during a meeting with the head of Lucky Strike, Lee Garner, Sr. As a result, Don is given a partnership in Sterling Cooper, making Pete jealous. Peggy is asked to write copy for a weight-loss device that vibrates, and discovers that it provides sexual stimulation; Don is impressed by Peggy's presentation and gives her a raise and a day off. Don and Rachel continue their affair, while Betty becomes increasingly sexually frustrated as Don's focus remains elsewhere. After receiving a visit from an air conditioning salesman who tours the house, Betty finds that she is sexually stimulated by the vibrations of her washing machine, and has a vision of sex with the salesman. Don calls Dr. Wayne to discuss Betty's progress, and Dr. Wayne suggests moving her towards psychoanalysis. While sitting in Don's office at the end of the day, Pete gets mistaken for Don and is given Adam's package by a mailboy.
12	12	"Nixon vs. Kennedy"	Alan Taylor	Lisa Albert & Andre Jacquemetton & Maria Jacquemetton	October 11, 2007	0.80
On November 8, 1960, Sterling Cooper's employees have an all-night office party to watch the United States presidential election results, hoping for Nixon to win against Kennedy. When Don is unwilling to promote him to head of accounts, Pete searches through Adam's package for Don; he discovers that Don's real name is Dick Whitman, and that Whitman died in the Korean War in 1950. Pete approaches Don with the box and attempts to blackmail Don into giving him the job. Don is distressed upon viewing the box's contents and visits Rachel, attempting to convince her to run away with him, but she ends their affair. The next day, Don tells Pete that the external candidate Duck Phillips will become the new head of accounts, leading Pete to tell Bert about Don's real identity; Bert chooses not to believe Pete and orders Don to fire him or to have Pete show his loyalty. Don chooses the latter and remembers his past in the Korean War–including the accidental death of Lt. Donald Draper in 1950 and his switching identities with the lieutenant to escape his own grotesque past. The episode ends with Don coming home and watching Nixon's concession speech.
13	13	"The Wheel"	Matthew Weiner	Matthew Weiner and Robin Veith	October 18, 2007	0.93
Pete brings in a pharmaceutical account from his father-in-law's company called Clearasil, but Don gets revenge against Pete by promoting Peggy as junior copywriter and asking her to write a copy for the Clearasil account. After experiencing stomach pains, Peggy goes to the hospital and discovers that she has experienced a cryptic pregnancy, with Pete being the baby's father; she gives birth to a baby boy, but refuses to acknowledge him. While preparing for Thanksgiving, Betty discovers her friend Francine's husband has been having an affair, leading her to re-evaluate her own marriage. Betty later investigates Don's phone calls and is stunned to discover that Don has been consulting with Dr. Wayne. After looking through old pictures from Adam's box, Don calls the hotel to get forwarding information on Adam, only to learn of Adam's suicide. Emotional about his brother's death, Don pitches an ad campaign for carousel slide projectors to Eastman Kodak about nostalgia; the Kodak clients are impressed and cancel their meetings with other agencies. On his ride back home, Don imagines seeing Betty and the kids for Thanksgiving dinner, only to discover that the house is actually empty.

== Production ==
=== Filming ===
The pilot episode began filming on April 20, 2006, and was shot at Silvercup Studios and various locations around New York City; subsequent episodes have been filmed at Los Angeles Center Studios. It is available in high definition for showing on AMC-HD and on video-on-demand services available from various cable affiliates. The writers, including Weiner, amassed volumes of research on the period in which Mad Men takes place so as to make most aspects of the series—including detailed set designs, costume design, and props—historically accurate, producing an authentic visual style that garnered critical praise. Each episode has a budget of $2–2.5 million, though the pilot episode's budget was over $3 million. On the scenes featuring smoking, Weiner stated: "Doing this show without smoking would've been a joke. It would've been sanitary and it would've been phony." Since the actors cannot, by California law, smoke tobacco cigarettes in their workplace, they instead smoke herbal cigarettes.

=== Crew ===
In addition to having created the series, Matthew Weiner is the showrunner, head writer, and an executive producer; he contributes to each episode—writing or co-writing the scripts, casting various roles, and approving costume and set designs. He is notorious for being selective about all aspects of the series, and promotes a high level of secrecy around production details.

Along with Matthew Weiner, the writing staff of the first season consisted of co-executive producer Tom Palmer, who wrote two episodes; producer Lisa Albert, who wrote two episodes; producers and writing team Andre and Maria Jacquemetton, who wrote three episodes; writer's assistant Robin Veith, who wrote two episodes; and freelance writers Bridget Bedard and Chris Provenzano, who each wrote two episodes. Other producers included co-producer Blake McCormick, producer Todd London, and co-executive producer Scott Hornbacher. Primary directors of the first season were Tim Hunter, who directed four episodes, and Alan Taylor, who directed three including the pilot episode. The remaining episodes were directed by Ed Bianchi, Lesli Linka Glatter, Andrew Bernstein, series cinematographer Phil Abraham, Paul Feig, and series creator Matthew Weiner, who directs each season finale.

== Reception ==
=== Ratings ===
The premiere episode, which aired at 10:00 p.m. on July 19, 2007, was rated higher than any other AMC original series at the time, and attained a 1.4 household rating (1.2 million households). The season averaged 900,000 viewers.

=== Critical reception ===
The first season of Mad Men received acclaim from critics. Review aggregator Rotten Tomatoes reports that 85% of 41 critics have given the season a positive review with an average score of 9.2/10. The site's consensus is: "Oozing evocative early 1960s ambiance, Mad Men is a sly, subversive look at the American workplace that radiates class, wit, and an undercurrent of disaffection." On Metacritic, the first season scored 77 out of 100 based on 32 reviews, indicating generally favorable reviews.

Tim Goodman of The Hollywood Reporter said each episode "unfolded like a small movie", calling it "one of the best character studies anyone has put on television in some time – an adult drama of introspection and the inconvenience of modernity in a man's world." Robert Bianco of USA Today said the show "hopes to come to grips with both what was lost and what has been gained since generation gaps, sexual revolutions, racial divides and Vietnam blasted the '60s apart" and called it a "smart, complex drama". The New York Times called it "both a drama and a comedy and all the better for it, a series that breaks new ground by luxuriating in the not-so-distant past." DVD Talk writer Adam Tyner described the season as "virtually flawless", praising the depth with which each of the characters has been written. Andrew Johnson praised the initial episode in Time Out New York stating: "Inspired by cynical Eisenhower-era comedies of manners (Sweet Smell of Success, The Apartment) and the stories of John Cheever, frequent Sopranos writer Matthew Weiner's Mad Men is a scathing chronicle of the ad industry’s boozy midcentury heyday, and one of the freshest series to hit basic cable in years."

Variety's reaction to the first season was more mixed, commenting that "as a serialized drama, the program's situations aren't especially stirring, even with its solid, perfectly outfitted cast. The sheer atmosphere, however, proves intoxicating." Tom Shales of The Washington Post wrote a negative review, stating that "the stories unfold in a dry, drab way and the pacing is desultory. Series directors are fond of long pauses that serve no purpose other than to give the impression that an actor forgot his next line."

=== Accolades ===
The first season of Mad Men was nominated for and won numerous industry awards, including fifteen Emmy nominations and six Emmy wins. At the 60th Primetime Emmy Awards, Mad Men won Outstanding Drama Series and Outstanding Writing in a Drama Series (Matthew Weiner for "Smoke Gets in Your Eyes"). The series also won Creative Arts Emmys for Art Direction, Cinematography, Hairstyling, and Main Title Design.

The series also received nominations for Outstanding Lead Actor in a Drama Series (Jon Hamm), Outstanding Supporting Actor in a Drama Series (John Slattery), Outstanding Guest Actor in a Drama Series (Robert Morse), Outstanding Directing in a Drama Series (Alan Taylor), again for "Smoke Gets in Your Eyes") and a second nomination for Outstanding Writing in a Drama Series (Weiner and Robin Veith, for "The Wheel").

Mad Men won a Peabody Award for Outstanding Achievement in Television for the first season in 2007. AMC Executive Vice President Charles Collier called the award an "incredible honor". The first season was also honored by the American Film Institute as one of the ten greatest television achievements of 2007, called it brilliant for depicting "the discomfort that hides in the dark corners of nostalgia", and said "The show's extraordinary writing, characterizations and art direction neatly package a time filtered through the haze of cigarettes and sexism, but the message is for today — that those who sell a way of life are often mad for a world that is not their own."

The series won Best Television Drama Series at the 65th Golden Globe Awards, while Jon Hamm won Best Actor – Television Series Drama. "Smoke Gets in Your Eyes" also won a Casting Society of America Artios Award for Outstanding Casting in a Television Pilot, Drama. Alan Taylor won a 2007 Directors Guild of America Award for Drama Series directing "Smoke Gets in Your Eyes". The series also won 2007 Writers Guild Awards for Best Dramatic Series and Best New Series. Chris Provenzano for "The Hobo Code" was nominated for the Episode Drama award, but lost to The Sopranos episode, "The Second Coming".

The first season was also honored by the Television Critics Association Awards, winning Program of the Year, Outstanding Achievement in Drama, and Outstanding New Program of the Year. Jon Hamm was also nominated for Individual Achievement in Drama at the 24th TCA Awards.

Jon Hamm and the cast Mad Men were also nominated at the 14th Screen Actors Guild Awards for Outstanding Performance by a Male Actor in a Drama Series and Outstanding Performance by an Ensemble in a Drama Series but lost to James Gandolfini and the cast of The Sopranos, respectively.

== Home media release ==
The first season was released on DVD and Blu-ray in region 1 on July 1, 2008. In addition to the thirteen episodes, the discs include 26 audio commentaries by cast and crew, and featurettes regarding the production of the series and mini-documentaries on media culture and the historical time in which the story is set. Featurettes include "Establishing Mad Men", "Advertising the American Dream", and "Scoring Mad Men". Also included is a music sampler for music from the show, a photo gallery, and a season two preview.
