= Long Weekend (Mad Men) =

- Mad Men episode
- Episode no.: Season 1 Episode 10
- Directed by: Tim Hunter
- Written by: Bridget Bedard; Andre Jacquemetton; Maria Jacquemetton; Matthew Weiner
- Original air date: September 27, 2007
- Running time: 47 minutes

Guest appearances
- Allan Miller as Abraham Menken; John Slattery as Roger Sterling; Robert Morse as Bert Cooper; Talia Balsam as Mona Sterling; Kate Norby as Carol McCardy; Ryan Cutrona as Gene Hofstadt; Elizabeth Rice as Margaret Sterling; Alexis Stier as Mirabelle Ames; Megan Stier as Eleanor Ames; John Walcott as Franklin Newcomb

Episode chronology
← Previous "Shoot"	Next → "Indian Summer"
- Mad Men season 1

"Long Weekend" is the tenth episode of the first season of the American television drama series Mad Men. It was written by Bridget Bedard, Andre Jacquemetton, Maria Jacquemetton and series creator Matthew Weiner. The episode was directed by Tim Hunter. It originally aired on the AMC channel in the United States on September 27, 2007.

== Plot ==
Betty's father, Gene, comes to visit for Labor Day. Since his wife's death, Gene has begun seeing Gloria, whom Betty dislikes. As tensions increase, the three of them leave for a weekend trip away, with Don promising to join them the following day.

Pete informs Don that one of his accounts, Dr. Scholl's, is leaving for another agency because of their dissatisfaction with their account's creative direction. Roger tries to convince Joan to spend the evening with him while his wife and daughter are away for Labor Day, but she rejects him in favor of going out with her roommate, Carol McCardy. Carol is distressed because she was fired from her publishing job when she was made the scapegoat for her boss's mistake. Joan and Carol bond over their anger at being used by men.

Roger, still looking for companionship, offers to help take Don's mind off Dr. Scholl's. They meet a pair of young twins at a Sterling Cooper audition for aluminum cladding, and Roger invites them upstairs for drinks. That night, Roger propositions both girls, while Don seems uninterested. Later, Roger suffers a major heart attack while attempting to have sex with one of the girls. He survives, but is hospitalized and cries as his wife and daughter visit.

Meanwhile, Carol tells Joan she loves her: Joan remains neutral and impassive. Joan and Carol initiate sex with two men they meet at a bar, but Joan is called into the office by Bert to write telegrams to their clients insisting no changes to the agency's business, despite Roger's health. He also implies knowledge of Joan and Roger's affair. Meanwhile, Don is shaken by Roger's heart attack and calls Betty, but then visits Rachel and they have sex. He confides to her that his mother was a prostitute who died during his birth, and that his father and adoptive parents were neglectful.

== First appearances ==
- Gloria Massey: Eugene Hofstadt's new girlfriend, whom Betty despises.
- Eugene "Gene" Hofstadt: Betty's elderly father and Don's father-in-law.

== Final appearances ==
- Carol McCardy: Joan's closeted roommate and college friend who works at a literary agency and has a crush on her.

== Reception ==
The episode was received positively by critics at the time. Alan Sepinwall, writing for New Jersey's The Star-Ledger, praised the episode, saying that it and the show itself were "dense and layered" and "deserving of deeper analysis". Emily St. James, writing for The A.V. Club in 2014, was more critical of the episode, writing that it was "one of Mad Men's clunkier episodes" but still praising some aspects, including John Slattery's performance as Roger.
