= New Amsterdam (Mad Men) =

- Mad Men episode
- Episode no.: Season 1 Episode 4
- Directed by: Tim Hunter
- Written by: Lisa Albert
- Original air date: August 9, 2007
- Running time: 46 minutes

Guest appearances
- Robert Morse as Bert Cooper; John Slattery as Roger Sterling; Alison Brie as Trudy Campbell; Christopher Allport as Andrew Campbell; Darby Stanchfield as Helen Bishop; Andy Umberger as Dr. Arnold Wayne; Randy Oglesby as Walter Veith; Joe O'Connor as Tom Vogel

Episode chronology
← Previous "Marriage of Figaro"	Next → "5G"
- Mad Men season 1

"New Amsterdam" is the fourth episode of the first season of the American television drama series Mad Men. It was written by Lisa Albert and directed by Tim Hunter. The episode originally aired on the AMC channel in the United States on August 9, 2007.

== Plot ==
Pete's wife Trudy arrives at Sterling Cooper unannounced, and surprises him by taking him to see a large apartment she wants to buy. Pete protests it is too expensive for his current wage; Trudy suggests asking her father for money for the down payment, but Pete rejects the idea. Pete meets his privileged, elite parents on Fishers Island and his father criticizes his profession, wife and the neighborhood where she would like to live. Pete asks his father for the money but his father rejects him, saying it's "not a good idea."

In the office, Don sees Rachel, whose account is now managed by Paul. She rejects his invitation for lunch. Pete, Don, and Sal Romano meet with Bethlehem Steel but their initial idea is rejected, and Don blames Pete for not properly preparing the client. Pete and Trudy have dinner with Trudy's parents; Trudy goes against Pete's wishes and asks her father for the money, who proudly agrees, leaving Pete angry, to which Trudy is oblivious.

Betty begins a tentative friendship with Helen after helping Helen to evade her ex-husband. Helen asks Betty to babysit her children one evening while she works on John F. Kennedy's presidential campaign. Betty is shocked when Helen's son Glen deliberately walks in on her in the bathroom. Later, Glen asks her for a lock of her hair, which she gives him.

After dinner, Pete has a late meeting with Bethlehem Steel, during which he pitches his own idea without consulting his superiors. The next day, Don is enraged when the client expresses enthusiasm for Pete's idea, causing him to fire Pete. Don and Roger meet with the company's senior partner, Bert Cooper, who tells them they cannot fire Pete due to his family's connections with New York City's hereditary wealthy elite. Don and Roger later lie to Pete, claiming that Roger and Bert wanted him fired, but Don fought for Pete to have a second chance. A grateful Pete obsequiously thanks Don. That night, Pete and Trudy inspect their prospective home. When a new neighbor says how impressed she is hearing of Pete's Knickerbocker connections from Trudy, Pete dejectedly stares out of his apartment window.

== First appearances ==
- Andrew Campbell: Pete's elderly father and Dorothy's husband who disapproves of his son's job.
- Dorothy Dyckman-Campbell: Pete's elderly mother, Andrew's wife and a member of the rich Dyckman family.
- Jeannie Vogel: Tom's wife, Trudy's mother and Pete's mother-in-law.
- Tom Vogel: Pete's father-in-law, Trudy's father, Jeannie's husband and the CEO of Vicks Chemicals and Clearasil.
- Trudy Vogel-Campbell: Pete's newlywed wife, Tom and Jeannie's daughter.

== Cultural references ==
Pete and his co-workers listen to the comedy album The Button-Down Mind of Bob Newhart, which Paul Kinsey compares unfavorably with Lenny Bruce. Don discusses an ad that will play during commercial breaks of Bonanza. Pete offers to take a client to a production of Bye Bye Birdie. Helen volunteers for John F. Kennedy's presidential campaign. Roger reads a copy of the New York Herald Tribune in one scene. Bert Cooper hums the children's song "This Old Man" after admonishing Don and Roger and saving Pete Campbell's career.

== Reception ==
The episode received positive reviews from critics. Alan Sepinwall, writing for New Jersey's The Star-Ledger, praised the episode for developing and "humanizing" the character of Pete Campbell. Andrew Johnston, writing for Slant Magazine, similarly praised the episode for its development of Pete's character, as well as John Slattery's performance. Emily St. James, writing for The A.V. Club in 2013, called the episode an example of how the series was "capable of such remarkable transcendence."
