= Marriage of Figaro (Mad Men) =

- Mad Men episode
- Episode no.: Season 1 Episode 3
- Directed by: Ed Bianchi
- Written by: Tom Palmer
- Original air date: August 2, 2007
- Running time: 45 minutes

Guest appearances
- John Slattery as Roger Sterling; Anne Dudek as Francine Hanson; Darby Stanchfield as Helen Bishop; Alistair Duncan as George Pelham; Jerry Kernion as Larry; Kristoffer Polaha as Carlton Hanson

Episode chronology
← Previous "Ladies Room"	Next → "New Amsterdam"
- Mad Men season 1

"Marriage of Figaro" is the third episode of the first season of the American television drama series Mad Men. It was written by Tom Palmer and directed by Ed Bianchi. The episode originally aired on the AMC channel in the United States on August 2, 2007.

== Plot ==
Don is caught off guard on the train by a man who recognizes him from their days in the Korean War and refers to him as "Dick Whitman". Don makes non-committal plans about reconnecting with the man and neglects to discuss his current identity.

Pete returns to Sterling Cooper from his honeymoon. He is startled to discover several people dressed as Chinese peasants and live chickens in his office, a prank set up by the agency's staff. Ken, Harry and Paul try to learn explicit details about his honeymoon, but Pete refuses to discuss. Meanwhile, Don dislikes Doyle Dane Bernbach's new ad campaign for Volkswagen and Roger is puzzled why a Jewish advertising executive would want to help Germans; Pete says it is "brilliant".

Peggy and Pete agree to pretend nothing occurred between them. Later, Peggy chats with the other women about Lady Chatterley's Lover, who state men will not read it because it is romantic. Joan comments how it shows people think marriage is a joke, due to the novel's extensive infidelity. During a meeting, Ken, Harry and Paul joke about the appeal of one's wife dying and embarrass themselves after revealing they have not visited Rachel's department store. Later, Pete expresses content at being married and engaging in fidelity.

Don tours Rachel's family's department store. On the rooftop, she shows him the store's guard dogs and says dogs "can be everything" to a girl. She also tells Don her mother died during her birth. Don kisses her impulsively, then admits that he is married. In response, Rachel tells Don that she wants someone else in charge of her account at Sterling Cooper.

That weekend, Don and Betty prepare for their daughter Sally's birthday party. Don spends the morning assembling a playhouse for her and continues the day drinking. Betty gossips with the other housewives about Helen, who arrives at the party with her son Glen, but she is treated like an outcast due to her failed marriage. The housewives imply to her that she is promiscuous and find it suspicious that she frequently goes for long walks in the neighborhood. The fathers at the party, meanwhile, leer at her and Francine's husband, Carlton, unsuccessfully propositions her.

Don films the party with a handheld camera, and notices a couple sharing a tender, loving moment, which appears to distress him. Betty sees Don and Helen standing together, and quickly rushes to ask him to pick up Sally's birthday cake. However, after getting the cake, he drives by his house, leaving Betty humiliated in front the neighbors when he does not immediately return. He returns late that night with a dog as Sally's birthday gift, leaving Betty ambivalent.

== First appearances ==
- Carlton Hanson: Francine's husband, Ernie's father and the Drapers' next door neighbor.
- Helen Bishop: a divorcée with a job who's new in the neighborhood.
- Glen Bishop: Helen's young son who is invited to Sally's birthday party.

== Cultural references ==
The episode's title refers to the Mozart opera of the same name, which can also be heard playing on the radio during Sally's party.

The secretary pool discusses Lady Chatterley's Lover in scandalous tones.

The creative team at Sterling Cooper discuss the "Think Small" and "Lemon" campaigns, which was considered revolutionary in the advertising industry during the time in which the episode is set.

== Reception ==
Although critics' reviews for "Marriage of Figaro" were not unanimously positive, most saw character development as a strength of the episode. Alan Sepinwall of New Jersey's The Star-Ledger enjoyed the focus on Don's identity, which he wrote was the show's "most involving element" at that point in the series. In 2013, Emily VanDerWerff of The A.V. Club graded the episode an "A−", praising its having delved into Don's character in what was only a third episode. Six years after its initial airing, VanDerWerff wrote retrospectively:

The task Mad Men set for itself from very early in its run was a tough one. Lacking the sorts of obvious external stakes that drive many of its cable drama cousins, the show was forced to figure out ways to portray interiority, the psychological makeup and emotional lives of its characters, without often resorting to them simply sitting down and telling us how they feel. It's for this reason that so many people I know have struggled with the show for several episodes—if not several seasons—until everything finally clicks in some episode and they realize the scope and ambition of what the show has pulled off. Mad Men is a show about things like anomie and emptiness, about boredom and frustration and intimacy. It's a show where the big moment can sometimes be something as simple as a beautiful woman sliding a handsome man's cufflink back to him when it drops from his wrist. "The Marriage of Figaro" has a very deliberate work/home split, following Don Draper in both environments and seeing how he fits (or doesn't fit) in either one.
