= Shoot (Mad Men) =

- Mad Men episode
- Episode no.: Season 1 Episode 9
- Directed by: Paul Feig
- Written by: Chris Provenzano; Matthew Weiner
- Original air date: September 13, 2007
- Running time: 46 minutes

Guest appearances
- John Slattery as Roger Sterling; Robert Morse as Bert Cooper; Nathan Anderson as Ronnie Gittridge; Crista Flanagan as Lois Sadler; Anne Dudek as Francine Hanson; H. Richard Greene as Jim Hobart; Dey Young as Adele Hobart; Andy Umberger as Dr. Arnold Wayne

Episode chronology
← Previous "The Hobo Code"	Next → "Long Weekend"
- Mad Men season 1

"Shoot" is the ninth episode of the first season of the American television drama series Mad Men. It was written by Chris Provenzano and series creator Matthew Weiner and was directed by Paul Feig. The episode originally aired on the AMC channel in the United States on September 13, 2007.

== Plot ==
During the intermission of Fiorello! on Broadway, Don and Betty run into Jim Hobart, the head of rival advertising agency McCann Erickson. Jim tries to recruit Don and offers Betty a modeling opportunity for their Coca-Cola campaign, which excites her. Don, however, is indifferent. At home, Betty reassures Don that she can still manage her responsibilities at home if she works; he relents after she proposes her friend, Ethel, can help watch the children. She goes on to secure the campaign. Meanwhile, Sally's dog attacks a neighbor's pigeon, and the neighbor threatens to shoot the dog if it happens again.

Pete and Harry strategize to help Richard Nixon's 1960 presidential campaign: Pete suggests buying ad space for Secor Laxatives in swing states, blocking Nixon's rival John F. Kennedy from running competing ads. The plan succeeds, earning praise from Bert and Roger. Peggy, frustrated by a recent gain in weight, accidentally rips her skirt and changes into an ill-fitting dress stored in the office by Joan. When Peggy returns it, Joan advises her on losing weight to get closer to Paul, but Peggy insists she is focused on her writing, not attracting men. Later, Ken insults Peggy's weight, leading Pete to punch him, with Paul intervening to make peace.

Sally has a nightmare about their neighbor's threat, angering Don, but Betty convinces him not to confront the neighbor. Roger notices McCann's interest in Don, but Don stays non-committal. When Betty's shoot photos arrive, Don walks into Roger's office to turn down McCann's offer, negotiating a higher salary and promising he will not leave for another advertising agency. This ends Betty's modeling aspirations, as Don deduces Jim used Betty to recruit him, and she is upset. That night, Betty hides that she was let go from the campaign, telling Don she did not want to be away from home and is scared of Manhattan. Don reassures her that he values her as a great mother, calling her an angel. Betty smiles, but hides her true feelings. The following day, she takes Bobby's BB gun and shoots at the neighbor's pigeons.

== First appearances ==
- Jim Hobart: the head CEO of McCann-Erickson, a rival advertising agency.

== Reception ==
The episode was received positively by critics. Alan Sepinwall, writing for New Jersey's The Star-Ledger, praised the episode, singling out Betty's story, the ending of which he described as "scary, tragic, funny, and kinda hot, all in one." Andrew Johnston, writing for Slant Magazine, called the episode "a relative disappointment" following "The Hobo Code", but still praised the complexity of the episode's story.
