= Ladies Room (Mad Men) =

- Mad Men episode
- Episode no.: Season 1 Episode 2
- Directed by: Alan Taylor
- Written by: Matthew Weiner
- Original air date: July 26, 2007
- Running time: 47 minutes

Guest appearances
- John Slattery as Roger Sterling; Rosemarie DeWitt as Midge Daniels; Robert Morse as Bert Cooper; Anne Dudek as Francine Hanson; Talia Balsam as Mona Sterling; Mark Kelly as Dale; Darby Stanchfield as Helen Bishop; Andy Umberger as Dr. Arnold Wayne

Episode chronology
← Previous "Smoke Gets in Your Eyes"	Next → "Marriage of Figaro"
- Mad Men season 1

"Ladies Room" is the second episode of the first season of the American television drama series Mad Men. It was written by series creator Matthew Weiner and directed by Alan Taylor. Weiner has stated that the interval between writing the pilot and the second episode lasted seven years. The episode originally aired on the AMC channel in the United States on July 26, 2007.

== Plot ==
During dinner, Betty, Roger and his wife Mona all talk about their affluent childhoods to Don, who deflects questions about his past and later comments to Betty that he views pride as sinful and does not like to talk about himself. Betty is troubled - her mother has recently died and she has begun periodically experiencing her hands going numb. Betty's physicians suggest she try psychoanalysis, an idea that upsets Don.

Ken Cosgrove and Paul Kinsey make separate sexual advances at Peggy but Peggy rejects both of them, prompting Paul to ask, "Do you belong to someone else?" Peggy expresses annoyance at being targeted by the males in the office. Joan responds by advising Peggy to "enjoy it while it lasts." Sterling Cooper is revealed to have a toxic workplace culture: Roger is a cynical and distant alcoholic, the agency's male staff make persistent sexual advances to the women, and Bert Cooper, the agency's senior partner, pressures Don to assist with Richard Nixon's 1960 presidential campaign.

Don leads an advertising campaign for men's Gillette aerosol deodorant, leading him and his co-workers to struggle to determine "what women want". Later, he asks Midge, who responds "not being asked something like that." Don then comes up with the catchphrase: "Any excuse to get closer."

Betty gossips with her neighbor Francine about Helen, a divorcée who has moved onto their street. Francine suggests Helen's presence may be bad for real estate values. In Betty's first therapy session, she talks about her relationship with her late mother and her insecurities about Helen. After Don and Betty arrive home from dinner, he privately calls Betty's therapist and consults the notes from Betty's session.

== Cultural references ==
Don and Roger discuss Richard Nixon's campaign in the upcoming election. Paul reveals himself to be a fan of The Twilight Zone and does an impression of Rod Serling. Several characters watch the series People Are Funny.

== First appearances ==
- Bertram "Bert" Cooper: the founder and one of the original partners of Sterling-Cooper.
- Dale: a copywriter at Sterling-Cooper.
- Francine Hanson: Betty's next door neighbor, best friend and confidante.
- Dr. Arnold Wayne: Betty's psychiatrist given to her by Don.
- Mona Sterling: Roger's wife and Margaret's mother.

== Deceased ==
- Ruth Hofstadt: Betty's mother, Sally and Bobby's maternal grandmother, Don's mother-in-law and Gene's wife. Dies of a heart attack offscreen, mentioned by Betty to Mona.

== Reception ==
The episode received positive critical reviews from television journalists and critics. Alan Sepinwall, writing for New Jersey's The Star-Ledger, praised the episode for expanding the role of female characters, building on the characters established in the pilot, writing "the small details of how these characters are written and played gives [...] real meaning." Andrew Johnston, writing for Slant Magazine was also impressed by the episode, comparing the series favorably to The Sopranos and praising Michael Gladis' acting in particular.
