= Ladies Room =

Ladies Room may refer to:

== Place ==
- Women's restroom

== Art, entertainment, and media ==
=== Film ===
- Ladies Room (1999), 199 film with Nanette Workman
- Ladies Room, The Ladies Room, and Ladiesroom, the titles of numerous films listed in IMDb

=== Music ===
- "Ladies Room", song by Kiss on Rock and Roll Over (1976)
- "Ladies Room", song by Olivia Dean on Messy (2023)
- Ladies Room, a visual kei rock band from Japan.

=== Television ===
- "Ladies Room", Mad Men season one, episode two

=== Web series ===
- "The Ladies Room" (2007), an episode of the interactive web-based video series Lonelygirl15
