= 14th Screen Actors Guild Awards =

- Awarded for: Outstanding motion picture and primetime television performances
- Date: January 27, 2008
- Location: Shrine Auditorium; Los Angeles, California
- Country: United States
- Presented by: Screen Actors Guild
- Website: www.sagawards.org

Television/radio coverage
- Network: TNT and TBS simultaneous broadcast

The 14th Annual Screen Actors Guild Awards, awarded by the Screen Actors Guild and honoring the best achievements in film and television performances for the year 2007, took place on January 27, 2008, at the Shrine Exposition Center in Los Angeles, California. It was the 12th consecutive year the ceremony was held at the center, and the ceremony was broadcast live simultaneously by TNT and TBS.

The nominees were announced on December 20, 2007, by Jeanne Tripplehorn and Terrence Howard at Los Angeles' Pacific Design Center's Silver Screen Theater.

Into the Wild received the highest number of nominations among the film categories with four, three for acting and one for ensemble performance. In the television categories The Sopranos, 30 Rock and Ugly Betty had the most nominations with three each.

The 2007 Screen Actors Guild Awards was the first to give awards for Outstanding Performance by a Stunt Ensemble in a Motion Picture and Outstanding Performance by a Stunt Ensemble in a Television Series.

The 2007 ceremony celebrated the 75th anniversary of the Screen Actors Guild with historical background and film clips presented in segments introduced by Blair Underwood throughout the ceremony. Charles Durning was presented with an award for Lifetime Achievement following accolades by Denis Leary and Burt Reynolds.

The ceremony was held in the midst of the ongoing Writers Guild of America strike. Because the acting community steadfastly had supported the writers during this period, the WGA granted a waiver on December 11, 2007, to SAG for the awards show, allowing members to attend without having to cross picket lines. While talk of the strike was kept to a minimum, Julie Christie openly acknowledged it in her acceptance speech, commenting, "It's lovely to receive an award from your own union, especially at a time when we're being so forcefully reminded how important unions are." In her acceptance speech, Tina Fey thanked the Screen Actors Guild for its support of the WGA.

After acknowledging the recent death of Heath Ledger, Daniel Day-Lewis dedicated his award to the actor.

== Winners and nominees ==
Winners are listed first and highlighted in boldface.

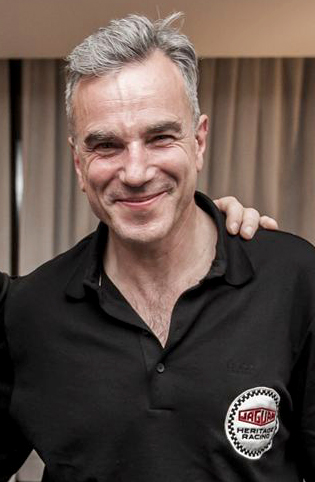
Daniel Day-Lewis, Outstanding Performance by a Male Actor in a Leading Role winner

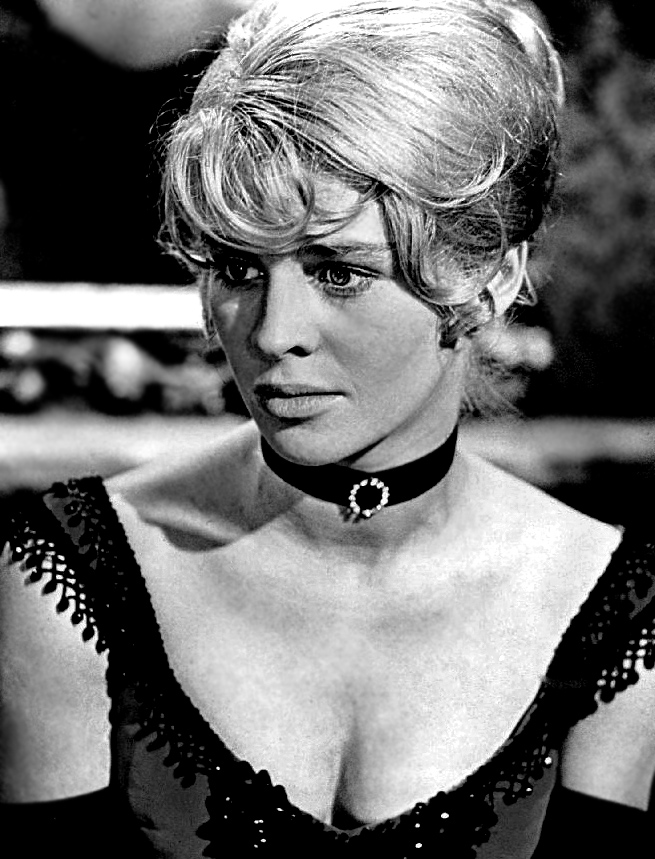
Julie Christie, Outstanding Performance by a Female Actor in a Leading Role winner

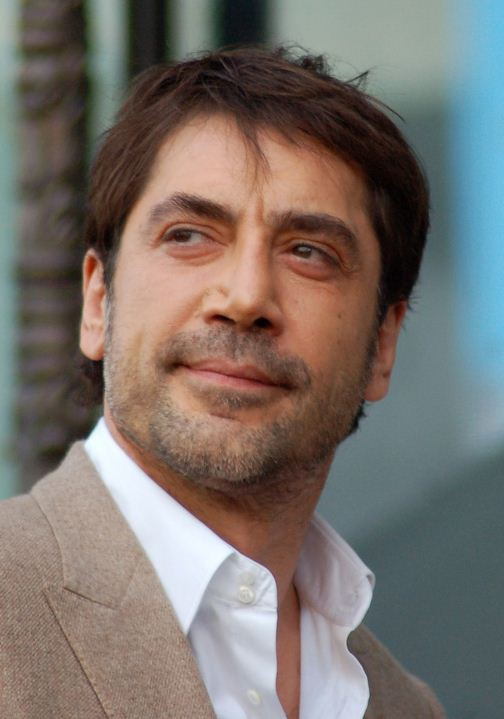
Javier Bardem, Outstanding Performance by a Male Actor in a Supporting Role winner

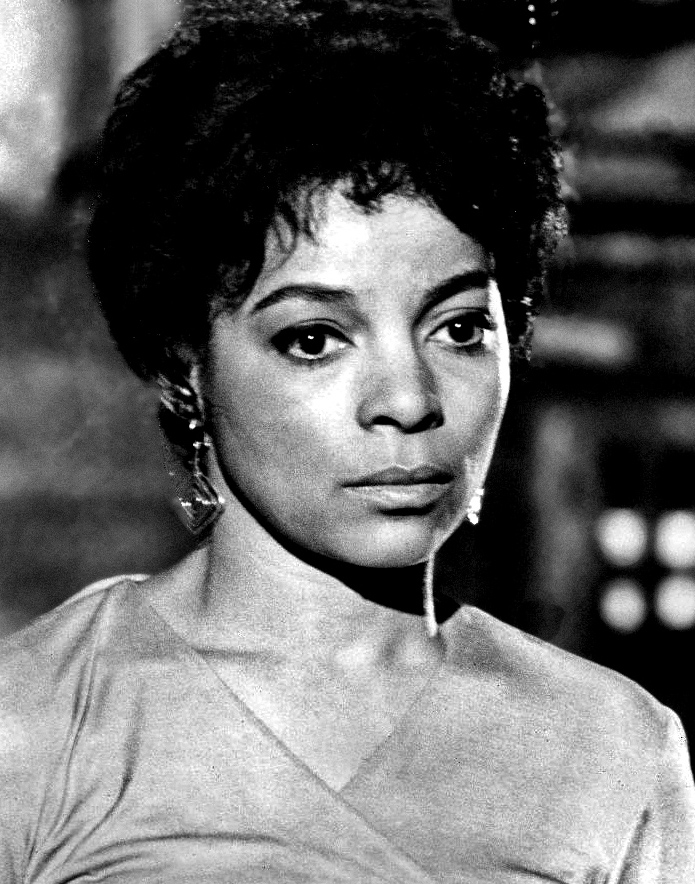
Ruby Dee, Outstanding Performance by a Female Actor in a Supporting Role winner

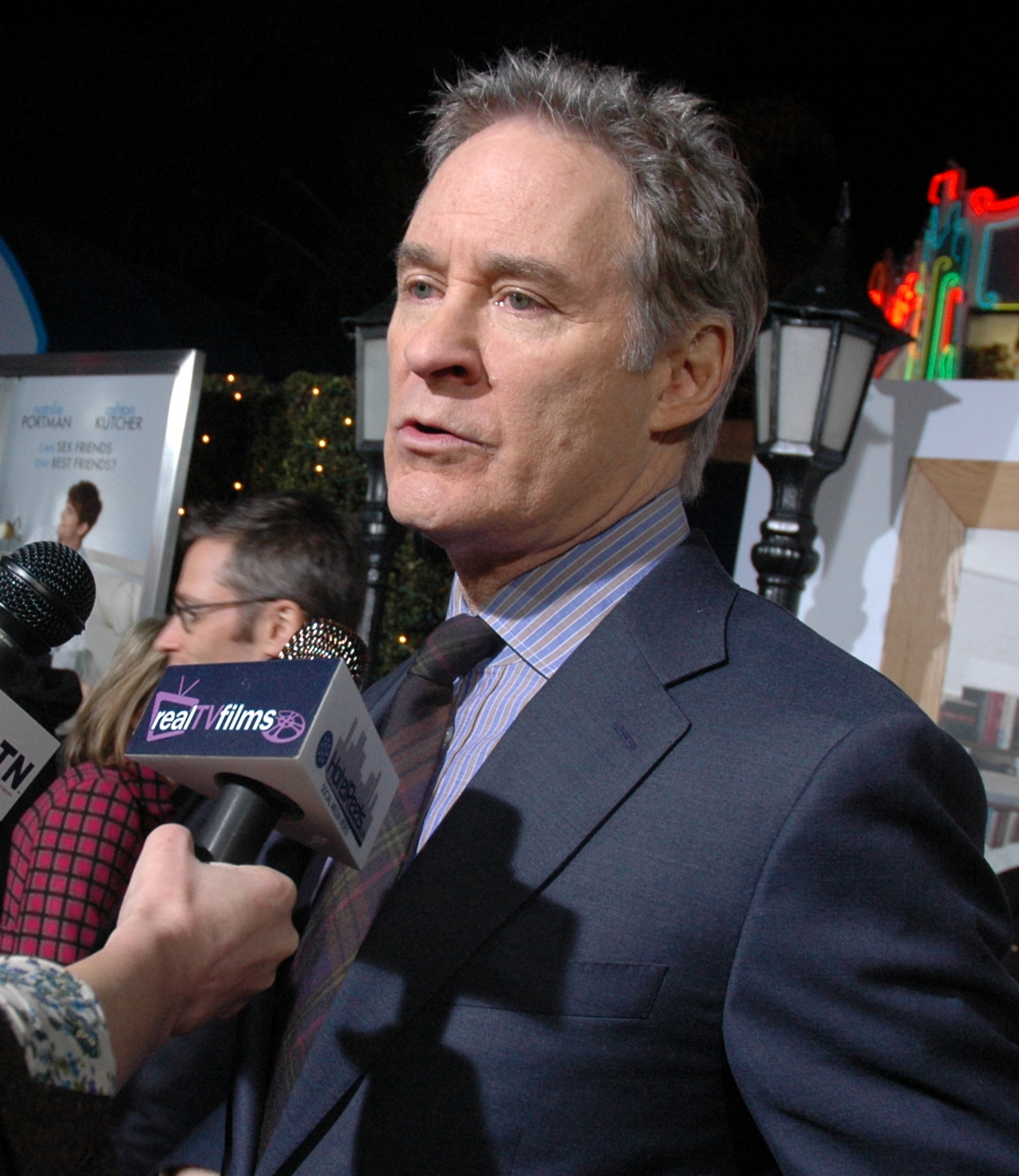
Kevin Kline, Outstanding Performance by a Male Actor in a Miniseries or Television Movie winner

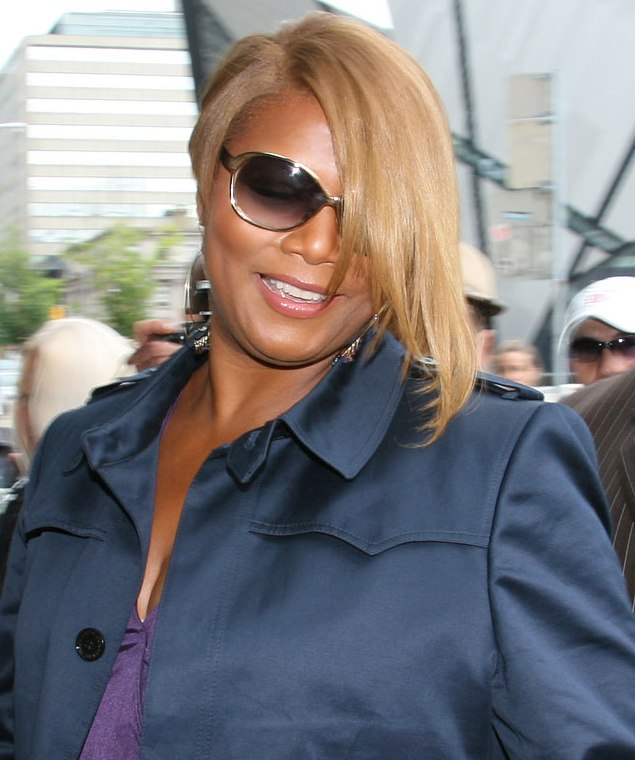
Queen Latifah, Outstanding Performance by a Female Actor in a Miniseries or Television Movie winner

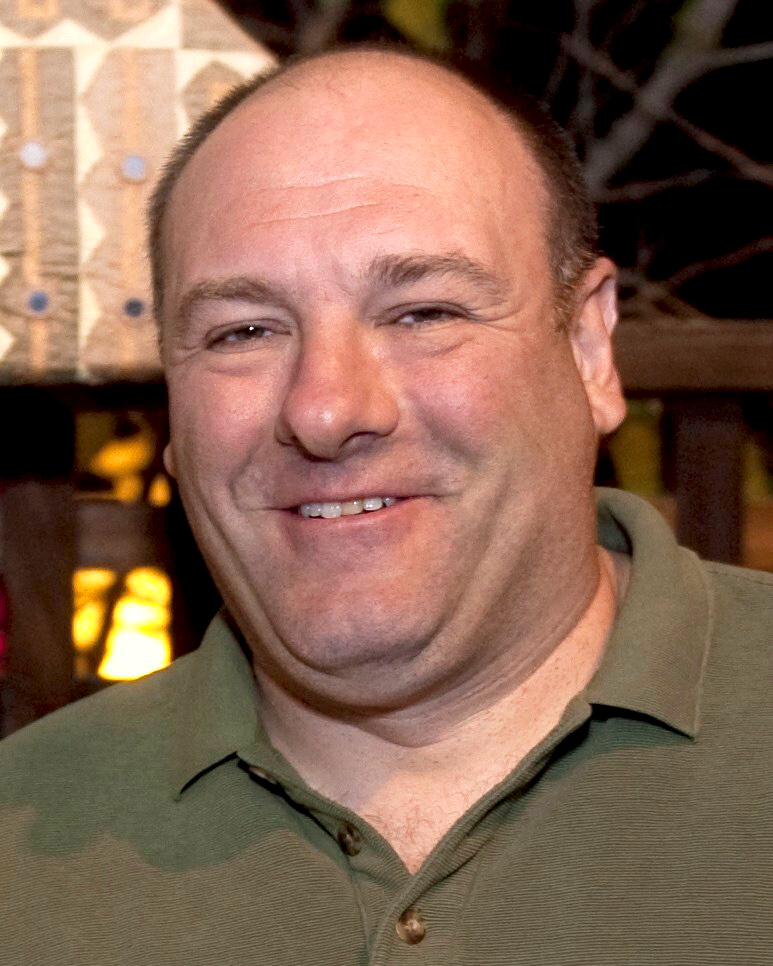
James Gandolfini, Outstanding Performance by a Male Actor in a Drama Series winner

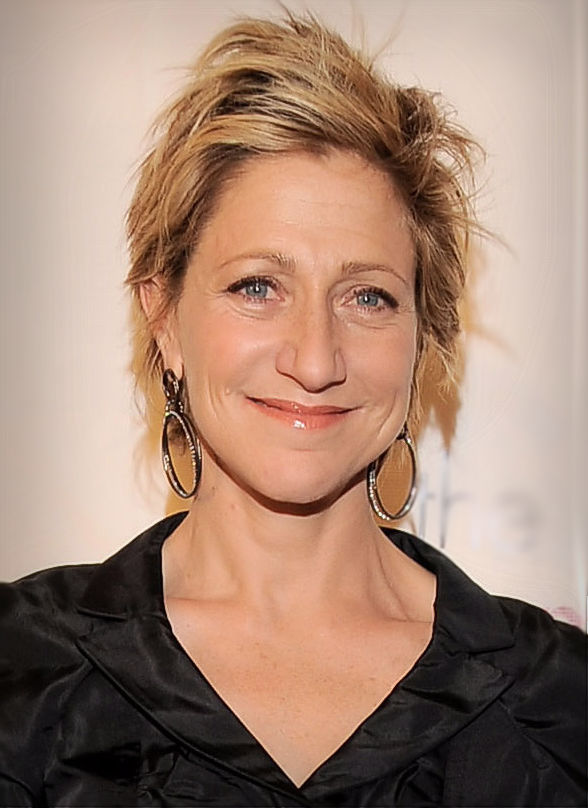
Edie Falco, Outstanding Performance by a Female Actor in a Drama Series winner

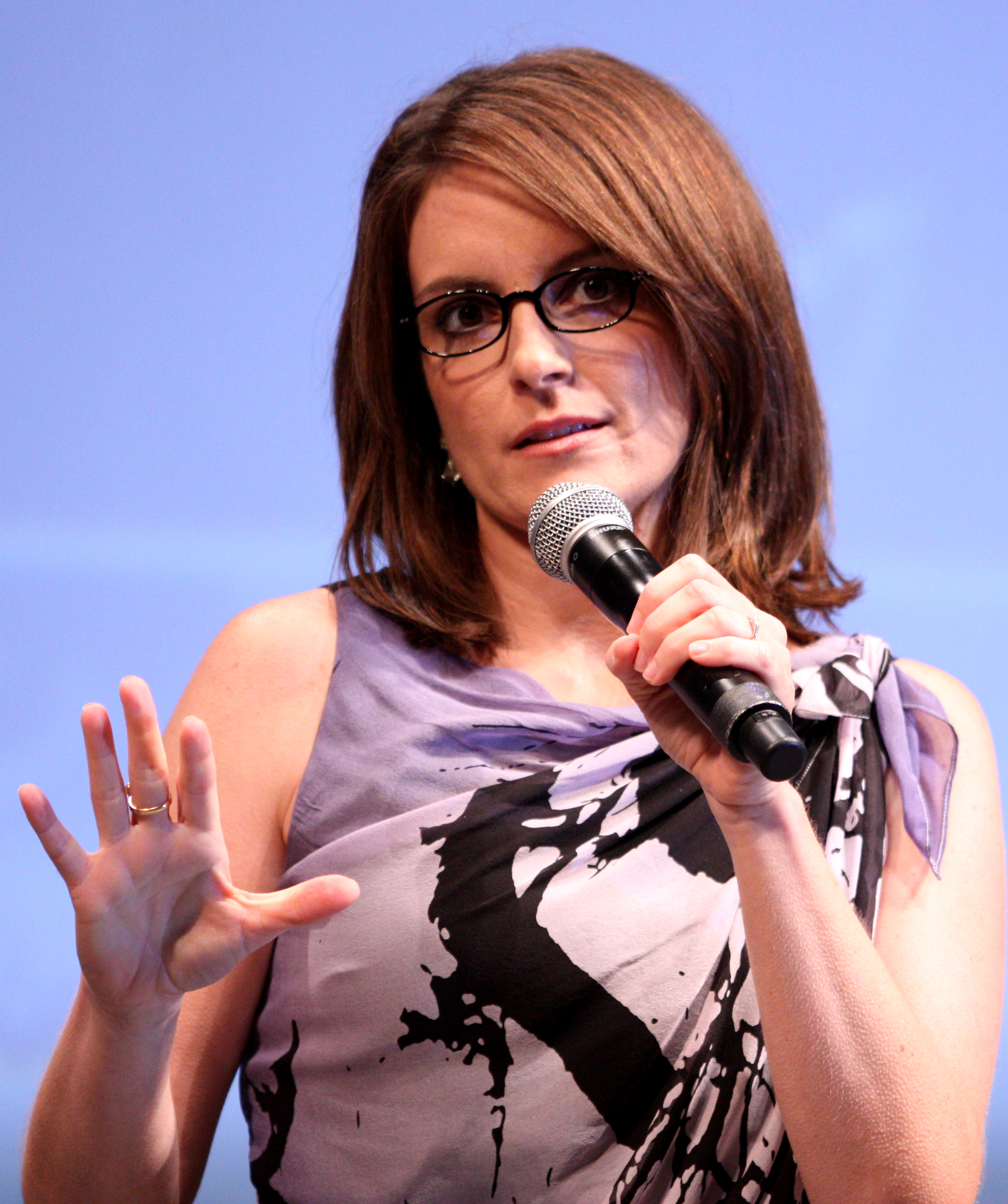
Tina Fey, Outstanding Performance by a Female Actor in a Comedy Series winner

=== Film ===
Outstanding Performance by a Male Actor in a Leading Role	Outstanding Performance by a Female Actor in a Leading Role
**Daniel Day-Lewis – There Will Be Blood as Daniel Plainview**; George Clooney – Michael Clayton as Michael Clayton; Ryan Gosling – Lars and the Real Girl as Lars Lindstrom; Emile Hirsch – Into the Wild as Christopher McCandless; Viggo Mortensen – Eastern Promises as Nikolai Luzhin	**Julie Christie – Away from Her as Fiona Anderson**; Cate Blanchett – Elizabeth: The Golden Age as Queen Elizabeth I; Marion Cotillard – La Vie en Rose as Édith Piaf; Angelina Jolie – A Mighty Heart as Mariane Pearl; Elliot Page (Note: Credited as Ellen Page) – Juno as Juno MacGuff
Outstanding Performance by a Male Actor in a Supporting Role	Outstanding Performance by a Female Actor in a Supporting Role
**Javier Bardem – No Country for Old Men as Anton Chigurh**; Casey Affleck – The Assassination of Jesse James by the Coward Robert Ford as Robert Ford; Hal Holbrook – Into the Wild as Ron Franz; Tommy Lee Jones – No Country for Old Men as Ed Tom Bell; Tom Wilkinson – Michael Clayton as Arthur Edens	**Ruby Dee – American Gangster as Mama Lucas**; Cate Blanchett – I'm Not There as Jude Quinn; Catherine Keener – Into the Wild as Jan Burres; Amy Ryan – Gone Baby Gone as Helene McCready; Tilda Swinton – Michael Clayton as Karen Crowder
Outstanding Performance by a Cast in a Motion Picture	Outstanding Performance by a Stunt Ensemble in a Motion Picture
**No Country for Old Men – Javier Bardem, Josh Brolin, Garret Dillahunt, Tess Harper, Woody Harrelson, Tommy Lee Jones, and Kelly Macdonald**; 3:10 to Yuma – Christian Bale, Russell Crowe, Peter Fonda, Ben Foster, Logan Lerman, Gretchen Mol, Dallas Roberts, Vinessa Shaw, and Alan Tudyk; American Gangster – Armand Assante, Josh Brolin, Russell Crowe, Ruby Dee, Chiwetel Ejiofor, Idris Elba, Cuba Gooding Jr., Carla Gugino, John Hawkes, Ted Levine, Joe Morton, Lymari Nadal, John Ortiz, RZA, Yul Vazquez, and Denzel Washington; Hairspray – Nikki Blonsky, Amanda Bynes, Paul Dooley, Zac Efron, Allison Janney, Elijah Kelley, James Marsden, Michelle Pfeiffer, Queen Latifah, Brittany Snow, Jerry Stiller, John Travolta, and Christopher Walken; Into the Wild – Brian H. Dierker, Marcia Gay Harden, Emile Hirsch, Hal Holbrook, William Hurt, Catherine Keener, Jena Malone, Kristen Stewart, and Vince Vaughn	**The Bourne Ultimatum**; 300; I Am Legend; The Kingdom; Pirates of the Caribbean: At World's End

=== Television ===
Outstanding Performance by a Male Actor in a Miniseries or Television Movie	Outstanding Performance by a Female Actor in a Miniseries or Television Movie
**Kevin Kline – As You Like It (HBO) as Jaques**; Michael Keaton – The Company (TNT) as James Jesus Angleton/Mother; Oliver Platt – The Bronx Is Burning (ESPN) as George Steinbrenner; Sam Shepard – Ruffian (ABC) as Frank Whiteley; John Turturro – The Bronx Is Burning (ESPN) as Billy Martin	**Queen Latifah – Life Support (HBO) as Ana Wallace**; Ellen Burstyn – For One More Day (ABC) as Pauline "Posey" Benetto; Debra Messing – The Starter Wife (USA Network) as Molly Kagan; Anna Paquin – Bury My Heart at Wounded Knee (HBO) as Elaine Goodale; Vanessa Redgrave – The Fever (HBO) as Woman; Gena Rowlands – What If God Were the Sun? (Lifetime) as Melissa Eisenbloom
Outstanding Performance by a Male Actor in a Drama Series	Outstanding Performance by a Female Actor in a Drama Series
**James Gandolfini – The Sopranos (HBO) as Tony Soprano**; Michael C. Hall – Dexter (Showtime) as Dexter Morgan; Jon Hamm – Mad Men (AMC) as Don Draper; Hugh Laurie – House (Fox) as Dr. Gregory House; James Spader – Boston Legal (ABC) as Alan Shore	**Edie Falco – The Sopranos (HBO) as Carmela Soprano**; Glenn Close – Damages (FX) as Patty Hewes; Sally Field – Brothers & Sisters (ABC) as Nora Walker; Holly Hunter – Saving Grace (TNT) as Grace Hanadarko; Kyra Sedgwick – The Closer (TNT) as Det. Brenda Leigh Johnson
Outstanding Performance by a Male Actor in a Comedy Series	Outstanding Performance by a Female Actor in a Comedy Series
**Alec Baldwin – 30 Rock (NBC) as Jack Donaghy**; Steve Carell – The Office (NBC) as Michael Scott; Ricky Gervais – Extras (HBO) as Andy Millman; Jeremy Piven – Entourage (HBO) as Ari Gold; Tony Shalhoub – Monk (USA Network) as Adrian Monk	**Tina Fey – 30 Rock (NBC) as Liz Lemon**; Christina Applegate – Samantha Who? (ABC) as Samantha Newly; America Ferrera – Ugly Betty (ABC) as Betty Suarez; Mary-Louise Parker – Weeds (Showtime) as Nancy Botwin; Vanessa Williams – Ugly Betty (ABC) as Wilhelmina Slater
Outstanding Performance by an Ensemble in a Drama Series	Outstanding Performance by an Ensemble in a Comedy Series
**The Sopranos (HBO)** – Gregory Antonacci, Lorraine Bracco, Edie Falco, James Gandolfini, Dan Grimaldi, Robert Iler, Michael Imperioli, Arthur J. Nascarella, Steven R. Schirripa, Matt Servitto, Jamie-Lynn Sigler, Tony Sirico, Aida Turturro, Steven Van Zandt, and Frank Vincent; Boston Legal (ABC) – Rene Auberjonois, Candice Bergen, Julie Bowen, Saffron Burrows, Christian Clemenson, Taraji P. Henson, John Larroquette, William Shatner, James Spader, Tara Summers, Mark Valley, Gary Anthony Williams, and Constance Zimmer; The Closer (TNT) – G. W. Bailey, Michael Paul Chan, Raymond Cruz, Tony Denison, Robert Gossett, Gina Ravera, Corey Reynolds, Kyra Sedgwick, J. K. Simmons, and Jon Tenney; Grey's Anatomy (ABC) – Justin Chambers, Eric Dane, Patrick Dempsey, Katherine Heigl, T. R. Knight, Chyler Leigh, Sandra Oh, James Pickens Jr., Ellen Pompeo, Sara Ramirez, Elizabeth Reaser, Brooke Smith, Kate Walsh, Isaiah Washington, and Chandra Wilson; Mad Men (AMC) – Bryan Batt, Anne Dudek, Michael Gladis, Jon Hamm, Christina Hendricks, January Jones, Vincent Kartheiser, Robert Morse, Elisabeth Moss, Maggie Siff, John Slattery, Rich Sommer, and Aaron Staton	**The Office (NBC)** – Leslie David Baker, Brian Baumgartner, Steve Carell, David Denman, Jenna Fischer, Kate Flannery, Melora Hardin, Mindy Kaling, Angela Kinsey, John Krasinski, Paul Lieberstein, B. J. Novak, Oscar Nunez, Phyllis Smith, and Rainn Wilson; 30 Rock (NBC) – Scott Adsit, Alec Baldwin, Katrina Bowden, Kevin Brown, Grizz Chapman, Tina Fey, Judah Friedlander, Jane Krakowski, Jack McBrayer, Tracy Morgan, Maulik Pancholy, Keith Powell, and Lonny Ross; Desperate Housewives (ABC) – Andrea Bowen, Ricardo Antonio Chavira, Marcia Cross, Dana Delany, James Denton, Nathan Fillion, Lyndsy Fonseca, Rachel Fox, Teri Hatcher, Zane Huett, Felicity Huffman, Kathryn Joosten, Brent Kinsman, Shane Kinsman, Joy Lauren, Eva Longoria, Kyle MacLachlan, Shawn Pyfrom, Doug Savant, Dougray Scott, Nicollette Sheridan, John Slattery, and Brenda Strong; Entourage (HBO) – Rhys Coiro, Kevin Connolly, Kevin Dillon, Jerry Ferrara, Adrian Grenier, Rex Lee, Jeremy Piven, and Perrey Reeves; Ugly Betty (ABC) – Alan Dale, America Ferrera, Christopher Gorham, Mark Indelicato, Ashley Jensen, Judith Light, Eric Mabius, Becki Newton, Ana Ortiz, Tony Plana, Rebecca Romijn, Stelio Savante, Michael Urie, and Vanessa Williams
Outstanding Performance by a Stunt Ensemble in a Television Series	
**24 (Fox)**; Heroes (NBC); Lost (ABC); Rome (HBO); The Unit (CBS)	

=== Screen Actors Guild Life Achievement Award ===
The Screen Actors Guild Life Achievement Award was presented to:

- Charles Durning

== Multiple nominations ==
=== Film ===
Nominations	Film
3	Into the Wild
3	Michael Clayton
3	No Country for Old Men
2	American Gangster

=== Television ===
Nominations	Program
3	30 Rock
3	The Sopranos
3	Ugly Betty
2	Boston Legal
2	The Bronx Is Burning
2	The Closer
2	Entourage
2	Mad Men
2	The Office

== Multiple wins ==
=== Film ===
Wins	Film
2	No Country for Old Men

=== Television ===
Wins	Program
3	The Sopranos
2	30 Rock

== "In Memoriam" ==
Denis Leary introduced a previously recorded "In Memoriam" segment which honored the life and career of the great actors who died last year:

- Merv Griffin
- Charles Nelson Reilly
- Barbara McNair
- Brad Renfro
- Janet Blair
- Allan Melvin
- Lois Nettleton
- Tige Andrews
- Miyoshi Umeki
- George Grizzard
- Percy Rodriguez
- Ron Carey
- Charles Lane
- Joey Bishop
- Roscoe Lee Browne
- Floyd "Red Crow" Westerman
- Johnny Grant
- Alice Ghostley
- Kitty Carlisle
- James T. Callahan
- Robert Goulet
- Laraine Day
- Michael Kidd
- Marcel Marceau
- Alice Backes
- Lee Bergere
- Gretchen Wyler
- Ian Richardson
- Dick Wilson
- Barry Nelson
- Beverly Sills
- Dabbs Greer
- Suzanne Pleshette
- Tom Poston
- Jack Williams
- Luciano Pavarotti
- Jane Wyman
- Betty Hutton
- Deborah Kerr
- Heath Ledger
