= Kate Norby =

American actress

- Occupation: Actress
- Years active: 1999–present

Kate Norby is an American actress.

Norby's filmography includes Rob Zombie's horror film The Devil's Rejects. She has guest-starred in many television series, including Mad Men, and had recurring roles in Boston Public, Nip/Tuck and Swingtown.

== Filmography ==
=== Film ===
Year	Title	Role	Notes
2000	Believe	Margaret	Short film
2002	Scared	Samantha Cheek	
2003	Manfast	Kate	
2004	Blessing	Becca	Short film
2005	The Devil's Rejects	Wendy Banjo	
2014	Sleeping with the Dead	Sam	Short film
2017	Inheritance	Katherine Morse	
2018	Jane Love	Jane Love	Short film
2019	Tomorrow	Heroine	Short film

=== Television ===
Year	Title	Role	Notes
1999	Third Watch	Babe	"Hell Is What You Make of It"
1999	Time of Your Life	Peggy	"The Time Sarah Got Her Shih-Tzu Together"
2000	The Street	Marcey	"Miracle on Wall Street"
2001	Hopewell	N/A	TV movie
2001	Angel	Elisabeth	"Heartthrob"
2001	Taking Back Our Town	Tammy	TV film
2002	Crossing Jordan	Kelly McDonald	"Secrets & Lies: Part 1"
2002	For the People	Sharon Bryce	"The Double Standard"
2002	That Was Then	N/A	"A Rock and a Head Case"
2003	Then Came Jones	Lucy	TV film
2003–2004	Boston Public	Joannie Hanson	Recurring role
2005	Numb3rs	Karen Silber	"Pilot"
2005	Joan of Arcadia	Dr. Jennifer Davis	"Shadows and Light"
2005	CSI: Miami	Julie Sullivan	"Game Over"
2005	The Closer	Lindsey Hagan	"About Face"
2005	CSI: NY	Monica Drake	"City of the Dolls"
2006	The Unit	Pam	"Eating the Young"
2006	Bones	Karen Tyler	"Mother and Child in the Bay"
2006	Close to Home	Donna Kale	"Deacon"
2007	Cold Case	Ginny Williams	"Blackout"
2007	Lincoln Heights	Karen Mulaney	"Spree"
2007	NCIS	Diane Russio	"Dead Man Walking"
2007	Mad Men	Carol McCardy	"Red in the Face", "Long Weekend"
2007	Shark	Diane Hadley	"Burning Sensation"
2008	Swingtown	Gail Saxton	Recurring role
2010	Nip/Tuck	Marcy Hamill / "Virginia Hayes"	"Virginia Hayes"
2010	Past Life	Amanda Powell	"Pilot"
2009–2011	Big Love	Glory	Recurring role
2011	L.A. Noire	Lorna Pattison (voice)	Video game
2011	The Mentalist	Sally Carter	"Scarlet Ribbons"
2014	Stalker	Vanessa Lewis	"Crazy for You"
