= January Jones =

American actress (born 1978)

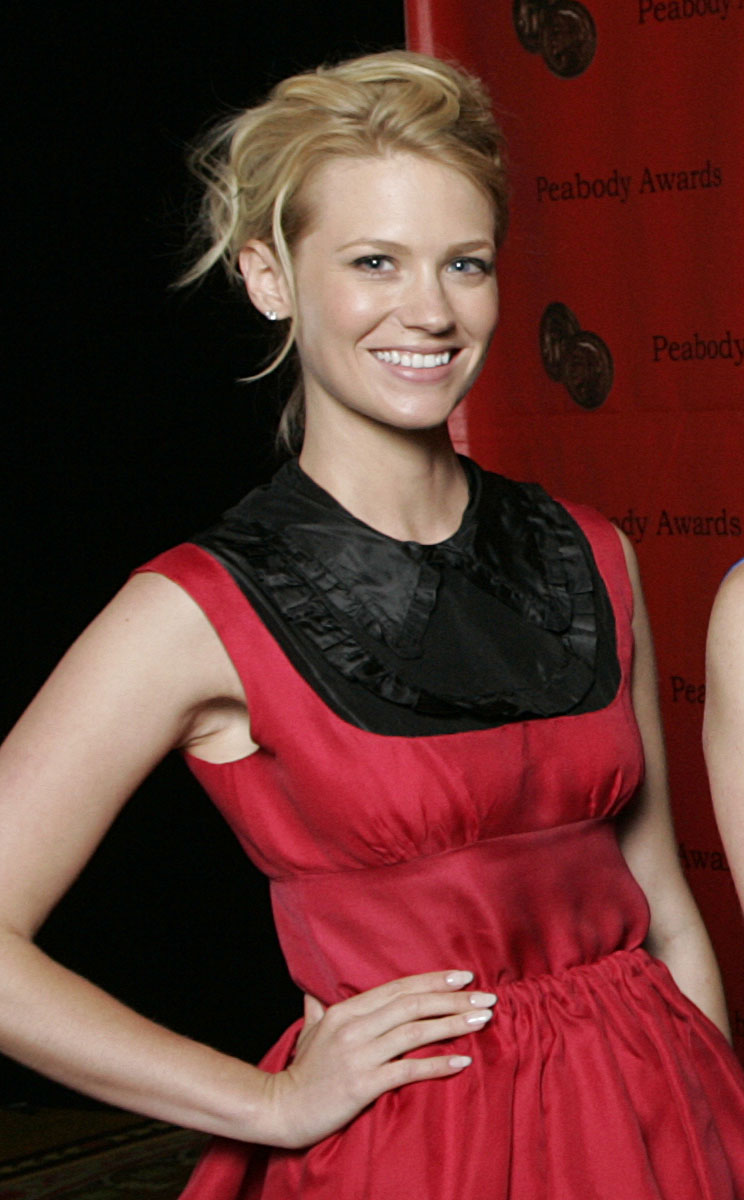
- Jones in 2008
- Born: January Kristen Jones; January 5, 1978 (age 48); Sioux Falls, South Dakota, U.S.
- Occupations: Actress; model
- Years active: 1999–present
- Children: 1

January Kristen Jones (born January 5, 1978) is an American actress. She is best known for playing Betty Draper in Mad Men (2007–2015), for which she was nominated for two Golden Globe Awards for Best Actress – Television Series Drama and a Primetime Emmy Award for Outstanding Lead Actress in a Drama Series.

She has portrayed Melissa Chartres in The Last Man on Earth (2015–2018) and starred in films such as American Wedding (2003), We Are Marshall (2006), The Boat That Rocked (2009), Unknown (2011), Seeking Justice (2011), and X-Men: First Class (2011).

== Early life ==
January Kristen Jones was born in Sioux Falls, South Dakota, on January 5, 1978, the daughter of store manager Karen Cox and exercise physiologist Marvin Jones. She was named after January Wayne, a character in the 1973 Jacqueline Susann novel Once Is Not Enough. She has two sisters, Jina and Jacey. Her family moved to Hecla, South Dakota, in 1979 but in 1986 returned to Sioux Falls, where she graduated from Roosevelt High School.

== Career ==
=== Modeling ===
Jones began her modeling career in New York at 18, after a modeling scout expressed interest while she was in high school. She has said that modeling was not her passion and she never took it seriously. Her first agency claimed she owed them money when she decided to move to Los Angeles. Jones has modeled for Abercrombie & Fitch, Versace, Clearasil, and Kérastase. She has been on the covers of numerous magazines, including Interview, Allure, Rolling Stone, Town & Country, The Hollywood Reporter, GQ, and W in the United States; Harper's Bazaar, Marie Claire, Tatler, Glamour and Red in the United Kingdom; Cosmopolitan in Germany; Grazia in Italy; and Tu Style in Italy.

=== Acting ===
Jones appears in the video "Love is Blind" from David Coverdale's 2000 album Into the Light and had supporting roles in Anger Management (2003), Love Actually (2003), and Dirty Dancing: Havana Nights (2004). She had a leading role in the made-for-TV film Love's Enduring Promise (2004) as a pioneer family's eldest child who falls in love with a mysterious man who saves her father's life. In 2005, she played a U.S. border guard's wife in the film The Three Burials of Melquiades Estrada, directed by and starring Tommy Lee Jones. She has said it was one of the most creative experiences of her career. In We Are Marshall (2006), she played Carol Dawson, wife of American football coach William "Red" Dawson. She also starred in Good Kill (2014), opposite Ethan Hawke.

Jones appeared in the AMC original television drama series Mad Men (2007–2015) for seven seasons as suburban housewife and mother Betty Draper. She received two Golden Globe nominations and one Emmy nomination for her performances.

Jones is also known for her role as Cadence Flaherty, the love interest of both Steve Stifler and Paul Finch in the 2003 comedy film American Wedding, the third installment of the American Pie film series. She played a con artist in the Law & Order episode "Quit Claim" who, as the lone surviving suspect connected to a real estate scam involving organized crime, frustrates the efforts of Assistant District Attorney Michael Cutter to convict her. She also appeared in The Boat That Rocked, a British film about offshore pirate radio in the 1960s, renamed Pirate Radio for North American release in 2009.

Jones was ranked 82nd on the Maxim Hot 100 Women of 2002. She appeared on the cover of "The Hot Issue" of British GQ magazine in May 2009. She appeared on the cover of the November 2009 issue of American GQ magazine, and has been a "topic" in the magazine several times. On November 14, 2009, Jones hosted an episode of Saturday Night Live with musical guest The Black Eyed Peas.

In 2011, Jones starred in two thriller films: Unknown and Seeking Justice. She portrayed Emma Frost in X-Men: First Class.

Jones appeared as Melissa Chartres in the Fox television comedy series The Last Man on Earth (2015–18). In 2019, she joined the cast of Netflix's comedy-drama series The Politician, playing bored, rich housewife Lizbeth Sloan. In 2020, Jones joined the cast of the Netflix series Spinning Out as Carol Baker, a former figure skater and single mother who has bipolar disorder. The series concluded after one season.

== Charity work ==
In 2009, Jones joined the marine conservation organization Oceana as a celebrity spokesperson, working to save endangered sharks and to inform others about sharks' vital importance in nature. She has gone swimming with sharks for a public service announcement for the group. She served food with fellow actress Malin Åkerman at the Los Angeles Mission's annual Thanksgiving event on November 24, 2021.

== Personal life ==
Jones dated Ashton Kutcher when they were both models for Abercrombie & Fitch in the late 1990s.

One of Jones's favorite actors is Robert Stack. During her relationship with Jim Carrey in 2002, Carrey gave her Stack's autograph as a birthday present.

She was in a relationship with singer Josh Groban from 2003 to 2006.

She dated actor Jason Sudeikis in 2010. In January 2011, People reported that they had split. In September 2011, she gave birth to a son whose father's identity was not publicly disclosed.

Jones has an interest in unsolved mysteries and believes she has seen a UFO. She has a tattoo that says "Bellatrix", the Latin word for female warrior.

In 2025, Jones disclosed that she has experienced misophonia since she was a teenager and that the condition has worsened over time.

== Filmography ==
=== Film ===
Key
†	Denotes works that have not yet been released

Year	Title	Role	Notes
1999	It's the Rage	Janice Taylor	
2001	The Glass House	Girl	
2001	North Hollywood	May	
2001	Bandits	Claire / Pink Boots	
2002	Taboo	Elizabeth	
2002	In My Life	Diane St. Croix	
2002	Full Frontal	Tracy	
2003	Anger Management	Gina	
2003	American Wedding	Cadence Flaherty	
2003	Love Actually	Jeannie	
2004	American Pie: Revealed	Herself	
2004	Love's Enduring Promise	Missie Davis	
2004	Dirty Dancing: Havana Nights	Eve	
2005	The Three Burials of Melquiades Estrada	Lou Ann Norton	
2006	Swedish Auto	Darla	
2006	We Are Marshall	Carole Dawson	
2007	The Making of 'Mad Men'	Herself	
2008	Establishing Mad Men	Herself	
2009	The Boat That Rocked	Elenore	
2011	Unknown	Elizabeth Harris	
2011	X-Men: First Class	Emma Frost	
2011	Seeking Justice	Laura Gerard	
2013	Sweetwater	Sarah Ramírez	
2014	Good Kill	Molly Egan	
2015	Unity	Narrator (voice)	Documentary film
2023	God Is a Bullet	Maureen Bacon	

=== Television ===
Year	Title	Role	Notes
1999	Get Real	Jane Cohen	Episode: "Pilot"
1999	Sorority	Number One	Pilot
2002	In My Life	Diane St. Croix	Pilot
2003	The New Tom Green Show	Herself	Guest
2003	Jimmy Kimmel Live!	Herself	Guest
2004	Love's Enduring Promise	Missie Davis	Television film
2005	Huff	Marisa Wells	Episodes: "The Good Doctor," "The Sample Closet"
2007–2015	Mad Men	Betty Draper	Main; 67 episodes
2008	Jimmy Kimmel Live!	Herself	2 episodes, Guest
2008	Law & Order	Kim Brody	Episode: "Quit Claim"
2009	Saturday Night Live	Herself (host)	Episode: "January Jones/Black Eyed Peas"
2010	Project Runway	Herself / Guest Judge	Episode: "A Rough Day On The Runway"
2014	The Tonight Show Starring Jimmy Fallon		
2015–2018	The Last Man on Earth	Melissa Chartres	63 episodes
2016	Watch What Happens Live with Andy Cohen	Herself	Guest
2016	Late Night with Seth Meyers	Herself	Guest
2017	Animals.	Diana (voice)	Episode: "Roaches"
2017	Return of the Mac	Herself	Episode: "New Kid on the Talk"
2019	The Politician	Lizbeth Sloan	3 episodes
2020	Spinning Out	Carol Baker	10 episodes

== Awards and nominations ==
Year	Association	Category	Project	Result	Ref.
2010	Primetime Emmy Award	Outstanding Lead Actress in a Drama Series	Mad Men (episode: "The Gypsy and the Hobo")	Nominated	
2008	Golden Globe Award	Best Actress – Television Series Drama	Mad Men (season 1)	Nominated	
2009	Golden Globe Award	Best Actress – Television Series Drama	Mad Men (season 2)	Nominated	
2007	Screen Actors Guild Awards	Outstanding Ensemble in a Drama Series	Mad Men (season 1)	Nominated	
2008	Screen Actors Guild Awards	Outstanding Ensemble in a Drama Series	Mad Men (season 2)	Won	
2009	Screen Actors Guild Awards	Outstanding Ensemble in a Drama Series	Mad Men (season 3)	Won	
2010	Screen Actors Guild Awards	Outstanding Ensemble in a Drama Series	Mad Men (season 4)	Nominated	
2015	Screen Actors Guild Awards	Outstanding Ensemble in a Drama Series	Mad Men (season 7)	Nominated	
