= Bridget Bedard =

American television writer and producer

Bridget Bedard is a television writer and producer who has garnered four Peabody Awards, a Golden Globe, both Writers and Producers Guild awards, as well as multiple Emmy and Golden Globe nominations.

== Life and career ==
Bridget Bedard grew up in Salt Lake City, Utah. She graduated from the University of Utah with a degree in Film Studies then earned her MFA in Directing from NYU Tisch School of the Arts. While at Tisch, Bedard received grants from the National Endowment of the Arts, Screen Gems Inc., The Wasserman Awards, and was named Best Female Student Director by the Directors Guild of America – East. Her thesis film, BABY, premiered at the Sundance Film Festival in 2001 and aired on the Sundance Channel and cable networks worldwide.

Bedard taught screenwriting and directing before making her television writing debut in 2007 on Mad Men, for which she won a Writers Guild of America Award for Best New Series and a Peabody. Following Mad Men, she was a writer and producer on Ray Romano's Men of a Certain Age, for which she also won a Peabody.

In 2014 Bridget teamed up with Joey Soloway as the head writer on the first season of the acclaimed series, Transparent, the success of which is often credited with the launch of Amazon Studios. She became an Executive Producer going into Season Three and took on the role of showrunner for Season Four. Transparent is the winner of eight Emmy Awards, two Golden Globes, one Peabody Award, a BAFTA, Critics Choice Award, Screen Actors Guild Award, and a Producers Guild of America Award.

In 2018, after four seasons of Transparent, Bridget signed an overall deal with Hulu where she was the showrunner on season one of A24's Ramy. The show was awarded the Audience award at SXSW in addition to being nominated for Breakthrough series at the Gotham Independent Film Awards and for three Golden Globes for its first season, winning one. She went on to sign an overall deal at Warner Media where she co-showran Love Life for two seasons. She is currently in an overall deal with HBO Max.

She resides in Los Angeles with her family.
