= Betty Draper =

Fictional character on American TV series "Mad Men"

- Mad Men character
- January Jones as Betty Draper
- First appearance: "Smoke Gets in Your Eyes" (2007)
- Last appearance: "Person to Person" (2015)
- Created by: Matthew Weiner
- Portrayed by: January Jones

In-universe information
- Full name: Elizabeth Hofstadt Francis
- Aliases: Elizabeth Hofstadt (maiden name); Elizabeth Draper (first married name); Elizabeth Francis (Second married name)
- Nicknames: Betty; Betts; Birdie
- Gender: Female
- Occupation: Housewife; Ex-model
- Family: Gene Hofstadt (deceased father); Ruth Hofstadt (deceased mother); William Hofstadt (brother); Gloria Hofstadt (step-mother)
- Spouses: Don Draper (m. 1953; div. 1964) Henry Francis (m. 1964)
- Children: Sally Draper (daughter with Don Draper); Robert Draper (son with Don Draper); Eugene Draper (son with Don Draper); Eleanor Francis (step-daughter from Henry Francis)
- Relatives: Judy Hofstadt (sister-in-law); Herman (deceased grandfather); Emma (deceased aunt)
- Nationality: American

Elizabeth "Betty" Draper Francis (formerly Draper, née Hofstadt) is a fictional character played by January Jones on AMC's television series Mad Men. She begins the show married to protagonist Don Draper (Jon Hamm); following a separation in the third season, the two remain divorced for the remainder of the series, but continue to share custody of their three children.

Blonde, beautiful, emotionally distant and immature, Betty spends the bulk of Mad Men slowly growing as a person amid the social and political turmoil of the 1960s. The character's appearance is often compared to that of Grace Kelly, with the similarities between the two also drawn during the first season of the series.

Jones received two Golden Globe nominations and a Primetime Emmy Award nomination for her performance. She also won the Screen Actors Guild Award for Outstanding Performance by an Ensemble in a Drama Series twice along with the cast of Mad Men.

== Casting and character development ==
The character of Betty Draper was not originally part of the pilot, though she did ultimately appear in the broadcast episode. The script established that lead character Don Draper (Jon Hamm) was married, but only through dialogue, with no intention to show his home life. January Jones was instead initially considered, along with Elisabeth Moss, for the character Peggy Olson; Moss was ultimately cast as Peggy. Show creator Matthew Weiner then wrote two scenes featuring Betty, and Jones successfully auditioned for the part two days later. Although there were no full scripts or even plot ideas involving the character at the time, Weiner promised Jones that the character would be developed.

Weiner has attributed Mad Men's visual style to the influence of film director Alfred Hitchcock, who featured a signature "icy blonde" female character in many of his films. Betty Draper's character has also been compared to that of Peyton Place's Constance MacKenzie: "cold, remote, and emotionally unavailable."

== Fictional character biography ==
=== Backstory ===
Betty was born Elizabeth Hofstadt in 1932. According to her son's birth certificate, she was born in Cape May, New Jersey, where her wealthy family summered. In season two the character is said to have been raised in the home rural Philadelphia suburb of Elkins Park, in Cheltenham Township. Betty is of German ancestry. Betty attended Bryn Mawr College, an exclusive Seven Sister college majoring in anthropology, after which she briefly modeled in Italy before moving to Manhattan. It was during this time that she met Don Draper: he was writing ad copy for a fur company, and she was one of their models. He began courting her by buying her the fur coat she wore at a shoot. Betty and Don were married in May 1953. Betty's mother Ruth died early in 1960, three months before the events of the episode "Ladies Room". Her father, Gene (Ryan Cutrona), has a girlfriend named Gloria (Darcy Shean), whom Betty dislikes and whom her father marries sometime in the 18 months between seasons 1 and 2; Gloria leaves Gene when he begins showing signs of mental deterioration in Season 3. He moved in with the Drapers during season 3 and later died in that season, set in 1963. Betty has a brother, William (Eric Ladin), who is married to Judy (Megan Henning) and whose daughters Don and Betty consider to be "rowdy." Betty's confidantes have included her neighbor Francine Hanson (Anne Dudek) and Glen Bishop (Marten Holden Weiner), the young son of divorcée Helen Bishop (Darby Stanchfield). Ill-suited for parenting, Betty has a strained relationship with her children, particularly with her daughter Sally (Kiernan Shipka).

=== Season one ===
Betty and Don Draper live in a large house in suburban Ossining, New York, with their children Sally and Bobby (Maxwell Huckabee). In the second episode, set in the spring of 1960, Betty starts to see a psychiatrist to address repeated spells of numbness in her hands, which medical doctors have indicated are psychosomatic. It was during these meetings that, after having discovered the psychiatrist was giving reports of her sessions to Don, she voiced her suspicion that her husband was unfaithful. By the start of the second season, set in February 1962, she had discontinued the consultations.

=== Season two ===
During the second-season episode "A Night to Remember", Betty and Don seem to have reached an agreement, but after a dinner party where Betty is embarrassed to be considered a "demographic" by Don and his associates, she confronts her husband for the first time about his adultery, specifically with Bobbie Barrett (Melinda McGraw). Don, however, denies having an affair. The next day, with a glass of wine in hand, Betty searches through Don's belongings for proof of his indiscretions but does not find any. Betty awakens Don - who is sleeping on the couch - that night and explains that she doesn't want things to "be like this." He repeats that he did not do anything, and when she asks if he hates her, he insists that he loves her and doesn't want to "lose this." When preparing dinner the next day, an Utz commercial featuring Jimmy Barrett (Patrick Fischler) airs on television, reminding Betty of Don's infidelity. After seeing this, Betty calls Don at work and tells him she doesn't want him to come home.

Betty does turn to Don when she learns her father has suffered a stroke. She and Don leave the children with a neighbor and drive to visit Gene. Betty is visibly impatient with Gloria and William, but she and Don are careful to present a united front. At the end of a stressful day, Betty makes Don sleep on the floor of the guestroom, but later joins him on the floor, where they have sex. The next morning, Gene mistakes Betty for her late mother Ruth, suggesting they "go upstairs." Betty is shocked and frightened, but tries to pretend that everything is all right. When she and Don return to New York, Betty surprises Don by asking him to leave again.

In the Season 2 finale, Betty discovers she is pregnant. Although she brings up the subject of abortion with her doctor and has sex with a random man she picks up at a bar at the height of the Cuban Missile Crisis, at the end of the episode she asks Don to return home, and tells him she is pregnant.

=== Season three ===
Season 3 begins with Betty in her third trimester, seemingly reconciled with Don. In Episode 5, she gives birth to Eugene Scott Draper, whom she names after her father. After giving birth, Betty comes to the quick realization that her dream of everything being perfect will never come true.

During Episode 3, Betty and Don attend a country club party hosted by Roger Sterling (John Slattery) and his new wife, Jane Siegel Sterling (Peyton List), where Betty meets Henry Francis (Christopher Stanley), who is later revealed to be an advisor to then-New York governor Nelson A. Rockefeller. She later calls on behalf of the Junior League of Tarrytown to ask if he will stop the destruction of the Pleasantville Road Reservoir. Henry is infatuated with Betty, and though she seems reluctant to return his feelings at first, as the season progresses, their affair intensifies. Betty eventually ends it, feeling guilty.

In Episode 11, Betty corners Don, after getting into a locked drawer in the desk in his home office that contains pictures and documents of Don's past life. (Don had inadvertently left his keys in his clothes, and Betty heard them jingling in the dryer). She forces him to give her an explanation, and he haltingly tells her about his life as Dick Whitman, how he came to exchange dog tags with Lieutenant Don Draper, and his half-brother Adam's (Jay Paulson) suicide. While apparently sympathetic to his feelings of guilt about Adam's death, Betty is conflicted about Don's having hidden this aspect of his life from her.

After President John F. Kennedy's assassination and Margaret Sterling's (Elizabeth Rice) wedding the following day, Betty meets with Henry, who confesses his desire to marry her. They passionately kiss, and after the encounter, Betty returns home to tell Don she no longer loves him, leaving him stunned. This culminates in her seeing a divorce lawyer in the season 3 finale. During the same episode, Roger, whose daughter is friends with Henry's daughter, unintentionally reveals to Don that Betty and Henry are involved. An incensed Don confronts Betty. After calling her a whore, he assures her that she "won't get a nickel" in the ensuing divorce, and he intends to seek sole custody of the children. The next morning, Don and Betty inform the children they are separating, and both older children react badly.

After moving into Sterling Cooper Draper Pryce's new office, Don calls Betty and tells her he will not fight her, and he wishes her the best. She tells him he'll always be their children's father. The season ends with Betty taking a plane to Reno with baby Gene and Henry.

=== Season four ===
Betty's presence in season four is diminished compared to the previous seasons. Season 4 opens with Betty, Henry, and the children still living in the former Draper residence (which Don owns) following Betty's marriage to Henry. The residence is a point of contention for Don and Betty, as Don is still paying the mortgage, and Betty is required by their divorce agreement to move out but has not.

Throughout Season 4, Betty finds her marriage to Henry strained by tensions with Don and by deteriorating relations with Sally. When she discovers Sally has become friends with her old confidant, Glen Bishop, Betty forces them to end the friendship. Glen's reappearance is the catalyst for Betty to finally insist to Henry that it's time for them to move because of the "low-caliber people" taking over the neighborhood, much to Sally's distress.

In the season finale "Tomorrowland", Betty and Francis are packing to move out of the Ossining house and into a new home in nearby Rye, New York. When the children's nanny, Carla (Deborah Lacey), lets Glen into the house to say goodbye to Sally, Betty becomes upset and fires her, refusing to give her a reference. This angers Henry, with whom Betty feels increasingly dissatisfied. At the end of the episode Betty waits for Don at the now-empty Ossining house, telling him she is unhappy with her new life. Don senses her desire to try to repair things between them, but instead informs her of his engagement to Megan Calvet (Jessica Paré). Betty congratulates him, but is visibly disheartened and angry that he has moved on. They leave the house through opposite doors.

=== Season five ===
Betty's presence in season five is further reduced because of January Jones' pregnancy. In the episode, "Tea Leaves", Betty and her family are now shown to be living in a large Victorian estate in Rye, New York. Since the season four finale, she has put on a significant amount of weight and dislikes leaving the house. Her mother-in-law, Pauline (Pamela Dunlap), advises Betty to take diet pills since Pauline believes Henry is unhappy in the marriage, even though he repeatedly tells Betty that he loves her regardless of her appearance. Betty goes to her doctor to get a prescription, but he finds a lump in her throat that could be cancerous. When it turns out to be benign, Betty is barely relieved and returns to focusing on her physical condition. By the episode "Dark Shadows", Betty attends Weight Watchers meetings to attempt to regain her old form but receives mixed results; she notes that it is difficult to take the weight off. Betty is often seen eating very little in an attempt to lose weight but appears to weaken when she consumes whipped cream directly from the can and occasionally sneaks sweets. Betty regresses further when she goes to Don's NYC apartment to pick up her kids and becomes jealous and bitter over the lovely, modern accommodations and Megan's lissome beauty. She then tries to stir up rancor by mentioning Don's deceased friend Anna Draper (Melinda Page Hamilton) to Sally, but after Megan and (particularly) Don tell Sally more about Anna, Betty is defeated; Sally expresses visible contempt for her mother, further straining their relationship. However, when Sally begins menstruating for the first time while visiting her father in New York, she immediately returns to Rye and seeks out her mother for help. Here, Betty is finally shown to be a caring mother to Sally; showing what is at this point uncharacteristic warmth, Betty recognizes that Sally needs her and provides comfort and guidance to her daughter.

=== Season six ===
Betty spends most of the beginning of the sixth season losing the weight she gained over the past year. After visiting the Lower East Side in search of one of Sally's friends and being snidely dismissed by one of the young people there as a "bottle blonde", she dyes her hair brunette. Betty's hair later reverts to its original blonde color. When Henry announces that he wants to run for public office, she has mixed feelings about the idea (still being concerned about her weight).

In episode 8 ("The Better Half"), Betty is back to her original weight and actively campaigning alongside her husband. Henry sees the excess attention that Betty receives and is turned on by it, as is Betty, who is beginning to feel more confident about herself. When one of Henry's colleagues makes a pass at her at a fundraising dinner, she informs him that she's had three children, to which he replies that he doesn't care. But he's misunderstood her meaning; she then tells him triumphantly, "No, look at me. Can you believe I've had three children?" before leaving with Henry.

Betty goes to Bobby's summer camp for a family weekend in "The Better Half", driving down without Henry. Don, also on his way to the camp, sees the newly svelte Betty lost at a gas station, and they go down to the campground together. They spend the afternoon with Bobby, and everyone has a wonderful time. That night Don visits Betty's cabin, and they share a drink, reminiscing about the early years of their marriage and the kids. Don accepts Betty's tacit invitation to enter her cabin, and they have sex. Betty and Don talk afterward, and Betty admits that she's happy with Henry, is no longer as mad at Don as she once was, and feels sorry for Megan, who doesn't know that loving Don is the worst way of getting to him. The next morning Don wakes up alone and goes down to the cafeteria, where he sees Betty and Henry eating together. Don says hello to them and goes off to eat, alone, at the other side of the room.

In "The Quality of Mercy", Betty takes Sally on an overnight trip to interview at Miss Porter's boarding school. She detects Sally is troubled by something but doesn't realize it's because Sally saw Don in bed with his downstairs neighbor, Sylvia Rosen (Linda Cardellini). Sally is accepted at Miss Porter's, but Betty soon calls Don with the news that Sally has gotten suspended because she bought beer with a fake I.D. and got drunk with some other girls. Betty sadly blames herself for Sally's troubles and tells Don, "the good isn't beating out the bad."

=== Season seven ===
In episode 3, "Field Trip," the distinctly un-maternal Betty questions if she is a good mother, and if her children love her, after a field trip with Bobby to a farm goes sour. Bobby trades Betty's sandwich for a bag of gumdrops, leaving Betty with no food. Betty orders Bobby to eat the candy and is visibly irritated with him for the rest of the day. When they return home, neither is willing to talk about what happened. Henry insists that the children love her, but Betty believes it will change in time.

In episode 5, "Runaways", Betty speaks her mind about the Vietnam War during a dinner party, causing tension with the more circumspect Henry. Bobby overhears the arguing and sees Henry sleeping in the den. When Sally comes home after getting hurt faux sword-fighting at Miss Porter's, Bobby asks her if Betty and Henry are getting a divorce. Sally assures him they aren't, and Bobby tells her he wishes he could go with her to school. At the end of the episode, Betty resents Henry for telling her what to do, say, and think.

In episode 9, "New Business," Betty is revealed to be pursuing a master's degree in psychology at Fairfield University in Connecticut.

In episode 13, "The Milk and Honey Route," Betty begins to feel dizzy and winded at school and falls down while climbing the stairs, fracturing her rib. When she sees her doctor, Betty is shocked to discover that her recent lightheadedness is a sign of aggressive, advanced lung cancer that has begun to spread throughout her body. Both Henry and Sally pressure her to undergo chemotherapy, but she stoically refuses, saying "I've learned to believe people when they say it's over." She writes a letter to Sally, telling her in a matter-of-fact way how she wants to be dressed and made up for her funeral, and then stating: "Sally, I always worried about you because you marched to the beat of your own drum, but now I know that's good. I know your life will be an adventure. I love you, Mom."

In the series finale, "Person to Person," Betty insists to Don (and apparently to Henry) that her children should live with her brother William and his wife after her death, so that the boys will have a woman in their lives. Betty is last seen reading a newspaper at her kitchen table while smoking a cigarette, as Sally is in the background, washing dishes.

== Reception ==
Betty Draper appeared in Comcast's list of TV's Most Intriguing Characters. TV Guide named her one of the most fashionable TV characters. She was also included in Glamour's list of the 12 Most Stylish TV Characters. While the characterization of Betty Draper won highly positive reviews in the early Mad Men seasons, she proved to be particularly divisive in the later Mad Men seasons. HuffPost named her as one of the Worst TV Characters in 2012, saying "her unchanging narcissism and her selfish petulance simply bore us to tears". However, her role on the show received more positive reviews in season 6, with critics highlighting Jones's performance in the episode "The Better Half" as a season highlight. January Jones won critical acclaim for her performance as Betty in the final episodes of the seventh season, particularly in the episodes "The Milk and Honey Route" and the series finale, "Person to Person" (2015), with critics highlighting her increased prominence and character development. In the years following the finale, Betty has been mentioned as one of Mad Men's best characters, with critics highlighting her character development and overall arc.

Betty has been considered an embodiment of “the problem that has no name” chronicled in the seminal 1963 feminist book The Feminine Mystique by Betty Friedan. The book examined the epidemic of unhappiness and dissatisfaction experienced by many upper middle class housewives in the 1960s (like Betty) due to their inability to form their own identity and life outside the home. This cultural phenomenon is explored in the series through Betty, who, unlike female characters such as Peggy and Joan, is trapped and "exiled from the career world" due to her upbringing, social class, education, and marital status.

=== Awards and nominations ===
January Jones earned nominations and accolades for her portrayal of Betty Draper. She was jointly nominated on six occasions for the Screen Actors Guild Award for Outstanding Performance by an Ensemble in a Drama Series, in 2008, 2009, 2010, 2011, 2013, and 2015, winning twice in 2009 and 2010. In 2009 and 2010, Jones was nominated for the Golden Globe Award for Best Actress – Television Series (Drama). In 2010, Jones was nominated for the Primetime Emmy Award for Outstanding Lead Actress in a Drama Series.
