= John Slattery =

American actor and director (born 1962)

- Slattery in 2026
- Born: John M. Slattery Jr. August 13, 1962 (age 64); Boston, Massachusetts, U.S.
- Education: Catholic University (BFA)
- Occupations: Actor, director
- Years active: 1988–present
- Spouse: Talia Balsam (m. 1998)
- Children: 1

John M. Slattery Jr. (born August 13, 1962) is an American actor and director. He is known for his role as Roger Sterling in the AMC drama series Mad Men (2007–15), for which he was nominated for four Primetime Emmy Awards for Outstanding Supporting Actor in a Drama Series, along with winning two Critics' Choice Television Awards and two Screen Actors Guild Awards.

He is also known for his film roles including for his portrayal of Ben Bradlee, Jr., in the Best Picture-winning film Spotlight (2015), and the role of Howard Stark in the Marvel Cinematic Universe films Iron Man 2 (2010), Ant-Man (2015), Captain America: Civil War (2016), and Avengers: Endgame (2019). He has also acted in Flags of Our Fathers (2006), Reservation Road (2007), Charlie Wilson's War (2007), The Adjustment Bureau (2011), Churchill (2017), Confess, Fletch (2022), and Nuremberg (2025). Slattery made his directorial film debut with God's Pocket (2014).

Slattery's lead television roles include Homefront (1991–1993), Maggie (1998–1999), Jack & Bobby (2004–2005), and neXt (2020). He has also had recurring roles in shows such as Desperate Housewives (2004–2007), 30 Rock (2010), Arrested Development (2013), Wet Hot American Summer: First Day of Camp (2015), Veep (2016), Modern Love (2019), Mrs. America (2020), and The Good Fight (2022).

== Early life and education ==
Slattery was born in Boston, Massachusetts, to Joan (née Mulhern), a retired accountant, and John "Jack" Slattery, a leather merchant. He is one of six children. As a young boy, he dreamed of being a baseball player.

Slattery is of Irish descent and was raised Catholic. He attended high school at Saint Sebastian's School in Newton, Massachusetts (since relocated to Needham, Massachusetts), and received a Bachelor of Fine Arts from the Catholic University of America in 1984.

== Career ==
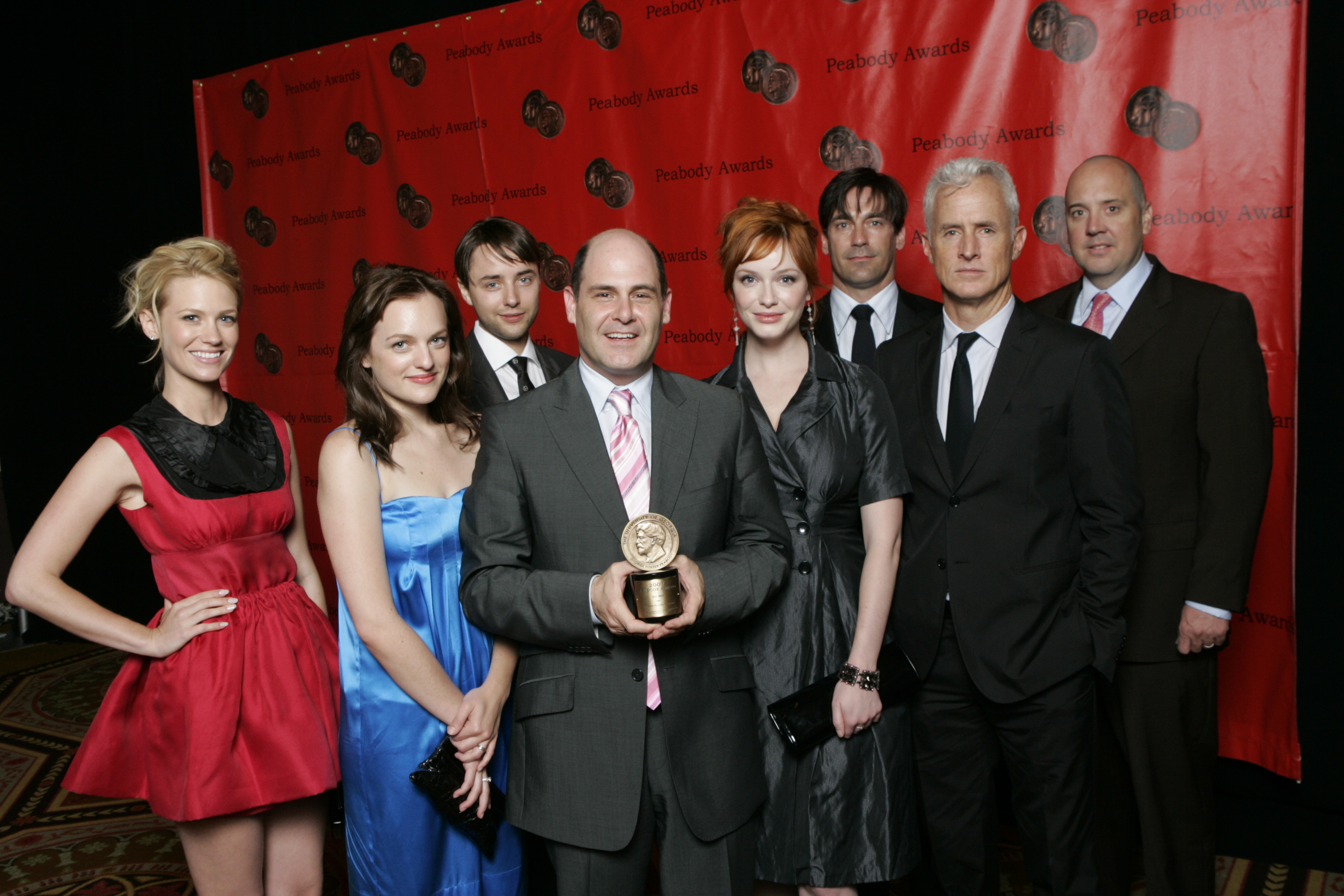
Slattery (second from right) with Mad Men co-stars and creator Matthew Weiner at the 2008 Peabody Awards

=== Film and television ===
Apart from his role on Mad Men, Slattery has had roles such as union organizer Al Kahn on Homefront; Senator Walter Mondale in the HBO miniseries From the Earth to the Moon; as political adviser Tommy Flannigan in the HBO series K Street; guest appearances as Will Truman's brother Sam on Will & Grace; as Michael Cassidy, Amy's estranged husband, on Judging Amy; politician Bill Kelley on Sex and the City; principal Dennis Martino on Ed; and college president Peter Benedict on Jack and Bobby. In March 2007, he began a series of appearances on Desperate Housewives portraying Victor Lang, Gabrielle Solis's (Eva Longoria) second husband, until his character's death in Season 4. In December 2009, Slattery appeared on The Colbert Report in a faux commercial advertising gold.

Slattery played Paul Moore, boyfriend of Katherine Watson (portrayed by Julia Roberts) in the film Mona Lisa Smile, and he portrayed Howie in David Lindsay-Abaire's play, Rabbit Hole. He had a small part as a teacher in the film Sleepers. He also appeared as a government promoter in the Clint Eastwood feature Flags of our Fathers and as CIA official Henry Cravely in Charlie Wilson's War. He was cast as Bert Miller, father of the leading female character, in Dirty Dancing: Havana Nights, and in The Adjustment Bureau played Richardson, a mid-level agent in the mysterious paranormal agency called the Bureau. Slattery narrates the audiobook versions of Don DeLillo's 2007 novel Falling Man, Stephen King's 2008 psychological horror novel Duma Key, and Ernest Hemingway's 1929 novel A Farewell to Arms.

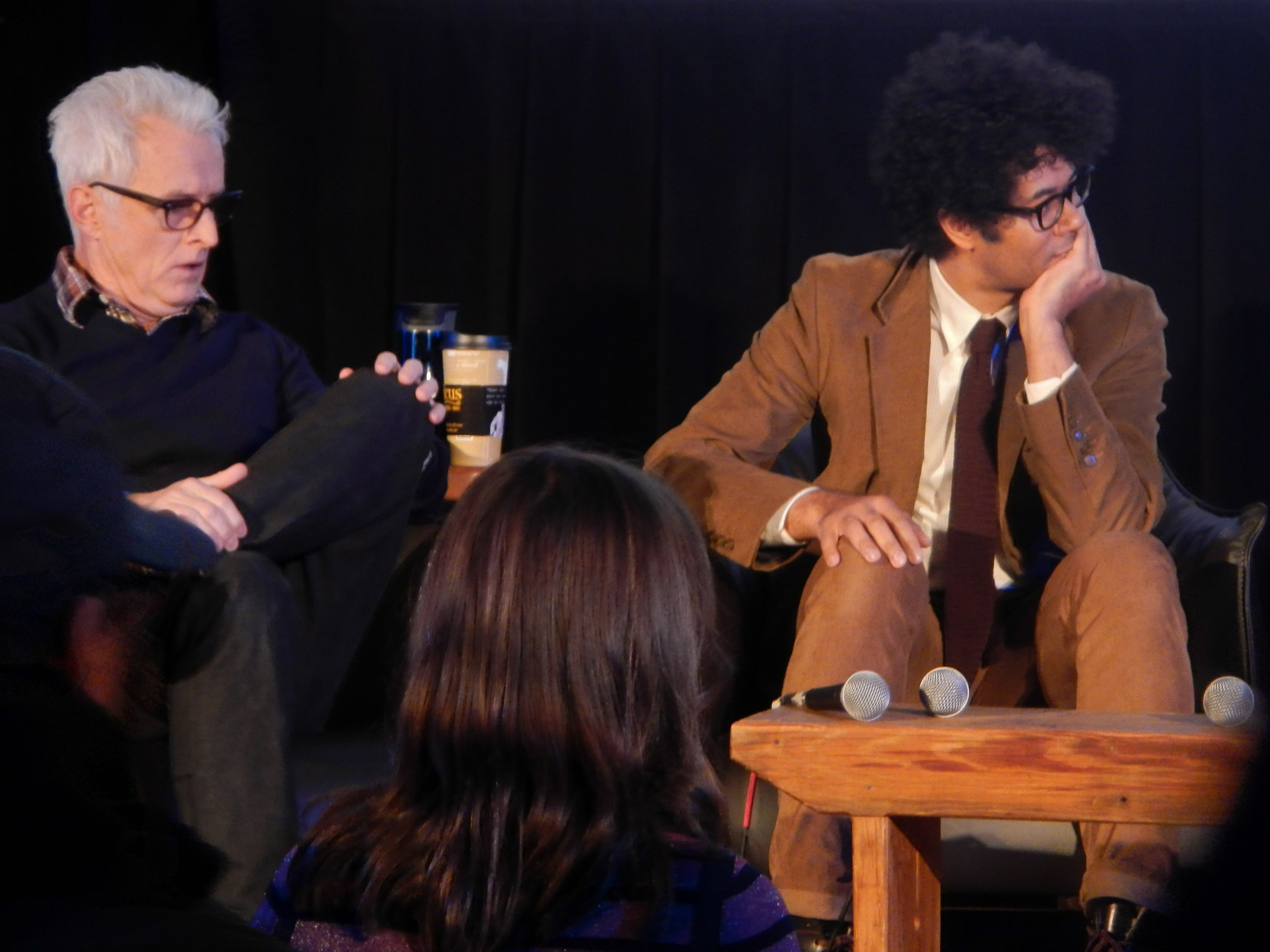
Slattery (left) at the 2014 Sundance Film Festival discussing his directorial debut God's Pocket

In 2013, Slattery directed his first feature film, God's Pocket (2014), which he co-wrote with Alex Metcalf. The film, based on a 1983 novel of the same name by Pete Dexter, premiered at the 2014 Sundance Film Festival and was picked up for distribution by IFC Films.

In 2015, Slattery portrayed journalist Ben Bradlee Jr. in the Academy Award-winning, Golden Globe-nominated drama film Spotlight, and also appeared in the Netflix comedy series Wet Hot American Summer: First Day of Camp, for which he earned a nomination for the Critics' Choice Television Award for Best Guest Performer in a Comedy Series.

In 2025, Slattery portrayed Burton C. Andrus, the commandant of the prison housing Nazi war criminals being held for the post-World War II Nuremberg war crimes trials in the movie Nuremberg.

=== Theater ===
Slattery's stage performances have included Laughter on the 23rd Floor, Betrayal, Rabbit Hole and The Front Page on Broadway, and The Lisbon Traviata and Three Days of Rain off-Broadway.

== Personal life ==
Slattery married actress Talia Balsam in 1998 (who also played his screen wife, Mona, in Mad Men). They have one son together. They live in SoHo, Manhattan.

== Filmography ==
=== Film ===
Year	Title	Role	Notes
1996	City Hall	Detective George	
1996	Eraser	FBI Agent Corman	
1996	Sleepers	Rob Carlson	
1997	My Brother's War	Devlin	
1997	Red Meat	Stefan	
1998	Harvest	Sheriff Johnson	
1998	The Naked Man	Ferris	
1998	Where's Marlowe?	Kevin Murphy	
2000	Traffic	ADA Dan Collier	
2001	Sam the Man	Maxwell Slade	
2002	Bad Company	Roland Yates	
2003	The Station Agent	David	
2003	Mona Lisa Smile	Paul Moore	
2004	Noise	Detective Rutherford	
2004	Dirty Dancing: Havana Nights	Bert Miller	
2006	The Situation	Colonel Carrick	
2006	Flags of Our Fathers	Bud Gerber	
2007	Underdog	Mayor	
2007	Reservation Road	Steve Cutter	
2007	Charlie Wilson's War	CIA Director Henry Cravely	
2010	Iron Man 2	Howard Stark	
2011	The Adjustment Bureau	Richardson	
2011	Return	Bud	
2012	In Our Nature	Gil	
2013	Bluebird	Richard	
2014	God's Pocket	—N/a	Directorial debut; also co-writer
2015	Ted 2	Shep Wild	
2015	Ant-Man	Howard Stark	Cameo
2015	Spotlight	Ben Bradlee Jr.	
2016	Captain America: Civil War	Howard Stark	
2017	Churchill	Dwight D. Eisenhower	
2019	Avengers: Endgame	Howard Stark	
2022	Confess, Fletch	Frank Jaffe	
2023	Maggie Moore(s)	—N/a	Director
2024	Unfrosted	Roger Sterling	
2025	Nuremberg	Col. Burton C. Andrus	
2026	Gail Daughtry and the Celebrity Sex Pass	Himself	Completed

=== Television ===
Year	Title	Role	Notes
1988	Dirty Dozen: The Series	Pvt. Dylan Leeds	7 episodes
1989	Father Dowling Mysteries	Doug	Episode: "The Man Who Came to Dinner Mystery"
1991	Under Cover	Graham Parker	13 episodes
1991	Under Cover	Graham Parker	Television movie
1991	Before the Storm	Graham Parker	Television movie
1991	China Beach	Dr. Bob	Episode: "Hello Goodbye"
1991–93	Homefront	Al Kahn	Main role, 38 episodes
1995	A Woman of Independent Means	Dwight	Miniseries; uncredited
1995	Ned and Stacey	Sam	Episode: "Threesome"
1996	Lily Dale	Will Kidder	Television movie
1997	Feds	Michael Mancini	Episode: "Smoking Gun"
1998	From the Earth to the Moon	Walter Mondale	Episode: "Apollo One"
1998	Party of Five	Jay Mott	2 episodes
1998	Becker	Peter	Episode: "Man Plans, God Laughs"
1998–99	Maggie	Dr. Richard Meyers	Main role, 11 episodes
1998	Law & Order	Arlen Levitt	Episode: "Tabloid"
1999	Will & Grace	Sam Truman	2 episodes
1999–2000	Judging Amy	Michael Cassidy	3 episodes
2000	Sex and the City	Bill Kelley	2 episodes
2000	Law & Order	Dr. Richard Shipman	Episode: "Stiff"
2001–02	Ed	Dennis Martino	Recurring role, 17 episodes
2002	A Death in the Family	Jay Follett	Television movie
2003	K Street	Tommy Flannegan	10 episodes
2004	The Brooke Ellison Story	Ed Ellison	Television movie
2004–05	Jack & Bobby	Peter Benedict	Main role, 21 episodes
2007	Desperate Housewives	Victor Lang	Recurring role, 14 episodes
2007–15	Mad Men	Roger Sterling	Main role, 85 episodes Also directed 5 episodes
2009	The Colbert Report	John Slattery	Episode: "Alicia Keys"
2010	30 Rock	Steven Austin	Episode: "Brooklyn Without Limits"
2011	The Simpsons	Robert Marlowe (voice)	Episode: "The Man in the Blue Flannel Pants"
2011–12	The Cleveland Show	Mayor Larry Box (voice)	4 episodes
2013	Arrested Development	Dr. Norman	2 episodes
2015	Wet Hot American Summer: First Day of Camp	Claude Dumet	6 episodes
2015	The Daily Show with Jon Stewart	Sandwich Man	Episode: Gayle Tzemach Lemmon
2015	Documentary Now!	William H. Sebastian	Episode: "Kunuk Uncovered"
2016	Veep	Charlie Baird	6 episodes
2016–2017	Love	—N/a	Director; 3 episodes
2018	The Romanoffs	Daniel Reese	2 episodes
2019	Modern Love	Dennis	2 episodes
2020	Mrs. America	Fred Schlafly	Miniseries; 7 episodes
2020	neXt	Paul LeBlanc	Main role
2021	Girls5eva	Himself	Episode: "Alf Musik"
2021	Santa Inc.	Larson (voice)	3 episodes
2022	The Good Fight	Dr. Lyle Bettencourt	9 episodes
2023	What We Do in the Shadows	Himself	Episode: Urgent Care
2023	What If...?	Howard Stark (voice)	Episode: "What If... Peter Quill Attacked Earth's Mightiest Heroes?"
2025	Harley Quinn	Floronic Man / Jason Woodrue (voice)	2 episodes
2025	The Last Frontier	Senior CIA Official	Recurring role
2025–present	The Rainmaker	Leo F. Drummond	Main role
2026	Vladimir	John	8 episodes
TBA	The Best of Us	James Leavitt	

=== Theater ===
Year	Title	Role	Venue	Ref.
1989	The Lisbon Traviata	Paul	Off-Broadway	
1990	Mi Vida Loca	Paco	Off-Broadway	
1992	The Extra Man	Daniel	Off-Broadway	
1993	Laughter on the 23rd Floor	Kenny	Richard Rodgers Theatre, Broadway	
1995	Night and Her Stars	Charles Van Doren	The American Place Theatre, Off-Broadway	
1997	Three Days of Rain	Walker/Ned	New York City Center, Off-Broadway	
2000	Betrayal	Robert	American Airlines Theatre, Broadway	
2006	Rabbit Hole	Howie	Biltmore Theatre, Broadway	
2016	The Front Page	Hildy Johnson	Broadhurst Theatre, Broadway	

=== Video game ===
Year	Title	Voice role	Notes
2012	Dishonored	Admiral Havelock	

=== Music videos ===
Year	Title	Artist(s)	Role	Ref.
2010	Conversation 16	The National	Secret Service Agent	

== Awards and nominations ==
Organizations	Year	Category	Work	Result	Ref.
Critics' Choice Television Award	2011	Best Supporting Actor in a Drama Series	Mad Men (season 4)	Nominated	
Critics' Choice Television Award	2012	Best Supporting Actor in a Drama Series	Mad Men (season 5)	Nominated	
Critics' Choice Television Award	2016	Best Guest Performer in a Comedy Series	Wet Hot American Summer: First Day of Camp	Nominated	
Gotham Independent Film Award	2015	Ensemble Performance	Spotlight	Won	
Independent Spirit Award	2015	Robert Altman Award	Spotlight	Honored	
Primetime Emmy Award	2008	Outstanding Supporting Actor in a Drama Series	Mad Men (episode: "Long Weekend")	Nominated	
Primetime Emmy Award	2009	Outstanding Supporting Actor in a Drama Series	Mad Men (episode: "Six Month Leave")	Nominated	
Primetime Emmy Award	2010	Outstanding Supporting Actor in a Drama Series	Mad Men (episode: "The Gypsy and the Hobo")	Nominated	
Primetime Emmy Award	2011	Outstanding Supporting Actor in a Drama Series	Mad Men (episode: "Hands and Knees")	Nominated	
Satellite Award	2015	Best Cast in a Motion Picture	Spotlight	Won	
Screen Actors Guild Award	2007	Outstanding Ensemble in a Comedy Series	Desperate Housewives (season 4)	Nominated	
Screen Actors Guild Award	2007	Outstanding Ensemble in a Drama Series	Mad Men (season 1)	Nominated	
Screen Actors Guild Award	2008	Outstanding Ensemble in a Drama Series	Mad Men (season 2)	Won	
Screen Actors Guild Award	2009	Outstanding Ensemble in a Drama Series	Mad Men (season 3)	Won	
Screen Actors Guild Award	2010	Outstanding Ensemble in a Drama Series	Mad Men (season 4)	Nominated	
Screen Actors Guild Award	2012	Outstanding Ensemble in a Drama Series	Mad Men (season 5)	Nominated	
Screen Actors Guild Award	2015	Outstanding Ensemble in a Drama Series	Mad Men (season 7)	Nominated	
Screen Actors Guild Award	2015	Outstanding Cast in a Motion Picture	Spotlight	Won	
Screen Actors Guild Award	2016	Outstanding Ensemble in a Comedy Series	Veep (season 5)	Nominated	
