= Don Draper =

Fictional character on American TV show "Mad Men"

- Mad Men character
- Jon Hamm as Don Draper
- First appearance: "Smoke Gets in Your Eyes" (2007)
- Last appearance: "Person to Person" (2015)
- Created by: Matthew Weiner
- Portrayed by: Jon Hamm; Brandon Killham (Young Dick Whitman); Troy Ruptash (Lieutenant Donald Draper)

In-universe information
- Full name: Donald Francis Draper
- Occupation: Advertising executive
- Affiliation: Sterling Cooper
- Family: Archie Whitman (father); Abigail Whitman (adoptive mother); Evangeline (mother); Adam Whitman (half-brother)
- Spouses: Betty Hofstadt (m. 1953; div. 1964) Megan Calvet (m. 1965; div. 1970)
- Children: Sally Draper; Robert Draper; Eugene Draper
- Nationality: American

Donald Francis "Don" Draper, born Richard "Dick" Whitman, is a fictional character and the protagonist of the AMC television series Mad Men (2007–2015), portrayed by Jon Hamm. At the beginning of the series, Draper is the charismatic yet enigmatic creative director at the fictional Manhattan advertising firm Sterling Cooper. In spite of his success, he is plagued by several personal problems, including the issues of identity and social alienation, in part due to his difficult past. His personal and professional developments in the show are frequently situated against the larger social, political, and economic events of the 1960s.

The character of Don Draper is partially inspired by Draper Daniels, a creative director at Leo Burnett advertising agency in Chicago in the 1950s, who worked on the Marlboro Man campaign; and by Bill Backer, an advertising executive at McCann Erickson who created the "I'd Like to Buy the World a Coke" ad in 1971. Don Draper is widely regarded as one of the greatest characters in television history, and Jon Hamm received universal acclaim for his performance.

== Biography ==
Donald Francis Draper is revealed through flashbacks to be the assumed identity of Richard "Dick" Whitman, born in Bunbury, Illinois, in May 1926 to Evangeline (Kelly Huddleston), a prostitute, and an abusive, alcoholic farmer, Archibald "Archie" Whitman (Joseph Culp). His mother Evangeline died in labor, and the midwife brought the baby to be raised by Archie and his wife, Abigail.

When he was 10 years old, Dick saw his father Archie die after being kicked by a spooked horse. He began to suffer from croup and was left under the care of a prostitute named Aimée (Megan Ferguson). She took his virginity in a way that creator Matthew Weiner stated concerned "his relationship to sex and molestation", and reviewer Abigail Rine described more directly as rape.

Dick Whitman briefly served in the Korean War, where he was injured in a gasoline explosion where his commanding officer, Lieutenant Donald Draper, was killed. Dick switched dog tags with the unidentifiable body of Lieutenant Draper and assumed his identity, thus reinventing himself as Don Draper.

The new Don Draper relocated to New York City, where he worked as a fur salesman and attended City College at night. With the support of his boss, he wrote advertising copy for the fur company, helping him build a portfolio along with some spec ads. At this job in 1953 Draper met his future wife, Elizabeth "Betty" Hofstadt (January Jones), a model who was photographed for one of his own ads. After meeting Roger Sterling at the fur store and a subsequent boozy lunch meeting, Draper assumed a job at Sterling Cooper, where he eventually became creative director.

He was considered a major asset to the company, as he had considerable talent for understanding the desires of others and for effectively pitching and selling ideas. Because of this, he was occasionally courted by other advertising firms. Although he kept his true identity heavily guarded, almost everyone at the firm was portrayed as respecting his talent. At the same time, many in the firm were also troubled by Draper's erratic behavior.

His marriage was rocky, with Draper having numerous affairs. Betty filed for divorce in 1964 after she discovered his true identity; Betty later married Republican political operative Henry Francis (Christopher Stanley). As his marriage was ending, Draper also left Sterling Cooper due to its impending sale to McCann Erickson, becoming a name partner in the new firm Sterling Cooper Draper Pryce. After his divorce and Betty's remarriage, Draper began to grow increasingly dependent on alcohol. He entered a relationship with a colleague, Dr. Faye Miller, but eventually married his secretary, aspiring actress Megan Calvet (Jessica Paré). In the summer of 1966 they moved to a stylish apartment on Park Avenue in the Upper East Side. His marriage to Megan lasted until 1970.

By 1968, Draper's alcoholism and mental health struggles led to an increase in erratic behavior, leading to a mandatory leave of absence from SCDP after he cost them a major client. After spending a year without work and attempting sobriety, Draper returned to SCDP (now known as "Sterling Cooper and Partners" after a merger with rival firm Cutler, Gleason and Chaough) in 1969, slowly regaining the trust of his colleagues. When SC&P was taken over by McCann in 1970, Draper abruptly walked out of the agency in the middle of a meeting and embarked on a nomadic existence as a mechanic over the course of several months. In the series' final episode, "Person to Person", Draper went on a retreat to the Esalen Institute with Anna's niece Stephanie (Caity Lotz). In the last scene of the series, Draper sits and meditates, with a smile on his face. His ultimate fate is left ambiguous: In their reviews of the final episode, some critics said that the episode's final shot—the iconic 1971 "I'd Like to Buy the World a Coke" ad, produced by McCann Erickson—implied that the episode did not provide a definite ending to Draper's story, while others noted that Peggy's last conversation with Don was a phone call inviting him to work with her on a new client she just landed, Coca-Cola, suggests Draper returned to advertising and created that commercial.

== Reception ==
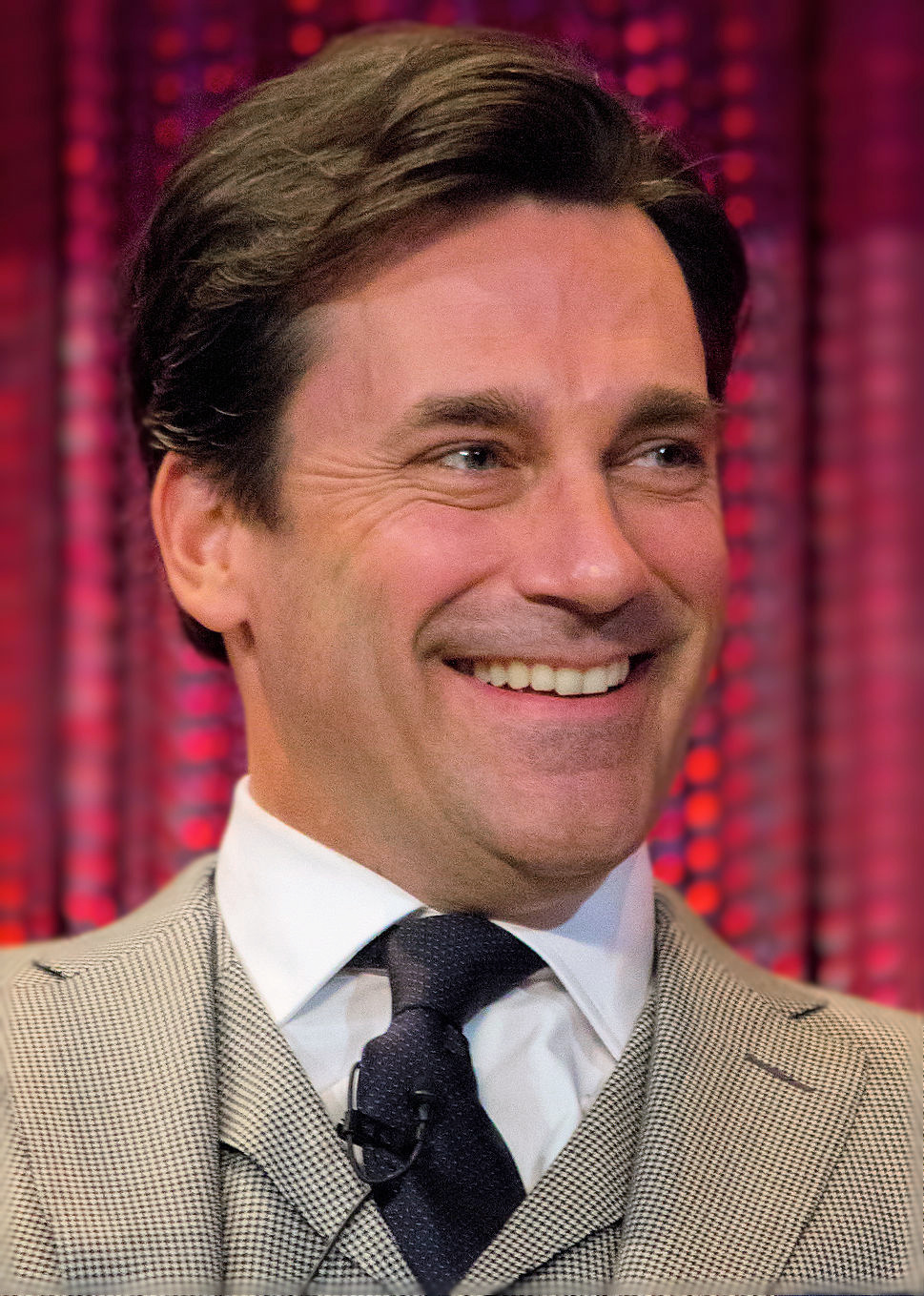
Hamm received two Golden Globe Awards and a Primetime Emmy Award for his performance.

Hamm's portrayal of Don Draper received acclaim from critics and audiences alike. Draper has been cited as one of the greatest and most iconic TV characters of all time.

Dan Fienberg of HitFix wrote "Hamm's performance as Don Draper is the decade's definitive star turn, a breakout on par with what George Clooney did on ER for a brief period of the '90s. All Jon Hamm had to do was convince producers that there was value in Jon Hamm and he's done that in spades. If Matthew Weiner has occasionally pushed up against the limits of Hamm's range, it's only because Draper has been written as such a tortured and frequently unravelling character. To my mind, every time you think you've seen Hamm hit a wall, you get an episode like 'The Hobo Code' or 'For Those Who Think Young' or 'Meditations in an Emergency' or, especially, this past season's 'The Gypsy and the Hobo.'" Bee Wilson of The Guardian praised Hamm's performance writing that "The Eames chairs and hour-glass dresses are a visual treat, but it's really all about Jon Hamm's performance as a man sickened by his womanising and in thrall to his own pretty lies".

In 2009, Ask Men named the fictional Don Draper the most influential man in the world, ahead of real-life figures. Additionally, Comcast listed him among TV's Most Intriguing Characters.

In 2010, Entertainment Weekly included Draper on its list of The 100 Greatest Characters of the Last 20 Years, and in 2015, they named Draper one of the 25 Best TV Characters of the Past 25 Years.

Hamm received eight nominations for the Primetime Emmy Award for Outstanding Lead Actor in a Drama Series for every season that Mad Men was eligible. Hamm failed to win seven times, losing out four times to Bryan Cranston for his portrayal of Walter White in Breaking Bad. Many critics felt that Matthew Weiner unnecessarily split up the final season of Mad Men over two parts and two years so Hamm would have an opportunity for the Emmy, since Breaking Bad had already ended its final season. Hamm indeed won his final nomination at the 67th Primetime Emmy Awards.

In addition to his Emmy, Hamm won the Golden Globe Award for Best Actor - Television Series Drama twice, in 2008 and 2016. He is tied with Ed Asner, John Forsythe, Hugh Laurie and Telly Savalas for most wins in the category. He also won the TCA Award for Individual Achievement in Drama twice, in 2011 and 2015; won the Critics' Choice Television Award for Best Actor in a Drama Series in 2011; and received six nominations for the Screen Actors Guild Award for Outstanding Performance by a Male Actor in a Drama Series.
