= Roger Sterling =

Fictional character from AMC TV series "Mad Men"

- Mad Men character
- John Slattery as Roger Sterling
- First appearance: "Smoke Gets in Your Eyes" (1.01)
- Last appearance: "Person to Person" (7.14)
- Created by: Matthew Weiner
- Portrayed by: John Slattery

In-universe information
- Full name: Roger H. Sterling Jr.
- Occupation: Founding Partner of Sterling Cooper Draper Pryce
- Family: Roger Sterling Sr. (deceased father); Mimsie Sterling (deceased mother)
- Spouses: Mona Sterling (ex-wife); Jane Sterling (ex-wife); Marie Calvet (wife)
- Children: Margaret Hargrove (daughter; with Mona); Kevin Harris (son; with Joan); Megan Calvet (step-daughter; with Marie)
- Relatives: Brooks Hargrove (son-in-law); Ellory Hargrove (grandson); Jessica (maternal aunt)
- Nationality: American
- Romances: Ida Blankenship (deceased ex-lover); Annabelle Mathis (ex-lover); Joan Harris (ex-lover); Marie Calvet (lover, later wife)

Roger H. Sterling Jr. is a fictional character on the AMC television series Mad Men. He formerly worked for Sterling Cooper, an advertising agency his father co-founded in 1923, before he became a founding partner at the new firm of Sterling Cooper Draper Pryce in late 1963. Sterling was portrayed by John Slattery.

== Biography ==
Roger Sterling is a US Navy veteran of World War II, having served in the Pacific theater, including in the Battle of Okinawa.

The "Sterling" in the firm's name refers to Roger's father rather than Roger. His father was the senior partner in the firm, which is why his name appears before that of Bertram Cooper (Robert Morse). A picture in Cooper's office shows Roger as a child alongside Cooper as a young adult. In the same scene, Cooper refers to the picture and calls Roger "Peanut," indicating that Roger has known Cooper for most of his life. In Season 2, Bertram Cooper mentions that "the late Mrs. Cooper" introduced Roger to his wife, Mona (played by Slattery's real-life spouse, Talia Balsam), whom Roger is in the process of divorcing in favor of Don's former secretary, the 20-year-old Jane Siegel (Peyton List). Bertram Cooper's sister, Alice Cooper, babysat Sterling when he was a child.

Roger is a notorious womanizer and a heavy smoker and drinker (living like he was "on shore leave") until two heart attacks in the same year force him to slow down, at least for a while. He retains considerable affection from both Sterling Cooper employees (with whom he has far more contact than Bert Cooper) and his family. By 1962, Roger has returned to work and is seen to indulge in his old habits. Numerous episodes in the third season imply that he is genuinely happy with Jane: for example, he turns down an old flame trying to rekindle their relationship.

Mona later remarries, which angers Roger at his mother's memorial service when she brings her new husband to the event. Roger and Mona have a daughter, Margaret (Elizabeth Rice), who is spoiled and demanding. She marries a very suitable young man, Brooks Hargrove (Derek Ray), of the same class and social set into which she was raised. The wedding is inadvertently scheduled for November 23, 1963, the day after President John F. Kennedy is assassinated. Margaret then has a son, Ellery, and periodically sees her father to ask for money. However, as the 1960s wear on, Margaret "turns on, tunes in, and drops out".

She runs away from her family and moves to a communal farm in upstate New York, where she has a garden, lives in a ramshackle old barnhouse, and living a lifestyle punctuated by promiscuous sex with other members and substandard hygiene. She rejects Roger and Mona's efforts to take her back home, throwing back in Roger's face that he abandoned her, so now she in turn can abandon her son. Roger and Mona effectively disown Margaret, and help to raise their grandson, and are shown to be watching the Apollo Moon landing with him. In the series finale, Roger bluntly states that Margaret is "lost" and that she has been 100% cut out of his will.

The series periodically explores the romantic tension between Roger and his former mistress, Joan Holloway (Christina Hendricks). Their feelings for each other reach their peak after they are mugged at gunpoint one evening. Overcome with emotion and excitement, Roger and Joan have sex in a back alley, and this encounter leaves Joan pregnant. Though initially she and Roger acknowledge that they can't have the child and Joan goes to get an abortion, by the season finale Joan has changed her mind and tells her husband, Greg (Samuel Page) about the pregnancy, but not that Roger was responsible.

Meanwhile, Roger and Jane's marriage is falling apart. They are constantly snapping at one another, and the only thing Roger ever says to her is how good she looks. After taking LSD with Jane, they both finally come to terms with the fact that their marriage is over. After his LSD trip, Roger starts to take his job and life more seriously. He also maintains amicable relationships with both of his ex-wives, especially with Mona, who helps him to build business relationships, even after their divorce.

After Greg and Joan split, Roger attempts to help financially support his and Joan's son, Kevin, but Joan, fearful of the stigma Kevin would suffer, if it were to come out that he was the product of an illicit affair, refuses. However, she soon invites Roger over for Thanksgiving, allowing him to spend time with Kevin and be a part of his life. At the close of the series, Roger again requests that Joan allow him to divide his estate between his grandson Ellery and his son Kevin, to make sure that he is taken care of after Roger's death.

When Don causes a mortifying error to the firm by drunkenly admitting his true past during a pitch to Hershey's chocolate employees, Roger agrees with Joan, Bert, and Jim that Don should take a long leave of absence to figure some things out for himself. After which, the partners agree, they will determine Don's fate with the firm, including the possibility of his termination. Roger, however, secretly makes deals to keep Don, arguably out of remorse for similar behavior that cost the firm an account with Honda, in his case launching into an anti-Japanese tirade.

When Don marries his secretary Megan Calvet (Jessica Paré), Roger meets her mother Marie (Julia Ormond), and the two have a brief but intense affair. When Marie returns late in Season 7 to help Megan move out of the Draper apartment, she calls Roger for help on settling the bill with the movers. At Marie's urging the two resume their relationship. They marry shortly thereafter and are last seen together in a café in Paris at the end of the series.

== Reception ==
Slattery received four consecutive Primetime Emmy Award nominations and two Critics' Choice Television Awards nominations for his performance. He has also won the Screen Actors Guild Award for Outstanding Performance by an Ensemble in a Drama Series twice along with the cast of Mad Men.
