= Kelly & Cal =

Kelly and Cal
- Theatrical poster
- Directed by: Jen McGowan
- Written by: Amy Lowe Starbin
- Produced by: Adi Ezroni; Mandy Tagger-Brockey
- Starring: Juliette Lewis; Jonny Weston; Josh Hopkins; Cybill Shepherd
- Cinematography: Philip Lott
- Edited by: David Hopper
- Music by: Toby Chu
- Production companies: Spring Pictures; Mountaintop Productions; Mad Dog Pictures
- Distributed by: IFC Films
- Release date: March 7, 2014
- Running time: 104 minutes
- Country: United States
- Language: English

Kelly and Cal is a 2014 American comedy-drama film directed by Jen McGowan, written by Amy Lowe Starbin, and starring Juliette Lewis, Jonny Weston, and Cybill Shepherd. Its plot follows an ex-punk rocker-turned-suburban housewife who becomes friends with a troubled 17-year-old boy.

== Cast ==
- Juliette Lewis as Kelly
- Jonny Weston as Cal
- Josh Hopkins as Josh
- Cybill Shepherd as Bev
- Lucy Owen as Julie
- Ken Marks as Bill
- Margaret Colin as Janice

== Critical response ==
On the review aggregator website Rotten Tomatoes, 71% of 35 critics' reviews are positive, with an average rating of 6.1/10. The website's consensus reads: "Kelly & Cal is a compellingly offbeat treat for fans of character-driven drama -- and a showcase for Juliette Lewis' formidable gifts." Metacritic, which uses a weighted average, assigned the film a score of 64 out of 100, based on 15 critics, indicating "generally favorable" reviews.

Rodrigo Perez of IndieWire wrote that "while Kelly & Cal flirts with interesting concepts under a superficial dynamic you haven’t seen paired before, ultimately its narrative is both familiar and predictable."
