= Dirty Country =

- Directed by: Joe Pickett; Nick Prueher
- Produced by: Todd Hansen; William Kruse; Stu Pollard; Dan Satorius
- Starring: Larry Pierce; Doug Clark and the Hot Nuts; Blowfly; John Valby
- Cinematography: Joe Pickett; Nick Prueher
- Edited by: Matt Ehling, ETS Pictures
- Music by: Craig Soderberg; Larry Pierce
- Release date: March 14, 2007 (South by Southwest Film Festival)
- Running time: 71 minutes
- Country: United States
- Language: English

Dirty Country is a 2007 documentary film that tells the real-life story of Larry Pierce, a small-town factory worker and family man who happens to be the raunchiest country music singer in America. Since 1993, Larry has quietly released over a dozen dirty country albums at truck stops across the country. Without the time or money to pursue a "legitimate" career in country music, Larry is content to lead an ordinary life and moonlight as a dirty country singer. But when he is forced into early retirement at his factory job of 30 years, Larry faces an uncertain future. Until an unexpected turn of events thrusts his songs out of obscurity and into the spotlight.

== Plot ==
Dirty Country introduces an ordinary man with an extraordinary gift for dirty music. The film also profiles several living legends of the raunchy music business, including piano virtuoso Dr. Dirty, rap pioneer Blowfly, and the original party band, Doug Clark's Hot Nuts. With commentary from authors, experts and social critics, the film poses the question: "Is America a nation of prudes or are we living in a dirty country?" Dirty Country is a peek into the underground phenomenon of raunchy songs, the people who write them, and the fans who have made dirty music such an enduring American tradition.

== Release ==
This is the feature directorial debut for Joe Pickett and Nick Prueher, whose credits include The Onion and the Late Show with David Letterman. They are also the founders and hosts of the Found Footage Festival, a national touring comedy show that has brought them to the Just For Laughs Festival in Montreal, The HBO Comedy Festival at Caesars Palace in Las Vegas, and hundreds of sold-out venues across the U.S., Canada, and Europe. Pickett and Prueher's short films, including Gas 'N Fuel and Saving Human Lives, have been featured on the Independent Film Channel and at film festivals across the country.

Dirty Country premiered at the South by Southwest Film Festival on March 14, 2007, where it won the 24 Beats Per Second Audience Award. It is currently touring on the film festival circuit.

Larry Pierce has been championed by Howard Stern on his Sirius radio show. His songs could not be played on his previous radio show due to their content.
