= Bees Make Honey =

Bees Make Honey may refer to:

- Bees Make Honey (band), British band
- Bees Make Honey (film), 2017 British film
