= Stu Pollard =

American film producer

- Born: Stuart B. Pollard; January 26, 1967 (age 59); Louisville, Kentucky, U.S.
- Education: Georgetown University, BSBA 1989; USC School of Cinematic Arts, MFA 1994
- Occupations: Producer, director, writer
- Years active: 1999–present
- Website: Lunacy Productions

Stu Pollard (born January 26, 1967) is an American film producer, writer and director. His credits include Nice Guys Sleep Alone and Keep Your Distance, as well as the 2019 survival thriller Rust Creek.

== Early life and education ==
Pollard was born in Louisville, Kentucky and attended Kentucky Country Day School. He graduated from Georgetown University in 1989, then spent three years working for New York's McCann-Erickson before moving to Los Angeles to earn his MFA from the USC School of Cinematic Arts.

== Career ==
After graduating from the University of Southern California, Pollard created Lunacy Unlimited, a production company that created a number of award-winning commercials and documentaries before eventually shifting its focus to features.

Pollard made his feature film debut in 1999, producing, writing and directing Nice Guys Sleep Alone, starring Sean O'Bryan and Vanessa Marcil. A romantic comedy about the dating scene in Louisville, the independent production was broadcast in over a dozen countries and carried on cable television's HBO. The film became the first Netflix exclusive, garnering press coverage from USA Today, Time, and Variety.

In 2005, Pollard delivered his second feature film. He produced, wrote, and directed Keep Your Distance, starring Gil Bellows and Jennifer Westfeldt. The thriller depicts a seemingly perfect marriage, which slowly dissolves at the foot of betrayal.

Pollard received a number of producing credits for independent films from 2006 through 2015, including Ira & Abby and Bass Ackwards. In 2015, Pollard founded his production company Lunacy Productions in order to break free of the "one at a time" model of independent filmmaking and have multiple projects in development at a time. Lunacy has offices in Louisville, Kentucky, and Los Angeles, California, and focuses on supporting emerging filmmakers while also working on new materials with established talent.

With Lunacy Productions, Pollard produced the critically acclaimed survival thriller Rust Creek, which won the Best Thriller Feature Award at the San Diego International Film Festival. On November 30, 2020, Rust Creek had its Netflix debut. The film spent more than a week on Netflix's top ten movies list. His latest release is the romantic comedy Plus One, starring Jack Quaid and Maya Erskine.

Pollard is also an adjunct professor at the USC School of Cinematic Arts and teaches at Film Independent. He is a member of both the PGA and DGA.

== Filmography ==
Year	Film	Director	Producer	Writer	Notes
1999	Nice Guys Sleep Alone	Yes	Yes	Yes	Directorial debut
2005	Keep Your Distance	Yes	Yes	Yes	Breckenridge Festival of Film Best Feature
2006	Ira and Abby	No	Yes	No	
2007	Dirty Country	No	Yes	No	
2009	True Adolescents	No	Yes	No	
2010	Bass Ackwards	No	Yes	No	
2012	Pilgrim Song	No	Yes	No	
2013	Forty Years From Yesterday	No	Yes	No	
2016	Split	No	Yes	No	
2017	And Then I Go	No	Yes	No	New Hampshire Film Festival Best Feature
2017	The Outdoorsman	No	Yes	No	
2018	7 Splinters in Time	No	Yes	No	
2018	This Is Home: A Refugee Story	No	Yes	No	Sundance Film Festival Audience Award
2019	Rust Creek	No	Yes	Story	San Diego International Film Festival Best Thriller Feature
2019	Plus One	No	Yes	No	Tribeca Film Festival Audience Award Narrative
