= Dipo Ola =

British actor (born 1994)

- Education: Oxford School of Drama
- Occupation: Actor
- Years active: 2020–present
- Television: Ludwig

Dipo Ola is a British television actor, born in Ibadan, Nigeria in September 1994. His television credits include We Hunt Together (2020–2022) and Ludwig (2024–present).

== Career ==
Raised in Britain from childhood, Ola graduated from the Oxford School of Drama in 2018. He made his television debut in Channel 4 drama series Baghdad Central. He went on to appear in the BBC anthology comedy series Inside No. 9.

In 2020, Ola appeared in British crime drama series We Hunt Together portraying Baba alongside Hermione Corfield and Babou Ceesay. The following year, he could be seen in the second series of political thriller COBRA, and HBO true-crime drama Landscapers as solicitor Douglas alongside Olivia Colman and David Thewlis.

In January 2024, it was announced that Ola had been cast as police detective DI Russell Carter for BBC One comedy crime series Ludwig, alongside David Mitchell and Anna Maxwell Martin. Ola continued for the second series, broadcast in 2026, in which the backstory of his character, now a DCI, was explored.

== Partial filmography ==
Year	Title	Role	Notes
2020	Baghdad Central	Kellerman	3 episodes
2020	Inside No. 9	Calvin	1 episode
2020-2022	We Hunt Together	Baba	10 episodes
2021	COBRA	Mark	2 episodes
2021	Landscapers	Douglas	4 episodes
2024	McDonald & Dodds	Cal	1 episode
2024-2026	Ludwig	Russell Carter	Lead cast
