= Ekaterina Baker =

Russian-born Canadian actress (born 1988 or 1989)

Ekaterina Baker (born 1988 or 1989) is a Russian-born Canadian actress.

== Personal life ==
She is married to Rodney Baker, the former president and CEO of the Great Canadian Gaming Corporation. They reside in Vancouver.

In January 2021, she and her husband allegedly chartered a private plane to Beaver Creek, Yukon, where they allegedly posed as workers from a local motel in order to take advantage of a COVID vaccine clinic intended for area residents.

== Filmography ==
=== As actress ===
Year	Title	Role	Notes
2020	Oksana and Viktor	Oksana	Short film
2020	The Comeback Trail	Sister Mary Masha	
2020	Fatman	Helga	
2020	Chick Fight	Veronica	
2021	Asking for It	Natalya	
2021	Lansky	Masha	
2021	Neptune Frost	Global News Anchor Emilia	
2021	The Protégé	Technician Lotta	
2021	The Card Counter	Sara	
2023	Jamojaya	Actor	
2023	Parachute	Danielle	
2023	The Tutor	Teddi	
2023	Cold Copy	Alix	
2024	The Clean Up Crew	Meagan	
2024	Silver Star	Alice	

=== As executive producer ===
- Chick Fight (2020)
- 12 Mighty Orphans (2021)
- Asking for It (2021)
- Neptune Frost (2021)
- The Protégé (2021)
- Big Gold Brick (2022)
