= Anatole Taubman =

Swiss-British actor

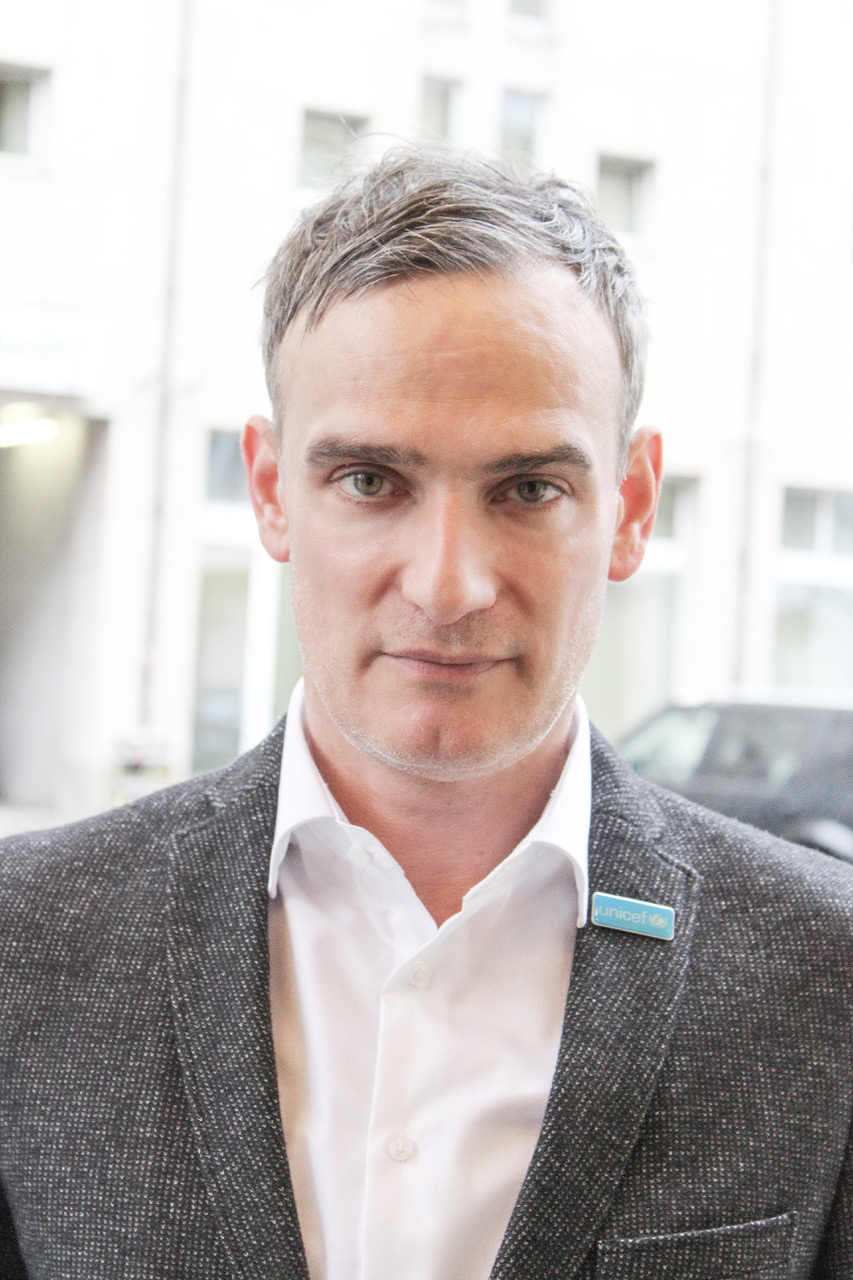
- Anatole Taubman in 2019
- Born: 23 December 1970 (age 55); Zürich, Switzerland
- Occupation: Actor
- Years active: 1998–present

Anatole Taubman (born 23 December 1970) is a Swiss-British actor. He is best known for his performance as Elvis in Quantum of Solace and as Bernd Doppler in Dark. He has appeared in more than ninety films since 1998 and has played major roles in several films including The Circle.

== Selected filmography ==
Year	Title	Role	Notes
2001	Band of Brothers	Concentration camp prisoner	
2004	Foyle’s War	Raimund Weiser	
2006	Fay Grim	Jallal	
2007	Marmorera	Simon Cavegn	
2008	Quantum of Solace	Elvis	
2009	Coco Chanel & Igor Stravinsky	Boy Capel	
2009	Pope Joan	Anastasius Bibliothecarius	
2011	Resistance	Sebald	
2011	Largo Winch II	Beaumont	
2013	Lost Place	Falk Geisinger	
2013	Frau Ella	Rudolph	
2014	The Circle	Felix	
2014	Northmen: A Viking Saga	Bovarr	
2014	Therapy for a Vampire	Ignaz	
2015	Versailles	Montcourt	TV series, 10 episodes
2017	Bees Make Honey	Mr. Werner	
2017	Bye Bye Germany	Fränkel	
2018	The Apparition	Anton Meyer	
2019	Brecht	Ernst Josef Aufricht	
2024	Heavier Trip	Fisto	
2026	111 Echoes from Halifax		
