= Jonny Weston =

American actor (born 1988)

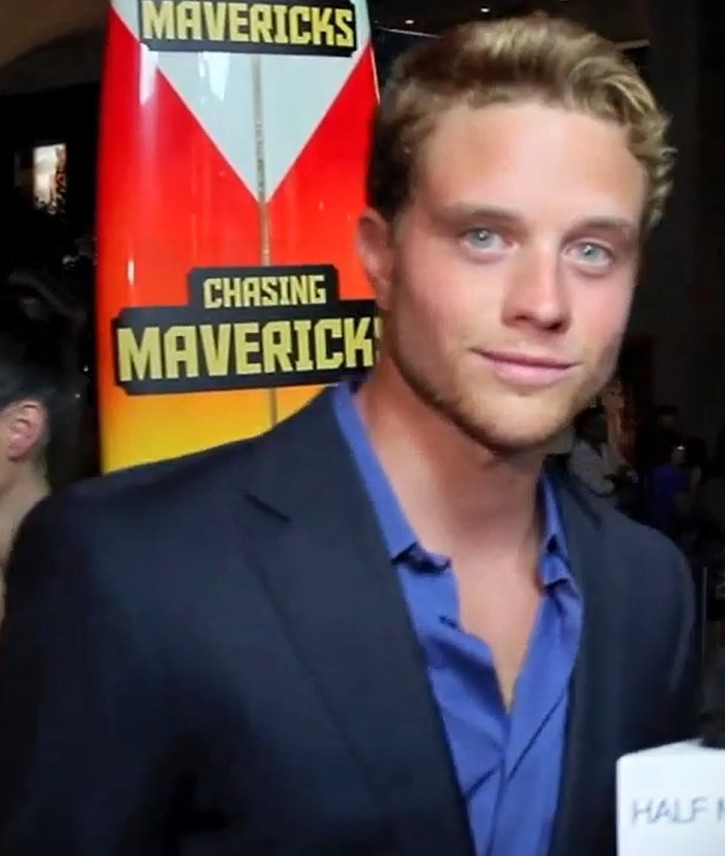
- Weston at a Chasing Mavericks showing in 2012
- Born: June 16, 1988 (age 37); Charleston, South Carolina, U.S.
- Occupation: Actor
- Years active: 2011–present

Jonny Weston (born June 16, 1988) is an American actor. He starred as real-life surfer Jay Moriarity in the 2012 film Chasing Mavericks and as brainy high school student David Raskin in the 2015 time-travel adventure Project Almanac. He has also appeared in Sugar, John Dies at the End, About Cherry, Caroline and Jackie, and Kelly & Cal.

== Early life ==
Weston was born in Charleston, South Carolina. His mother is an educational therapist and his father runs a Christian radio station.

== Filmography ==
Film
Year	Title	Role	Notes
2011	Someday This Pain Will Be Useful to You	Thom	
2012	John Dies at the End	Justin White	
2012	About Cherry	Bobby	
2012	Caroline and Jackie	Jack	
2012	Under the Bed	Neal Hausman	
2012	Chasing Mavericks	Jay Moriarity	
2013	Sugar	B-Wild	
2014	Kelly & Cal	Cal	
2014	Taken 3	Jimmy	
2015	Project Almanac	David Raskin	
2015	The Divergent Series: Insurgent	Edgar	
2015	We Are Your Friends	Dustin Mason	
2016	The Divergent Series: Allegiant	Edgar	
2017	Beyond Skyline	Trent Corley	
2018	Benjamin	Tom	
2023	The Tutor	Gavin	

Television
Year	Title	Role	Notes
2011	Pocket Dial	Andrew	Episode: "Intercom"
2011	Supah Ninjas	James / Spyder	Episode: "Subsiders"
2011	ASS Apartment Sketch Show	Philip	Episode: "Smurf"
2018	Medal of Honor	Ty M. Carter	Episode: "Ty M. Carter"
