= Betsy Rue =

American actress

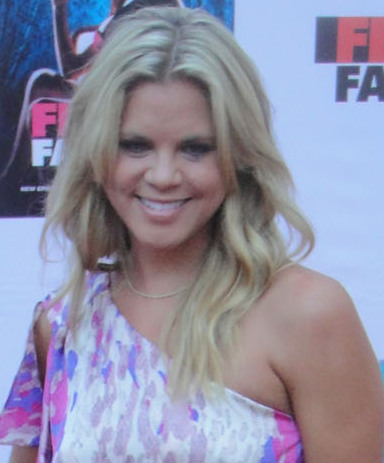
- Rue in 2012
- Born: Elizabeth Anne Rue; May 7, 1979 (age 47); Roseville, Minnesota, U.S.
- Other name: Elizabeth Reynolds
- Occupations: Actress; model
- Years active: 2006–2016
- Spouse: Aron Reynolds (m. 2012)
- Children: 2

Betsy Rue (born May 7, 1979) is an American retired actress and former model.

== Early life ==
Rue was born Elizabeth Anne Rue on May 7, 1979, in Roseville, Minnesota, to Curt and Cheryl Rue. She has one sister and one brother.

== Career ==
Rue is best known for her work in feature films and television. She portrayed Irene in My Bloody Valentine 3D (2009), Strawberrius in Miss March (2009), Jazlean Benny in Halloween II (2009), and Ashley Saint in Lucky Bastard (2013). Her work in television includes appearances on the shows Unfabulous, How I Met Your Mother, According to Jim, True Blood, Femme Fatales, Eastwick and iCarly.

== Personal life ==
In May 2012, she married her husband Aron Reynolds. Together, they have twin daughters who were born in September 2015.

== Filmography ==
=== Film ===
Year	Film	Role	Notes	Ref.
2007	The Heartbreak Kid	Mimi	Uncredited	
2009	My Bloody Valentine 3D	Irene	Supporting	
2009	Miss March	Strawberrius	Supporting	
2009	Deep in the Valley	Candystripper	Cameo	
2009	Halloween II	Jazlean Benny	Supporting	
2010	Sebastian	Carly Roebuck	Lead	
2010	Groupie	Nikki	Lead	
2010	Hallow Pointe	Tracy	Lead	
2010	Cowboys from Hell 3D	Katie	Lead	
2013	Lucky Bastard	Ashley Saint	Lead	
2015	The Hospital 2	Skye		
2015	Book of Fire	Adriana		

=== Television ===
Year	Title	Role	Notes	Ref.
2006	Still Standing	Brandy	1 episode	
2006	Las Vegas	Ass Grabbin' Girl	1 episode	
2007	CSI: Crime Scene Investigation	Libby Cooperson	1 episode	
2007	Unfabulous	Summer	1 episode	
2007	Journeyman	Stewardess	1 episode	
2007	How I Met Your Mother	Audrey	1 episode	
2007	'Til Death	Hot Girl on Treadmill	1 episode	
2008	According To Jim	Gloria	1 episode	
2008	NCIS	Sasha Gordon	1 episode	
2009	Bones	Shiny Kopinsky	1 episode	
2009	True Blood	Shawnelle	1 episode	
2009	Eastwick	Melody	1 episode	
2009	Woke Up Dead	Deb	1 episode	
2010	iCarly	Ginger Fox	1 episode	
2010	90210	Holly Woodlove	1 episode	
2010	Fake It Til You Make It	Kathy Buttram	8 episodes	
2010	The Mentalist	Misty Dawn	1 episode	
2012	Femme Fatales	Libra	2 episodes	

== Discography ==
=== Singles ===
Year	Title	Album	Details
2010	"Hate Me, Love Me"	—N/a	Released as part of an iCarly episode
2010	"My World"	—N/a	Released as part of an iCarly episode
