= Lucky Bastard (2013 film) =

- Theatrical release poster
- Directed by: Robert Nathan
- Written by: Lukas Kendall; Robert Nathan
- Starring: Don McManus; Jay Paulson; Betsy Rue
- Cinematography: Clay Westervelt
- Edited by: Tony Randel
- Production company: Vineyard Haven
- Distributed by: Cavu Pictures; Revolver Entertainment
- Release dates: May 2013 (Monaco Film Festival); February 14, 2014 (United States)
- Running time: 94 minutes
- Country: United States
- Language: English

Lucky Bastard is a 2013 found footage horror film and the directorial debut of American producer Robert Nathan. The film had its world premiere in May 2013 at the Monaco Film Festival and was given a limited theatrical release on February 14, 2014, in the United States. It stars Don McManus as a porn site owner that finds more than he anticipated when he hires a seemingly docile young man (Jay Paulson) to have sex on camera.

The film's sexual content resulted in the movie gaining a NC-17 rating. The film staff was given recommendations on how to change this to an R rating, but they declined because "if we recut it there won’t be any movie left".

== Plot ==
The film opens with police investigating a crime scene littered with bodies. It then cuts to a week prior, where Casey (Catherine Annette) is being interviewed for a potential porn shoot with Devin (Clint Brink) and Josh (Lee Kholafai). She's assaulted and despite the attempts of fellow porn star Ashley Saint (Betsy Rue), the two women are overpowered. The men seem intent on raping both women, but a minor accident causes the actors to fall out of character and reveal that the entire scene is a setup. Ashley is later approached by Mike (Don McManus), who requests that she make a segment for the website "Lucky Bastard", which will show random men getting the chance to have sex with a porn star. Although initially against the idea, Ashley is reluctantly persuaded after she is shown a video of a shy and unassuming man named Dave (Jay Paulson).

Despite Mike's initial reassurances, the shoot is off to a disastrous start as Mike scolds Dave for wearing the wrong clothing and Dave himself is reluctant to participate in filming that doesn't include sex. The crew eventually does skip to the sexual content, only to be thrown out of a restaurant. While Mike is off trying to settle things with the restaurant, Dave approaches Ashley for a date outside of the shoot, also revealing that he knows a lot of personal information about her. This unsettles Ashley, who grows worried that Dave might be a stalker. Dave apologizes and the shoot continues to progress.

As they cannot film at the restaurant, the crew goes to a house previously used for a reality show and as such, has cameras in every room. However things go awry again when Dave prematurely ejaculates before the scene can be filmed and ends up accidentally assaulting Ashley, who storms off. Mike follows Ashley and apologizes, saying that he will send Dave home. The dismissal does not sit well with Dave, who demands that he be given the footage. Mike refuses and taunts him that it will be put on the "Lucky Bastard" website. Dave leaves and Mike recruits a more reliable porn actor to take his place. All of this causes Dave to snap, and he infiltrates the house kills each crew member until only he and Ashley remain. She manages to persuade him into sparing her by offering to have sex with him, but she then overpowers him, grabs his gun and shoots Dave in the head. The viewer is left to wonder whether the events of the movie truly transpired, or if it was all an act for the cameras.

== Cast ==
- Don McManus as Mike
- Jay Paulson as Dave G.
- Betsy Rue as Ashley Saint
- Chris Wylde as Kris
- Catherine Annette as Casey
- Lee Kholafai as Josh
- Lanny Joon as Nico
- Clint Brink as Devin
- Deborah Zoe as Suzanne
- Angela Shin as Maitre D'

== Production ==
Of the film, Nathan stated that he was inspired to create the movie after his writing and producing partner showed him a porn website that would invite its members to have sex on camera. Nathan found it difficult to believe that the participants, who were portrayed as ordinary, were as normal as they appeared and wondered what it would be like if the "wrong guy" was hired.

In keeping with the "found footage" concept of the film, the closing credits list the fictional character Ashley Saint as one of the producers.

== Reception ==
Critical reception for Lucky Bastard was mixed. On the review aggregator website Rotten Tomatoes, 52% of 25 critics' reviews are positive. The website's consensus reads: "Lucky Bastard takes its lurid premise in some interesting directions -- albeit perhaps not quite as interesting as the story seems to think." On Metacritic it has a score of 36% based on 9 reviews.

Common elements of praise centered around the film's actors and Fangoria stated that the performances by Rue and Paulson "are a large part of what makes the main section of Lucky Bastard work". Criticism for the film stemmed from what reviewers saw as a lack of tension, and JoBlo.com noted that the film was largely watchable but that much of it was due to the movie's acting. Variety panned the film, praising its technical aspects while writing that the movie was overall tedious.

Gary Goldstein of the Los Angeles Times gave a favorable review for Lucky Bastard and called it a "clever thriller", praising the movie's script and stating that "Although sexual activity and nudity are abundant, they rarely feel gratuitous."

== Awards ==
- Special Jury Prize at the Monaco Film Festival (2013)
- Best Screenplay Award at the Monaco Film Festival (2013)
