= Rumi Sutton =

English actress

- Education: Royal Central School of Speech and Drama
- Occupation: Actress
- Years active: 2022–present
- Television: Ludwig

Rumi Sutton is a British actress. Her television credits include Ludwig. For her work on stage she was nominated at the Ian Charleson Awards for her role as Cecily in The Importance of Being Earnest at Manchester's Royal Exchange Theatre in 2024.

== Early life ==
From Colne, Lancashire, Sutton attended Laneshawbridge Primary School and Westholme School in Blackburn.

== Career ==
Sutton trained at the Royal Central School of Speech and Drama and had early stage roles in Miss Saigon at the Crucible Theatre in Sheffield, Hex at the Royal National Theatre and Heathers at Theatre Royal Haymarket and on a UK tour. She was nominated at the Ian Charleson Awards in 2024 for her role as Cecily in The Importance of Being Earnest at the Royal Exchange Theatre, with her performance described as "joyously confident" by The Times.

In 2025, Sutton appeared in the short film A Memory Owed, written and directed by Martin Hemingway-Moseley and co-starring James Bolam as an RAF veteran. The film was an online hit, and was called "impressive and moving" by Stephen Fry.

Sutton's television credits include British series Daddy Issues and After the Flood. In 2026, she joined the cast of BBC One's detective dramedy series Ludwig in a series regular role as DC Caitlin Sullivan.

== Partial filmography ==
Year	Title	Role	Notes
2025	A Memory Owed	Abby	Short film
2025	Daddy Issues	Becky	1 episode
2026	After the Flood	Saskia	1 episode
2026	Mutiny	Seng	
2026	Ludwig	DC Caitlin Sullivan	6 episodes
