= Chasing Mavericks =

2012 film by Curtis Hanson and Michael Apted

- Theatrical release poster
- Directed by: Curtis Hanson; Michael Apted
- Screenplay by: Kario Salem
- Story by: Jim Meenaghan; Brandon Hooper
- Produced by: Curtis Hanson; Mark Johnson; Brandon Hooper; Jim Meenaghan
- Starring: Gerard Butler; Jonny Weston; Elisabeth Shue; Abigail Spencer
- Cinematography: Bill Pope
- Edited by: John Gilbert
- Music by: Chad Fischer
- Production companies: Fox 2000 Pictures; Walden Media; Deuce Three Productions
- Distributed by: 20th Century Fox (North America, France and Spain); Lakeshore Entertainment (International)
- Release date: October 26, 2012
- Running time: 116 minutes
- Country: United States
- Language: English
- Budget: $20 million
- Box office: $7.9 million

Chasing Mavericks is a 2012 American biographical drama film about the life of American surfer Jay Moriarity (portrayed by Jonny Weston). It was directed by Curtis Hanson and Michael Apted, and stars Gerard Butler, Elisabeth Shue, Abigail Spencer, and Leven Rambin.

Filming took place in October 2011. While Hanson began production, Apted was brought in to finish the final 15 days of shooting and post due to Hanson's failing health. It was the final film directed by Hanson before his death in 2016, and the second-to-last film directed by Apted before his death in 2021.

Chasing Mavericks was released in the United States on October 26, 2012, received mixed reviews from critics, and grossed $7 million against its $20 million budget.

== Plot ==
In 1987, an 8-year-old boy in Santa Cruz, California, named Jay Moriarity is saved from drowning by his next door neighbor, surfer Frosty Hesson (Gerard Butler). This ignites his passion for the sport.

One morning, Jay (Jonny Weston), now 15, sees Frosty leaving early and hitches a ride on his van. He sees Frosty and three of his friends riding a gigantic swell known as Mavericks which, with El Niño coming in, will be at its height in three months' time.

Reluctantly, Frosty agrees to teach Jay how to surf Mavericks, but insists that he learn about the "foundation pillars of surfing". This involves learning to paddle board 36 miles across Monterey Bay (from Santa Cruz to Monterey), treading water for 40 minutes and being able to hold his breath for four minutes.

While training, Frosty encourages Jay to write essays to focus on the task. His first essay is about Kim (Leven Rambin), his crush, whose dog he saved when he was 8, which caused him to nearly drown. Jay gets closer to Kim as he trains, partially encouraged by Frosty's wife, Brenda (Abigail Spencer). A few weeks before the biggest swell of the season hits Mavericks, Brenda has a stroke and dies.

A few days later, distraught from Brenda's death, Frosty paddles out into the bay. Jay follows him, and using the knowledge from his training, he gets Frosty back to shore. Frosty realizes that Jay is ready to ride Mavericks. Frosty takes Jay to Mavericks at Half Moon Bay and watches with his three friends as Jay treads water against the tide. The group agrees that Jay is ready to ride with them.

On Jay's 16th birthday on June 15, 1994, his mother (Elisabeth Shue) gives him a radio to listen to weather broadcasts and track the swell. Frosty gives him a custom-made "big wave gun" (a long surfboard especially designed for riding big waves). Kim reveals her feelings and they share a kiss.

Frosty had wanted to keep Mavericks a secret, but Jay's notebook that he had been using for preparation ends up in the hands of his rival Sonny (Taylor Handley). When Jay and Frosty go to Half Moon Bay, there is a large crowd and boats taking surfers out.

Many of the newcomers wipe out before getting to surf Mavericks. Jay wipes out at first, but then retrieves his board and successfully rides Mavericks. A title card reveals that he married Kim and died at age 22 while free-diving in the Maldives. The film ends with Frosty, Kim, and an assemblage of others holding a surfers' memorial service for Jay.

== Cast ==
- Gerard Butler as Richard "Frosty" Hesson
- Jonny Weston as Jay Moriarity
  - Cooper Timberline as Young Jay Moriarty
- Elisabeth Shue as Kristy Moriarity
- Abigail Spencer as Brenda Hesson
- Leven Rambin as Kim
  - Harley Graham as Young Kim
- Greg Long as Magnificent 1
- Peter Mel as Magnificent 2
- Zach Wormhoudt as Magnificent 3
- Devin Crittenden as Blond
  - Gary Griffis as Young Blond
- Taylor Handley as Sonny
  - Keegan Boos as Young Sonny
- Scott Eastwood as Gordy (uncredited)
- Colter Sanders as Alexander (uncredited)
- Patrick and Asher Tesler as Infant Lake Hesson (uncredited)

== Production ==
The film went into production in October 2011 around Half Moon Bay and Santa Cruz, California. On December 19, Gerard Butler was hospitalized briefly after being injured during a surfing stunt. Gerard Butler was mentored by big-wave surfer Grant Washburn. Michael Apted received director credit alongside Curtis Hanson after he took over as director during the last 15 days of principal photography, while Hanson recovered from complications arising from recent heart surgery.

== Soundtrack ==
Chasing Mavericks (Original Motion Picture Soundtrack)

Compilation album by Various
- Released: October 22, 2012
- Genre: Alternative rock
- Label: Relativity Music Group

CD
No.	Title	Artist	Length
1.	"Plowed"	Sponge	3:17
2.	"Brimful of Asha"	Cornershop	5:17
3.	"Blue Light"	Mazzy Star	5:08
4.	"Girlfriend"	Matthew Sweet	3:40
5.	"Pepper"	Butthole Surfers	4:56
6.	"Start Choppin"	Dinosaur Jr.	5:37
7.	"Fade into You"	Mazzy Star	4:54
8.	"Into Your Arms"	The Lemonheads	3:54
9.	"I Need an Energy"	Greg Holden	4:35
10.	"Chasing Mavericks Score Suite"	Chad Fischer	5:57

Other songs used in the film

- The Offspring – "Come Out and Play"
- Jules Larson – "Honey Baby"

== Reception ==
=== Box office ===
Chasing Mavericks grossed $6 million in the United States, and $1.9 million in other territories, for a worldwide total of $7.9 million.

The film was released on October 26, 2012, in 2,002 theaters, grossing $2.3 million in its opening weekend and finishing 13th at the box office; Box Office Mojo called the figure "dreadful." It was the 11th-worst debut for a film playing in over 2,000 theaters. It made $1.2 million in its second weekend then lost 1,571 theaters and grossed $448,648 in its third.

=== Critical response ===
On Rotten Tomatoes it has an approval rating of 32% based on 81 reviews, with an average rating of 4.90/10. The site's consensus states: "It's sweet, gentle, and affably modest, but Chasing Mavericks is ultimately pulled under by an unconvincing script and a puzzling lack of energy." On Metacritic it has a score of 45 out 100 based on reviews from 27 critics, indicating "mixed or average" reviews. Audiences polled by CinemaScore gave the film a grade "B+" on scale of A to F.

Roger Ebert praised the film, saying that "Chasing Mavericks is made with more care and intelligence than many another film starting with its template might have been. It's better than most movies targeted at teens. And the cinematography of the big Mavericks scene by Oliver Euclid and Bill Pope is so frightening that you sort of understand why Frosty stays on the shore, watching Jay with binoculars."

== Home media ==
Chasing Mavericks was released on DVD and Blu-ray Disc on February 26, 2013.

== Book ==
In October 2012, Frosty Hesson published Making Mavericks with Zola Books. The book is a memoir filled with Hesson's life-affirming lessons and described his experience mentoring Jay Moriarity.
