= Jen McGowan =

American filmmaker

Jen McGowan is an American filmmaker. At the 2014 South by Southwest Film Festival, McGowan won the Gamechanger Award for Kelly & Cal, her first feature film. McGowan is the creator of filmpowered.com, an international skill-sharing, networking, and job resource for professional women in film and television.

== Career ==
Jen McGowan began her career as a filmmaker when she received her BFA from NYU’s Tisch School of the Arts. There she studied film and trained as an actor at the Atlantic Theater Company with David Mamet, William H. Macy, and Sam Shepard. During this period, McGowan worked with New York companies such as RSA/Black Dog, A Band Apart, Killer Films, and Propaganda. She worked on independent feature films, including the Oscar-winning Boys Don't Cry.

McGowan received a grant from The Caucus Foundation for her thesis film, Confessions of a Late Bloomer, which began its festival run at the Tribeca Film Festival.

McGowan then directed the short film Touch, which won the Grand Jury Award for Best Narrative Short at the 2010 Florida Film Festival, qualifying that film for Oscar Nomination. McGowan began development on Kelly & Cal, her feature directorial debut, through the First Team project at USC, which fostered projects for their alumni.

Her second feature film, Rust Creek, was distributed by IFC Midnight. She has directed episodes of television for shows such as The Twilight Zone, Star Trek: Discovery and Titans.

She is an icon member of the Alliance of Women Directors, a member of the Los Angeles chapter of Film Fatales, a Film Independent Fellow, and a member of the Television Academy. McGowan is a Co-Chair of the DGA Women's Steering Committee Squad Program dedicated to supporting mid-career DGA Women Directors.

== Kelly & Cal ==
Kelly & Cal stars Juliette Lewis, Jonny Weston, Cybill Shepherd, Margaret Colin and Josh Hopkins, and premiered at the SXSW Film Festival in Austin, Texas, in March 2014. The film tells the story of a riot grrrl turned housewife (Lewis) who strikes up an unlikely friendship with her 17-year-old neighbor (Weston). The film opened at SXSW to positive reviews from Variety, The Wrap and other sites. It made best of the fest lists with Vogue and Variety. Senior writer Karen Valby at Entertainment Weekly compared Kelly & Cal to the work of filmmakers Nicole Holofcener and Alexander Payne.

== Rust Creek ==
Starring Hermione Corfield, stars as college student Sawyer who becomes lost while on a road trip and is hunted by criminals who believe her to be a witness to their crimes. As she's punished by the elements and fleeing her hunters, she is forced into an uneasy alliance with an enigmatic loner who has shadowy intentions. The film was given a date and date of release by IFC Midnight Films. Rust Creek spent more than a week on Netflix’s top ten movies list.

== Glass Elevator ==
Glass Elevator (as Film Powered) was founded by McGowan, who explained, "I wanted to get to know more women so I could hire more women."

In 2019, production studio Level Forward announced that it had acquired a 50% stake in the site, and at Sundance 2019, it was announced that FilmPowered was changing its name to Glass Elevator.

As of June 2019, Glass Elevator hosts a network of over 3,000 vetted women.

== Awards ==
- SXSW Gamechanger Award
- Boulder International Film Festival Best New Filmmaker Award
- The Caucus Foundation for Television Producers, Writers, and Directors Grant
- Alliance of Women Directors Breakout Star Award

== Filmography ==
Year	Film/TV show	Role	Notes
2019	The Purge	Director	episode #16: "Happy Holidays"
2019	Rust Creek	Director	
2014	Kelly & Cal	Director	SXSW Gamechanger Award
2010	Touch	Director/Producer/Adapted By	Florida Film Festival Grand Jury Award Best Short; San Diego Film Festival Best Short Film
2005	Confessions of a Late Bloomer	Director	Narrative Short
2001	She Never	Director/Writer	Narrative Short
