= Ludwig (2024 TV series) =

British 2024 television series

- Actors Anna Maxwell Martin and David Mitchell and the Ludwig signature that John uses as his nom-de-plume.
- Genre: Comedy drama; Detective; Mystery
- Created by: Mark Brotherhood
- Written by: Mark Brotherhood
- Directed by: Robert McKillop; Jill Robertson; George Kane; Stella Corradi
- Starring: David Mitchell; Anna Maxwell Martin; Dipo Ola; Izuka Hoyle; Gerran Howell; Dorothy Atkinson; Dylan Hughes; Sophie Willan; Ralph Ineson; Mark Bonnar; Sian Clifford; Rumi Sutton; Ben Ashenden
- Music by: Finn Keane and Nathan Klein, drawing on compositions by Ludwig van Beethoven
- Country of origin: United Kingdom
- Original language: English
- No. of series: 2
- No. of episodes: 12

Production
- Executive producers: Kenton Allen; Chris Sussman; Kathryn O'Connor; Mark Brotherhood; David Mitchell; Saurabh Kakkar
- Producer: Georgie Fallon
- Running time: 56 minutes
- Production companies: Big Talk; That Mitchell and Webb Company

Original release
- Network: BBC One
- Release: 25 September 2024 – present

Ludwig is a British detective dramedy television series starring David Mitchell and Anna Maxwell Martin. It premiered on BBC One on 25 September 2024 and returned for a second series on 20 August 2026. The BBC confirmed in July 2026 that a third series has been commissioned. In September 2026 it was announced that there will be a Christmas special of the series in December 2026, featuring David Suchet.

== Premise ==
John Taylor is a reclusive puzzle maker who publishes puzzle books under the pen name "Ludwig". His identical twin brother, James Taylor, is a successful detective chief inspector in the Cambridge police force. James has gone missing, and his wife Lucy, a childhood friend of both brothers, enlists John's help to solve the mystery. Pretending to be his brother, John infiltrates the local police station to investigate; inadvertently, he becomes embroiled in solving other cases.

== Cast and characters ==
=== Main ===
- David Mitchell as John "Ludwig" Taylor/DCI James Taylor
  - Jakub Bednarczyk as Young John/Young James
- Anna Maxwell Martin as Lucy Betts-Taylor, John's sister-in-law
- Dylan Hughes as Henry Betts-Taylor, James and Lucy's son
- Dipo Ola as DI/DCI Russell Carter
- Dorothy Atkinson as DCS Carol Shaw
- Ralph Ineson as Chief Constable Ronan Ziegler (series 1 and 2)
- Gerran Howell as DC Simon Evans (series 1)
- Izuka Hoyle as DS Alice Finch (series 1)
- Sophie Willan as IT technician Holly Pinder (series 1)
- Ben Ashenden as DC Ethan Cole (series 2 – present)
- Rumi Sutton as DC Caitlin Sullivan (series 2 – present)
- Mark Bonnar as newspaper editor Gareth Fisher (series 2 – present)
- Sian Clifford as Joanne Kemper MP (series 2 – present)

=== Featured ===
The following actors are credited in the opening titles of one episode in a series:

- Derek Jacobi as teacher Mr Todd (series 1)
- Stephen Merchant as snooker player Danny Sloane (series 2)

=== Guest ===
- Felicity Kendal as Lady Camilla Bryce (series 1)
- Hammed Animashaun as Ross Barclay (series 1)
- Ella Bruccoleri as Megan Rowland (series 1)
- Amanda Lawrence as Julie Tate (series 1)
- Paul Chahidi as Adrian Tate (series 1)
- Allan Mustafa as Gary Jennings (series 1)
- Karl Pilkington as DI Matt Neville (series 1 and 2)
- Sam Swainsbury as sportsmaster Mr Bishop (series 1)
- Rose Ayling-Ellis as deputy head Ms Freya Chordwell (series 1)
- Josh Bolt as Adam Newsum (series 1 and 2)
- Doon Mackichan as Portia Lowery (series 2)
- Rebecca Front as her sister, Patricia Lowery (series 2)
- Michael Wildman as DCC Clint Radley (series 2)

== Episodes ==
=== Series overview ===
Series	Episodes	Originally released	
Series	Episodes	First released	Last released
1	6	25 September 2024	30 October 2024
2	6	20 August 2026	10 September 2026

=== Series 1 (2024) ===
No.	Title	Directed by	Written by	Original release date	UK viewers (millions)
1	"Episode 1"	Robert McKillop	Mark Brotherhood	25 September 2024	6.01
DCI James Taylor, working for the Cambridge Police Authority, mysteriously disappears. His wife Lucy asks her brother-in-law John, a reclusive puzzle setter, to help find his whereabouts. John and James are identical twins, so John poses as James to infiltrate the police office to pick up clues. While there, he is roped into solving an unconnected murder of a local property lawyer, which he solves by treating it as a logic puzzle. Afterwards, he finds James' notebook in the office, which has an undecipherable cipher.
2	"Episode 2"	Robert McKillop	Mark Brotherhood	2 October 2024	6.15
Still posing as James, John investigates a man's disappearance at a team-building seminar in a stately home. He solves the crime, but Lucy reminds him that his main task is to find James.
3	"Episode 3"	Robert McKillop	Mark Brotherhood	9 October 2024	6.34
A city tour guide is murdered, leading John to test his logic about what could have happened on the tour to lead to that. Lucy conducts her own investigation into a case whose details were left by James in an old fax machine and found by John and Lucy in the previous episode.
4	"Episode 4"	Jill Robertson	Mark Brotherhood	16 October 2024	6.64
John gets caught up in the investigation of a suspicious death on a building site. While the death seems random due to the erratic work rota system, he believes it to be murder due to a cross-wired, water-soaked generator.
5	"Episode 5"	Jill Robertson	Mark Brotherhood	23 October 2024	6.99
A school headmaster is found hanged in his study, and nearby is an apparent suicide note. John, who had attended a similar school with James, is convinced the headmaster was murdered. However, because the headmaster's office door had been locked from the inside, with no other means of exit, all evidence points to suicide. John attempts to solve the case with the assistance of his former teacher and mentor Mr Todd, who has moved to this school and is now holding a sinecure due to apparent senility. After they piece together a scenario that points to a murder suspect, Mr Todd, also an expert on puzzles, deduces that John is impersonating James. Later, Lucy receives a strange phone call giving an address, and leaves the house to investigate.
6	"Episode 6"	Jill Robertson	Mark Brotherhood	30 October 2024	7.15
Holly Pinder, the police technology specialist, is found dead in her flat. Lucy, found at the scene holding a knife that is later proved to be the murder weapon, is arrested. Questioned by DI Carter, Lucy denies the killing, and claims that she was there because she had received a phone call from Holly (or someone impersonating her). CC Ziegler demands that the matter be resolved without involving the media, because of a public talk he is giving concerning the Sinclair case. When Carter questions John (still passing as James) about the nature of his relationship with Holly, John confesses he has been impersonating his brother. Evidence in Holly's flat discloses that she was conducting her own investigation. John battles to prove Lucy's innocence. Angry at James for abandoning his family, John questions whether finding his brother is worth the effort. Carter fills in Shaw about all they know of James's disappearance. Evans thinks Holly's earlier comment about a kiss from James may have been a test to determine whether he was actually James or not. Holly's alleged boyfriend Adam confesses he was not her lover but was helping her gather and sell classified information to private clients. James had been taken off the Sinclair case, but persisted in investigating, after which Holly planned to blackmail him. She then realised that James was actually John and decided to blackmail Lucy. The documents and files taken from Sinclair's house never got to Scotland Yard as intended. Cambridge Police contrive James's resignation so that the murder cases solved by John (as James) are not reopened. John receives a cryptic phone call from James, leading him to Sinclair's hidden files. John is re-engaged as a paid consultant to solve crimes, easily solving the mystery of a man drowning in the middle of a multistorey car park.

=== Series 2 (2026) ===
No.	Title	Directed by	Written by	BBC iPlayer release date	BBC One broadcast	UK viewers (millions)
7	"Episode 1"	George Kane	Mark Brotherhood	20 August 2026	20 August 2026	6.61
An elderly theatre-goer is murdered but the two suspects both confess, leaving John with a "who-didn't-do-it?" to solve. The local MP, Joanne Kemper, is a witness who hopes to avoid negative publicity. At home, John starts looking for a "needle in a haystack" in the piles of papers relating to the Sinclair case, which John's brother James had been working on until his disappearance. To aid in her own investigations, Lucy offers her services to the East Anglian Advertiser to gain press accreditation, gaining a "freelance" role after promising the editor Gareth Fisher that Ludwig can provide two puzzles a week.
8	"Episode 2"	George Kane	Mark Brotherhood	20 August 2026	27 August 2026	6.18
A wedding guest is murdered, seemingly in full view of forty other guests. Confused by the number of variables involved, John is inspired to treat the cèilidh performed at the time of death as a more complex gear puzzle. Meanwhile the Taylors investigate the role of Joanne Kemper MP in a "statistically significant" number of coincidences connected to past murders and suicides (with one of Sinclair's files having claimed that the Kemper family engaged in ritual blood sacrifices once every ten years).
9	"Episode 3"	George Kane	Mark Brotherhood	20 August 2026	3 September 2026	6.29
A fashion influencer is murdered in a Cambridge courtyard. John "pops in" to the police HQ to steal a restricted incident report from the computer but is thwarted. At the same time he solves the murder case by treating the Cambridge street and CCTV networks as a maze puzzle. DCI Carter works out which report John was looking for and hands him a copy, in exchange for a promise from John to "compare notes" on the Sinclair case and Kemper's role in it, not least because the death of his fiancée (who was Ziegler's daughter) is the third one in the '04-'14-'24 chain of "one every ten years".
10	"Episode 4"	Stella Corradi	Mark Brotherhood	10 September 2026	10 September 2026	N/A
A snooker player is found dead, stabbed in the back. The obvious suspect, his rival, has an alibi: he was on camera celebrating a match victory over the dead man. To solve this one, John has to learn to think like a snooker player. Meawhile, Lucy uses her concocted press credentials to interview Joanne Kemper, despite a phone call from the missing James warning her to call it off. Just in time, John deciphers a line from a coded letter by James and passes the phrase "Knight's Path" to Lucy, who uses it in her interview to catch Kemper off guard. This buys time for the Taylors, who now fear that they are in a battle with Kemper. They later discover that "Knight's Pass" refers to the road where Mandy Ziegler died.
11	"Episode 5"	Stella Corradi	Mark Brotherhood	10 September 2026	17 September 2026	N/A
A data analyst, dining out with his colleagues in a sushi restaurant, dies of aconitine poisoning. Coincidentally, DCI Carter is holding a clandestine meeting with DI Matt Neville, James' colleague, in the restaurant and both of them witness the death, thus revealing to DCS Shaw, both men's superior officer, that Carter is investigating James' disappearance. Lucy confides in Fisher who helps her to find articles linking Kemper to the deaths of Mandy Ziegler and others. John, with Neville's help, interprets mathematical notes on a discarded napkin to identify the sushi poisoner. Neville reminisces that he used to help James in the same way, with the same lack of gratitude. Chief Constable Ziegler, who is officially on holiday, is not answering Carter's calls so Carter drives to his house to confront him with John and Lucy following him. They discover Ziegler's dead body.
12	"Episode 6"	Stella Corradi	Mark Brotherhood	10 September 2026	24 September 2026	N/A
John and Carter are assigned to the Ziegler case. John shares his knowledge with the Cambridge police team for the first time, albeit not correcting their misapprehension that he is an MI5 operative. The handgun left near Ziegler's body is quickly traced to Kemper, and Ziegler's security camera shows her leaving his house about the time of his death. John and Lucy are sceptical, not believing that Kemper would have left such obvious clues. At first they suspect James, until John interprets some inscriptions found in Ludwig puzzle books left at the scene – clues that had been intended to explain the death to DCI Carter. These reveal that Ziegler's death was suicide, caused by grief over the death of his daughter. Ziegler had stage-managed his own death in an attempt to frame Kemper, whom he suspected of causing several deaths including that of his daughter. Kemper's mysterious security man and police officer DCC Radley, now Acting Chief Constable, informs DCS Shaw and her team that the case has been taken over by a higher authority. Kemper walks free. Shaw's team meet at Fisher's newspaper office and vow to defeat the "baddies".

=== Christmas special (2026) ===
No.	Title	Directed by	Written by	Original release date	UK viewers (millions)
13	TBA	TBA	Mark Brotherhood	TBA	TBD
Guest starring David Suchet, Jason Flemyng, Joe Wilkinson, Cathy Tyson, Alexandra Roach and Kiell Smith-Bynoe

== Production ==
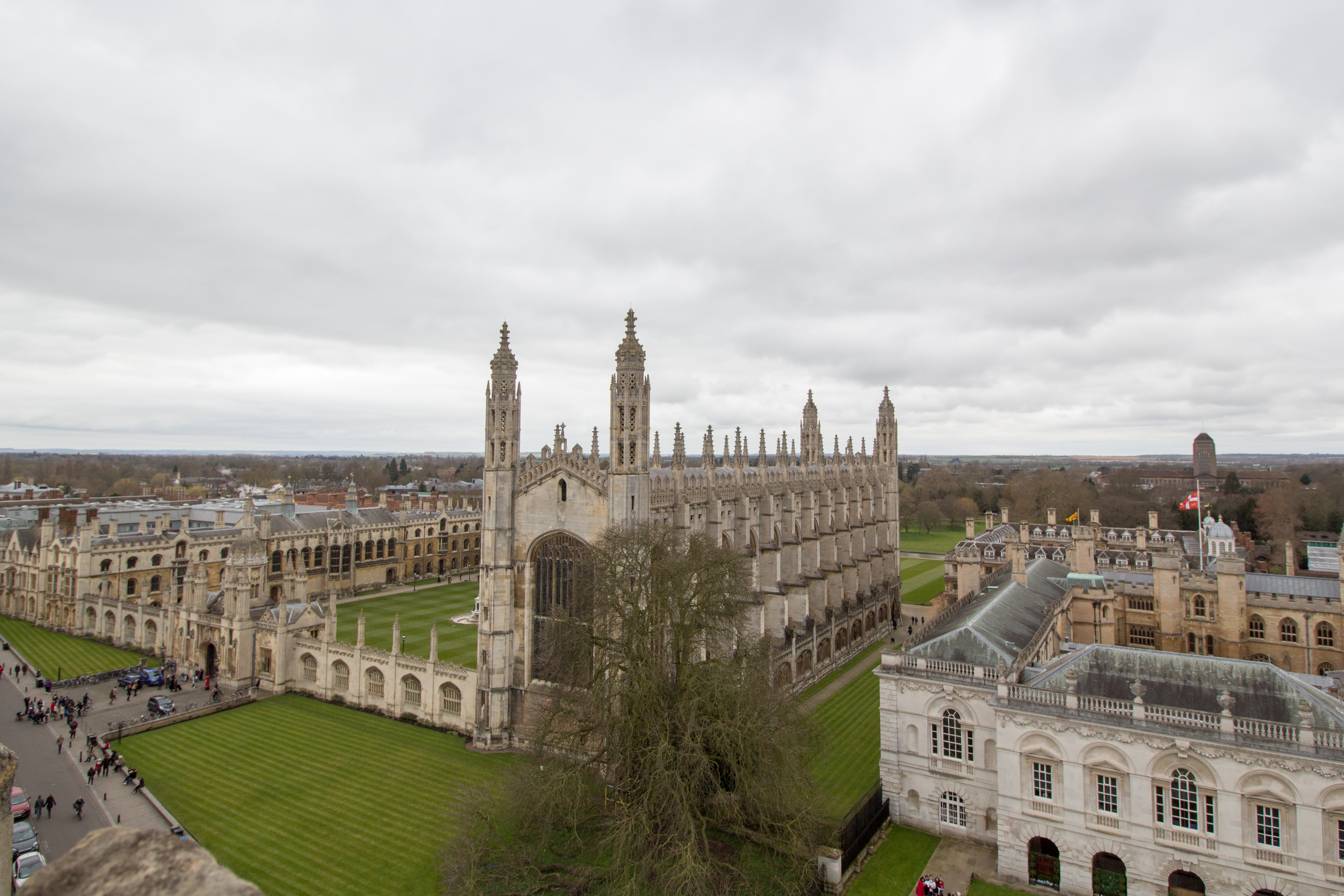
Filming took place in the English city of Cambridge and at other locations

The production company for the series is Big Talk, in association with That Mitchell and Webb Company. Mark Brotherhood wrote the script. Executive producers include Kenton Allen, Chris Sussman and Kathryn O'Connor. Mitchell is also an executive producer, along with script writer Brotherhood and Saurabh Kakkar. Directors are Robert McKillop and Jill Robertson.

In January 2024 Anna Maxwell Martin joined the cast, as well as Izuka Hoyle, Gerran Howell, Dipo Ola, Dorothy Atkinson and Dylan Hughes. Guest appearances in the first series included Karl Pilkington, Felicity Kendal, Hammed Animashaun, Paul Chahidi, Derek Jacobi, Allan Mustafa, Sam Swainsbury and Rose Ayling-Ellis.

The Guardian's crossword editor Alan Connor was involved in the design of the crosswords used in the opening titles of the series and created a series of Ludwig-themed puzzles in The Guardian.

Filming took place in London and Cambridge in January 2024. In September 2025, filming commenced on the second series, with Mark Bonnar, Sian Clifford, Ben Ashenden and Rumi Sutton all joining the cast as series regulars. The first episode of the second series was broadcast in August 2026.

Beethoven's Piano Sonata No. 17 "The Tempest" (III. Allegretto)
The music of Ludwig van Beethoven featured prominently in the series

Music for the series was composed by Finn Keane and Nathan Klein, using melodic material from compositions by Ludwig van Beethoven, including the "Tempest" Sonata, the "Moonlight" Sonata, the 3rd, 4th, 5th and 9th Symphonies, Für Elise and the Coriolan Overture.

In April 2026, it was reported that a third series of the show had been commissioned. The BBC confirmed this in July. As of July 2026, series 3 is currently being filmed and is due for broadcast in 2027.

In September 2026, a Christmas special was announced, starring David Suchet, Jason Flemyng, Joe Wilkinson, Cathy Tyson, Alexandra Roach and Kiell Smith-Bynoe.

In October 2026, it was reported that U.S. broadcast network ABC had ordered a pilot for an American adaptation titled Rabbit from co-writers Humphrey Ker and Megan Ganz.

== Broadcast ==
Series 1 was first broadcast in the United Kingdom on BBC One and BBC iPlayer, commencing on 25 September 2024. The first three episodes of series 2 were released on BBC iPlayer on 20 August 2026, with the first episode broadcast on BBC One at 9pm on the same date. The remaining three episodes are scheduled for broadcast on BBC One on consecutive Thursdays, and were released on BBC iPlayer on 10 September.

== Reception ==
Reviews from critics have been generally favourable. The show recorded almost 10 million viewers in the first month of airing. On the review aggregator website Rotten Tomatoes, Ludwig has (at August 2026) a 98% rating based on 41 reviews, with an average rating of 7.5/10. The site's critical consensus reads: "Cleverly plotted and a wonderful showcase for star David Mitchell's brainy charm, Ludwig is a thoroughly pleasant mystery series that stays light on its feet."

=== Series 1 ===
In a five-star review for The Telegraph, Anita Singh described the "cosy cryptic crime series" as a "comedy triumph". In a three-star review for The Guardian, Lucy Mangan said it was "like watching Peep Show's Mark join the police force". In a three-star review for The Independent, Louis Chilton said: "If you like Thursday Murder Club, you'll love this abject pap." Victoria Segal included the series in her "Best of 2024" list for The Sunday Times, saying that the series "felt fresh and funny; comfort viewing, yes, but cut with a dash of Nordic noir".

=== Series 2 ===
In a five-star Guardian review of the second series, Sarah Dempster said: "Ludwig is as sharp as it is cuddly, its bobbly pullover concealing a script (by series creator Mark Brotherhood) that revels in wordplay and the infinite micro-horrors of social awkwardness." Anita Singh of The Daily Telegraph also gave the second series five stars, describing it as "inventive and "funny" and "as brilliant as ever". Although "'[t]he weekly murder plots can be thin" said The Times' reviewer, the friendship between John Taylor and his sister-in-law Lucy is "a real pleasure".

However, in a three-star review for The Independent, Annabel Nugent described the second series as "the TV equivalent of a comforting but slightly tasteless cup of tea". Another three-star review for the Financial Times, (Rebecca Nicholson) said: "This second series continues in the same lively vein as the first, though it feels suddenly more quirky and gets a little bogged down in its own complicated subplot....”

== Accolades ==
The series won Best Comedy Series at the 53rd International Emmy Awards in November 2025.

The series was nominated for Best TV Comedy Drama at the Comedy.co.uk Awards in January 2025. The series won at the 2025 Broadcast Awards in the Best Comedy Programme category in February 2025. It was nominated for Best Comedy Drama at the Royal Television Society Programme Awards in March 2025. That month, the show was nominated for Scripted Comedy at the 2025 British Academy Television Awards. The series was nominated for New Drama at the National Television Awards. The series also received recognition at the 2025 Venice TV Awards, where it won the Comedy category. In November 2025, Robert McKillop was nominated for the Best Director (fiction) Award at the 2025 British Academy Scotland Awards.
