= Babylon (Mad Men) =

- Mad Men episode
- Episode no.: Season 1 Episode 6
- Directed by: Andrew Bernstein
- Written by: Andre Jacquemetton; Maria Jacquemetton
- Original air date: August 23, 2007
- Running time: 47 minutes

Guest appearances
- Rosemarie DeWitt as Midge Daniels; John Slattery as Roger Sterling; Talia Balsam as Mona Sterling; Ian Bohen as Roy Hazelitt; Rebecca Creskoff as Barbara Katz; Elizabeth Rice as Margaret Sterling; Irene Roseen as Lily Meyer; Joel Murray as Freddy Rumsen

Episode chronology
← Previous "5G"	Next → "Red in the Face"
- Mad Men season 1

"Babylon" is the sixth episode of the first season of the American television drama series Mad Men. It was written by Andre and Maria Jacquemetton and directed by Andrew Bernstein. The episode originally aired on the AMC channel in the United States on August 23, 2007.

== Plot ==
Don prepares breakfast in bed for Betty to celebrate Mother's Day, but trips and falls down the stairs. He has a vision of himself as a child, meeting his newborn half-brother Adam for the first time. That night, Betty is shocked at Joan Crawford's aging appearance in The Best of Everything, but Don chides her to not be melancholic when her thoughts turn to her deceased mother. He says that "mourning is just extended self-pity."

The next day, Don and Roger meet with the Israeli Board of Tourism. Don, unsure of what strategy to use to attract wealthy tourists, meets Rachel for lunch to seek her input because she is Jewish. Rachel keeps their meeting professional, but later confesses to her sister that she is developing feelings for Don. Meanwhile, Roger meets Joan in a hotel, revealing a year-long affair. Roger suggests that she move into an apartment for their affair but she refuses, saying she eventually will find a permanent romantic situation and Roger will leave her for someone younger.

Freddy Rumsen, working on a campaign for Belle Jolie, asks the Sterling Cooper secretaries to try the brand's lipsticks. The men spy on them from behind a one-way mirror. While most of the women enjoy the samples, Peggy tells Freddy she did not try any, saying she does not want to feel "like one of a hundred colors in a box" and refers to a trashcan full of the samples as a "basket of kisses." Impressed, Freddy relays Peggy's comments to the creative team and expresses she may have some writing talent. Freddy asks Peggy to write copy for the account.

Don visit Midge but they are interrupted by Midge's beatnik lover Roy Hazelitt. Roy ribs Don for his age, suburban life, and the emptiness of advertising and mass consumption, while Don ridicules Roy for his vanity and flightiness, during a visit to The Gaslight Cafe to watch Midge and Roy's friend, Ian, perform a song about the Jews mourning their exile from Zion. Elsewhere, Roger meets Joan in a hotel and presents a bird in a cage as a gift to her, expressing regret for not being exclusive with her. Joan is taken aback and appears conflicted about their relationship. Posing as strangers to avoid suspicion, Joan and Roger wait for separate taxis when leaving the hotel.

== Cultural references ==
Don reads The Best of Everything and later he and Betty discuss the film adaptation. Don and his co-workers also read and discuss the novel Exodus as research. Sal refers to a shade of lipstick as "Ethel Rosenberg pink." Rachel refers to the then-recent capture of Adolf Eichmann.

Joan references Canadian philosopher Marshall McLuhan's "The medium is the message" when talking to Peggy. This is an anachronism, since the episode is set in 1960 and McLuhan's book where he coined the phrase wasn't published until 1964.

Don asks Rachel to lunch, and she suggests the tea room at The Pierre. While The Pierre is a real hotel in New York (and, as of 2019, has been in continuous operation since 1930), it doesn't have any eatery that would be referred to as a "tea room", and Don & Rachel's lunch scene was not shot at the Pierre.

The song Babylon (Psalm 137 as arranged by Philip Hayes) has the same arrangement as Don McLean's version on his album American Pie from 1971, which is the earliest known release of it.

== First appearances ==
- Frederick "Freddy" Rumsen: an elderly copywriter at Sterling-Cooper.
- Roy Hazelitt: a beatnik who is cynical to Don.
- Mack Johnson: Adam and Don's stepfather.
- Abigail Whitman: Adam's biological mother, Don's stepmother and Mack's wife.
- Barbara Katz: Rachel Menken's sister.
- Margaret Sterling: Roger and Mona's daughter.

== Reception ==
The episode was received very positively by critics. Alan Sepinwall, writing for New Jersey's The Star-Ledger, praised its focus on the show's female characters, and in particular the progression of Peggy's story. Andrew Johnston, writing for Slant Magazine, considered it the show's "most entertaining" episode to date, and wrote that its ending "beautifully demonstrates the level of insight that makes Mad Men so special."

In December 2013, Emily VanDerWerff of The A.V. Club gave the episode a full "A" grade, writing retrospectively:

The episode includes the first major story for Joan, a triumph for Peggy, and a minor but hugely important story point for Rachel. It features Midge for a brief time, and it gives us a taste of both Betty’s view of the world (which seems haunted by her fear that her looks will fade) and the glimmerings of what relationship she has with Sally. It’s the first episode of the show that functions more or less as a guided tour of the women of Mad Men, and that’s a mode that the show would return to at least once per season for as long as it ran [...] They’re all struggling toward Utopia, a good place yet also a place that cannot be.
