= Rust Creek =

2018 film directed by Jen McGowan

- Theatrical release poster
- Directed by: Jen McGowan
- Written by: Julie Lipson
- Story by: Stu Pollard; Julie Lipson
- Produced by: Stu Pollard; Nicolaas Bertelsen; Harris McCabe
- Starring: Hermione Corfield; Jay Paulson; Sean O'Bryan; Micah Hauptman; Daniel R. Hill
- Cinematography: Michelle Lawler
- Edited by: David Hopper
- Music by: H. Scott Salinas
- Production company: Lunacy Productions
- Distributed by: IFC Films
- Release dates: May 3, 2018 (BFF); January 4, 2019 (United States)
- Running time: 108 minutes
- Country: United States
- Language: English

Rust Creek is a 2018 American crime thriller film directed by Jen McGowan and written by Julie Lipson. It is based on an original story by Lipson and Stu Pollard. Hermione Corfield stars as a college student who becomes lost while on a road trip and is hunted by criminals who believe her to be a witness to their crimes. It premiered at the 2018 Bentonville Film Festival and was released theatrically on January 4, 2019, by IFC Films.

== Plot ==
Sawyer Scott, a senior at Centre College, receives an offer for a job interview in Washington, D.C. Embarrassed that she may not get the job, Sawyer skips Thanksgiving with her family to travel to the interview without telling anyone about her plans. After encountering holiday traffic on I-64, she takes an alternate route but finds it partly closed off. Traveling even deeper into the Appalachian forest, Sawyer eventually turns around but is spotted by brothers Hollister and Buck, who are burying a body.

Concerned she might have seen them, the brothers follow Sawyer and find her studying a paper map. Initially offering help, the brothers soon become hostile when Sawyer rejects their invitation to dinner. Buck and Sawyer are both wounded with his knife during the struggle. The brothers pursue her into the woods for a short distance but turn back as night falls. Disoriented and injured, Sawyer spends the night in a ravine.

After receiving an abandoned vehicle report, county Sheriff O'Doyle questions Hollister and Buck, known local troublemakers, but they deny involvement with Sawyer's disappearance. The brothers later return to Sawyer's vehicle and dispose of it over an embankment in the woods, resuming their search for her. Sawyer finds the wreckage of her car and discovers her cell phone, but the phone has a dying battery and no cellular reception. Suffering from hunger, dehydration, and blood loss, Sawyer loses consciousness near a dumping ground in the woods and is discovered by Lowell, a meth cook who is cousin to Hollister and Buck. Lowell treats Sawyer's wounded leg and offers her food and water, but he binds her with ropes after she throws lye in his face in an escape attempt. The brothers arrive to discuss Lowell's upcoming batch of meth but are suspicious when Lowell disallows them from entering. After the brothers leave, Lowell explains that he is not holding Sawyer hostage but is waiting for the brothers to deliver the batch of meth so he can borrow their pickup and take her to safety. Sawyer relaxes and bonds with Lowell over a discussion of the chemistry involved with cooking meth, helping him prepare the batch.

At the sheriff's office, O'Doyle orders deputy Katz to ignore the missing vehicle report but allows Katz to contact the registered owner to put his mind at ease. When Kentucky State Police commander Slattery arrives, Katz relays the information he has gathered about Sawyer's disappearance. Slattery expresses displeasure with O'Doyle's handling of the case and demands action, angering O'Doyle. O'Doyle returns to Hollister and Buck and demands they find Sawyer, revealing his involvement with their meth operation. After Katz overhears a phone call between O'Doyle and the brothers, he tries to take the sheriff into custody, but O'Doyle kills him and has the brothers dispose of his body. When Slattery returns, O'Doyle "discovers" planted evidence that implicates Katz in Sawyer's disappearance and covers up Katz's murder. While Slattery mobilizes the state police, taking over the investigation from O'Doyle, the sheriff leaves to help with the brothers' meth delivery, planning to upstage the drug cartel that has been moving into the region.

The brothers arrive at Lowell's to pick up the batch of meth and discover Sawyer's footprints on his doorstep, and realize that she was with him. Lowell claims he has Sawyer "trained", instructing her to microwave a cup of coffee for him from a thermos earlier seen to contain anhydrous ammonia. The microwave explodes, killing Buck and badly injuring Lowell and Hollister, but Lowell shields Sawyer from the blast. Sawyer escapes while the trailer burns, and Lowell struggles to overpower Hollister. O'Doyle arrives and kills both cousins, then picks up Sawyer. Sawyer recognizes O'Doyle from an idiom he used previously in a conversation with Lowell which Sawyer overheard, and realizes his intentions are hostile, tipping her off. O'Doyle leads her to the titular Rust Creek and tries to drown her, but she stabs him with a weeding fork she slipped from Lowell's trailer earlier. Finally free of her pursuers, Sawyer limps with determination down the road as multiple state police cruisers converge behind her.

== Cast ==
- Hermione Corfield as Sawyer Scott, a college student who goes to Washington D.C. for a job interview only to get lost
- Jay Paulson as Lowell Pritchert, a meth cook who tries to protect and help Sawyer from Hollister and Buck
- Sean O'Bryan as Sheriff O'Doyle, a sheriff trying to investigate Sawyer's disappearance, who is later revealed to be in cahoots with Hollister and Buck
- Micah Hauptman as Hollister
- Daniel R. Hill as Buck
- Jeremy Glazer as Deputy Nick Katz, a local sheriff
- John Marshall Jones as Commander Douglas Slattery
- Laura Guzman as Charlotte
- Virginia Schneider as Donna
- Denise Dal Vera as Mrs. Gander

== Production ==
The script was written by Julie Lipson based on an original story by Stu Pollard, who also produced the film. The film was shot in and around Louisville, Kentucky but certain scenes early in the film are from Danville, KY, including the Trinity Episcopal Church, and Centre College.

== Release ==
The film premiered at the Bentonville Film Festival on May 3, 2018. The film won Best Thriller Feature at the 2018 San Diego International Film Festival. It was released to VoD by IFC Midnight Films services January 4, 2019.

On November 30, 2020, Rust Creek had its Netflix debut. The film spent more than a week on Netflix's top ten movies list.

== Reception ==
Rust Creek has an approval rating of 85% on Rotten Tomatoes based on 45 reviews. The site's critical consensus states: "Rust Creek subverts expectations with a surprisingly layered survival drama anchored in a rich setting and a gripping lead performance from Hermione Corfield." Metacritic, which uses a weighted average, assigned a score of 59 out of 100 based on 12 critics, indicating "mixed or average reviews".

== Accolades ==
List of accolades received by ‘’Rust Creek’’
Year	Award	Category	Recipients	Result
2018	Breckenridge Festival of Film Awards	Best Drama		Won
2018	Breckenridge Festival of Film Awards	Best Actress	Hermione Corfield	Won
2018	Breckenridge Festival of Film Awards	Best Director	Jen McGowan	Won
2018	Film Threat Award This	Best Director	Jen McGowan	Won
2018	Jefferson State Flixx Fest	Best Actress	Hermione Corfield	Won
2018	Rhode Island International Film Festival	Directorial Discovery Award	Jen McGowan	Won
2018	San Diego International Film Festival	Best Thriller		Won
