= Jay Moriarity =

American surfer

- Jay Moriarity

Personal information
- Born: June 16, 1978 Georgia, U.S.
- Died: June 15, 2001 (aged 22) Indian Ocean, off the Maldives coast
- Years active: 1987-2001

Surfing career
- Sport: Surfing
- Sponsors: O'Neill

Surfing specifications
- Stance: Regular (natural) foot
- Favorite waves: Mavericks (Half Moon Bay, California), Pleasure Point, (Santa Cruz, California)

Jay Moriarity (June 16, 1978 – June 15, 2001) was a surfer from Santa Cruz, California. He was an accomplished surfer, waterman, and adventurer. As a surfer, he made his reputation surfing Mavericks in Half Moon Bay, California. At age 16, he was made internationally famous when his wipeout at Mavericks was caught on film and made the cover of Surfer magazine. Although a successful competitor, Jay is remembered as a soul surfer, winning many sportsmanship awards throughout his career. A biopic of his life, Chasing Mavericks, was released in 2012.

== Life ==
Born in Augusta, Georgia, on June 16, 1978, Moriarity moved with his family to Santa Cruz, California, when he was just a baby. His father was an Army Ranger and traveled most of the time. Jay began surfing at age 9 and rode his first waves at Sewer Peak. Not limited to either a shortboard or a longboard, he was known as a versatile surfer who appreciated all aspects of surfing. This appreciation was rooted in an overall love for the ocean, seen in his accomplishments as a swimmer, paddler, diver, and fisherman. Achieving success in surfing as a youngster, he became increasingly interested in surfing Mavericks, north of Santa Cruz in Half Moon Bay. After intense physical and mental training with his friend and Mavericks regular Frosty Hesson, Jay began surfing Mavericks at just 15 years of age, and soon became a respected regular in the line-up. In 2001, Moriarity co-authored a book with Chris Gallagher entitled, The Ultimate Guide to Surfing. A film, Chasing Mavericks, directed by Curtis Hanson, chronicling the life of Moriarity was released on October 26, 2012, with Jonny Weston playing the role of Moriarity.

Moriarity died on the day before his 23rd birthday on June 15, 2001, in the Indian Ocean off the coast of the island Lohifushi in the Maldives, drowning in a freediving accident. He was in Lohifushi for an O'Neill photo shoot, went freediving alone and was not seen after. A search party recovered his body later that night.

== Memorial Paddleboard Race ==
Moriarity has an annual paddleboard race in his memory, the annual Jay Moriarity Paddleboard Race aka "The Jay Race" is held in Capitola. After his death a memorial was held for him at Pleasure Point. All of Jay's family, friends, his wife, Kim, and mentor Frosty, attended.

== See also ==
- Mavericks, California
- Chasing Mavericks (2012 film)
