= The Clean Up Crew =

2024 film by Jon Keeyes

- Release poster
- Directed by: Jon Keeyes
- Written by: Matthew Rogers
- Produced by: Stephen Braun; Kurt Ebner; Michael J. Rothstein; Richard Bolger; Conor Barry; Richard Clabaugh; Jordan Beckerman; Jordan Yale Levine
- Starring: Jonathan Rhys Meyers; Swen Temmel; Ekaterina Baker; Melissa Leo; Antonio Banderas
- Cinematography: Austin F. Schmidt
- Edited by: Rylan Rafferty
- Music by: Gerry Owens; Aoife O'Leary
- Production company: Yale Productions
- Distributed by: Saban Films
- Release date: August 20, 2024
- Running time: 95 minutes
- Country: United States
- Language: English

The Clean Up Crew is a 2024 American crime action comedy film written by Matthew Rogers and directed by Jon Keeyes. It stars Jonathan Rhys Meyers, Swen Temmel, Ekaterina Baker, Melissa Leo, and Antonio Banderas. It is about a crime scene cleanup crew that discovers a briefcase of money, only to find that their windfall has made them a target for gangsters and government agents.

The Clean Up Crew was released on video on demand by Sony Pictures Home Entertainment on August 20, 2024.

== Plot ==
After a crime scene cleanup crew discovers a briefcase full of money, they inadvertently enter into a war with a corrupt ruthless crime lord, hitmen, gangsters, and corrupt government agents, all of whom are intent on getting the money back.

== Cast ==
- Jonathan Rhys Meyers as Alex
- Swen Temmel as Chuck
- Ekaterina Baker as Meagan
- Melissa Leo as Siobhan
- Antonio Banderas as Gabriel
- Laurence Kinlan as Danny
- Andy Kellegher as Jack

== Production ==
In August 2022, it was announced that filming wrapped in Ireland and that Meyers, Leo and Banderas were cast in the film. In December 2022, it was announced that Baker, Kinlan and Kellegher were also cast in the film.

== Release ==
In January 2023, it was reported that Saban Films acquired global distribution rights in all territories but Spain and Italy. It was released by on VOD on August 20, 2024.

== Reception ==
Noah Berlatsky of Chicago Reader gave the film a positive review and wrote: "Keeyes's genius is taking Ritchie's hip camera cuts, profane hip dialogue, and hip split screen shenanigans and treating them all as if they aren't hip at all, but are instead camp goofs."

Hope Madden wrote in her negative review: "The Clean Up Crew is a comedy that’s not funny, a thriller with no thrills, and a flat action flick sutured together into a dizzyingly incoherent paycheck for a few actors who deserve better." Brian Orndorf concurred with Madden's criticism in his review for Blu-ray.com: "“The Clean Up Crew” is derivative and unpleasant, clearly struggling to generate a wild ride of colliding personalities and underworld events."
