= We Hunt Together =

- Genre: Crime; Drama; Thriller
- Created by: Gaby Hull
- Written by: Gaby Hull
- Starring: Babou Ceesay; Hermione Corfield; Eve Myles; Dipo Ola
- Composer: Jon Opstad
- Country of origin: United Kingdom
- Original language: English
- No. of series: 2
- No. of episodes: 12

Production
- Producer: Lisa Osborne
- Cinematography: Oli Russell; Michael Wood
- Editors: Helen Chapman; Steven Worsley
- Production company: BBC Studios Drama Productions

Original release
- Network: Alibi
- Release: 27 May 2020 – 9 June 2022

We Hunt Together is a British crime drama television series created by Gaby Hull. The series stars Babou Ceesay, Eve Myles, Hermione Corfield and Dipo Ola. The first series began its run on 27 May 2020 on Alibi. The second series was premiered on Alibi on 5 May 2022. The first series was shown by the BBC from 26 June 2023.

== Cast and characters ==
=== Main ===
- Babou Ceesay as DI Jackson Mendy
- Hermione Corfield as Frederica "Freddy" Lane
- Eve Myles as DS Lola Franks
- Dipo Ola as Babeni "Baba" Lenga
- Colin Morgan as Liam Gates (season 2)

=== Recurring ===
- Babirye Bukilwa as DC Dominique "Dom" Parkes
- Vicki Pepperdine as DSI Susan Smart
- Steffan Rhodri as Larry
- Sharlene Whyte as Gill Mendy
- Nico Mirallegro as Robert Miller (series 2)
- Angus Imrie as Henry Lane (series 2)

=== Guest ===
- Kris Marshall as Cian Fitzgerald (series 1)
- Tamzin Outhwaite as Shannon McBride (series 2)
- Michelle Bonnard as Professor Judy Hackwood (series 2)
- Ray Fearon as Chief Superintendent Lester Price (series 2)
- John McCrea as DC Ryan Parsons (series 2)

== Episodes ==
All episodes of the series are written by Gaby Hull.

=== Series 1 (2020) ===
No. overall	No. in season	Title	Directed by	Original release date
1	1	"Episode 1"	Carl Tibbetts	27 May 2020
2	2	"Episode 2"	Carl Tibbetts	28 May 2020
3	3	"Episode 3"	Carl Tibbetts	3 June 2020
4	4	"Episode 4"	Carl Tibbetts	4 June 2020
5	5	"Episode 5"	Jon Jones	10 June 2020
6	6	"Episode 6"	Jon Jones	11 June 2020

=== Series 2 (2022) ===
No. overall	No. in season	Title	Directed by	Original release date
7	1	"Episode 1"	Jonathan Teplitzky	5 May 2022
A jogger dies after being brutally stabbed and murdered by the "Birdman", a man dressed in a pigeon mask. DI Lola and DS Jackson get assigned to the homicide case of the jogger. The victim is revealed to be James O'Neil. A day before, James met Frederica while they were speed dating, and eventually had sex. However, Frederica kept on thinking about Baba and ending up compressing James's neck. James is being watched by someone outside and eventually leads up to his murder. Lola and Jackson interview James' wife and Freddy as part of the investigation but get nowhere. Meanwhile, Freddy sees a ring on a grave and also receives a written letter from someone, and also sees James' severed finger wrapped in bandages on which she puts the ring.
8	2	"Episode 2"	Jonathan Teplitzky	12 May 2022
DI Lola and DS Jackson question suspects, including Robert Miller, Robert Miller's employer and his friend. His friend reveals that he was obsessed with Frederica and he said that he would have sex with her till death. Shannon, a YouTube presenter who constantly talks negatively about Freddy, meets and degrades Freddy and leaves. The Birdman visits Shannon after she goes for a swim in her pool. Lola gets a call from Jackson and watches Shannon's show, to reveal a video which reveals that she has been tied and forced to read a script whilst crying, then her body is found after she drowned. Freddy realises that the killer is after Freddy's enemies. Freddy's friend reveals to Lola that Shannon and Freddy met. Eventually, the police find Robert's partial fingerprint on the chair that Shannon was tied to, and raid his house, but find his severed finger in a room on a bed, which says "Poor Robert, think again pigs". Freddy reads an encrypted message from a comment on Shannon's page using clues from the letter, which says "Dear Honeybee, The pervert Robert Miller won't bother you anymore, We should meet".
9	3	"Episode 3"	Jonathan Teplitzky	19 May 2022
10	4	"Episode 4"	Rebecca Rycroft	26 May 2022
The ambulance arrive and takes Dom to the hospital. Jackson sees a suspicious person in a Birdman mask leave the premises. He tries to catch up with him but the person escapes on a motorbike. Another Birdman escapes after Lola goes after them. Freddy gets a private call to deliver the news that Sheila, Freddy's former carer, has suffered a stroke, and she has an emotional flashback of when she was abused as a child. Liam finds the message, and Lola and Liam try to crack the password of the encrypted message. Freddy gets a random call at a telephone box, and sees a note to inform the killer of their next target. Freddy says Sheila's name and then hangs up the call. Freddy then takes the message to a locker. Jackson is informed that Dom has awakened. Jackson traces the bike which is registered to Chief Superintendent Price. Freddy visits the locker to see a note and a vial. Lola begins following Freddy and Liam, as her suspicions are aroused. Henry and Freddy drive together, while Henry reminisces about her dead sister, Frederica, and Freddy has a flashback of when she pushed Frederica into the lake. Jackson interviews Chief Superintendent Lester Price and reveals that the bike was stolen, but he confirms that he was not present at the murder. Freddy tries to kill Sheila, but an imaginative Baba stops her. Jackson receives a harrowing call from Dom informing him that the baby is not his. Lola discovers that Liam used her so that he can become financially stable. Henry and Freddy eventually have sex. Jackson is arrested but later released and finds out his family left him. Also Freddy tells the killer to stop following her.
11	5	"Episode 5"	Rebecca Rycroft	2 June 2022
The police and Lola obtain a search warrant to search Frederica's house, and she immediately goes to the bathroom. DS Jackson is suspended after an incident with the police. She flushes the letter down the toilet, and swallows the severed finger. However, later during a police interrogation, the police ask Freddy about the Twitter post and Shannon's visit, and later vomits the finger into the sink. She decides to hide the finger in the inside pocket of her jacket. Freddy reveals that she received the letter from someone unknown. Lola and her supervisor believe that Freddy could be in danger. Freddy and Henry decide to go on a boat trip. Freddy finds it uncomfortable to reveal the truth about his sister's death. Henry gets a call on Freddy's phone to inform him that Sheila passed away after Freddy's visit. Liam apologises to Lola but Lola does not reciprocate. Lola finds out that Price paid for the locker. Lola visits Jackson for help but he acts cold-heartedly. The police search his house, but the police discover that he has a second house in Gloucestershire, and eventually they find Price and his wife dead in a bath. They conclude that Lester was the Birdman, and committed suicide out of guilt. One night, Freddy imagines Henry's sister alive, and runs out of the boat, accidentally stabbing Henry. Freddy apologises and reveals the truth to Henry about his sister, then she brutally stabs him. She then drives back to her flat in his car. She then suddenly receives a call from Henry's phone, and the "Birdman" texts her. The Birdman takes off his mask, revealing himself to be Robert, who is alive. Robert then disposes of Henry's body.
12	6	"Episode 6"	Rebecca Rycroft	9 June 2022
Robert drives through a forest and reminisces about his time at the psychiatric hospital. His tyre goes flat. As he finishes changing it a van passes him. The driver, Joseph, gets out and talks to him in a friendly manner. Joseph opens the boot and is horrified to see Henry's dead body. Robert puts on the Birdman mask and then murders Joseph. Lola tells her supervisor that Price has an alibi. The killer sends a message to Freddy to meet him at the abandoned hospital. She arrived to discover Robert, who plays a trick to earn her trust. Jackson unofficially investigates the teddy bear from the jogger's murder and it leads to Amanda, a missing person. Dom interviews her husband but gets nowhere. Meanwhile, at the hospital, Freddy sees the Birdman, and removes the mask to reveal a dead Henry. Robert then incapacitates Freddy after she reveals her love for Henry. Robert reveals that this is his gift to her and she kisses him for it. Liam finds the password and reveals to Lola a message about the hospital, and she leaves. Robert takes Freddy to a high tower and threatens to kill her, but she smartly stabs him. Jackson deduces that Robert is the Birdman and messages Lola. Lola rushes out and finds Robert holding Liam at knifepoint. He then stabs him in the neck, and drives off. Jackson calls Dom to send an armed unit to Robert's house and an excavation team to the hospital. Just as he pulls his car around front, Robert's van crashes into him. Jackson rushes to Liam and sees Freddy attending to him. Lola later interviews Freddy and thanks her for saving Liam, but then reveals that one of the birdwatching cameras captured her stabbing Henry. Lola reconciles with Jackson for his help in the investigation, but they receive an anonymous letter telling them that unless Freddy is released, others will die.

== Release ==
The first series premiered in the United Kingdom on Alibi on 27 May 2020. The second series debuted on Alibi on 5 May 2022.

The series premiered in the United States on Showtime on 9 August 2020. The second series debuted on Showtime on 3 July 2022.

== Reception ==
On the review aggregator website Rotten Tomatoes, 55% of 11 critics' reviews of the first season are positive, with an average rating of 4.7/10. Metacritic, which uses a weighted average, assigned the first season a score of 59 out of 100, based on nine critics, indicating "mixed or average reviews".
