= Cold Copy =

2023 film by Roxine Helberg

- Theatrical release poster
- Directed by: Roxine Helberg
- Written by: Roxine Helberg
- Produced by: Daniel Bekerman; Justin Lothrop; Brent Stiefel; Roxine Helberg; Amanda Verhagen
- Starring: Bel Powley; Tracee Ellis Ross; James Tupper; Ekaterina Baker; Nesta Cooper; Jacob Tremblay
- Cinematography: Matteo Cocco
- Edited by: Arndt-Wulf Peemöller
- Music by: Tóti Guðnason
- Production companies: Votiv Films; Scythia Films; Needle's Eye Productions; ShivHans Pictures; 30West; Carte Blanche
- Distributed by: Vertical
- Release dates: June 11, 2023 (Tribeca); January 26, 2024 (United States)
- Running time: 96 minutes
- Country: United States
- Language: English

Cold Copy is a 2023 American thriller film written and directed by Roxine Helberg and starring Bel Powley, Tracee Ellis Ross, James Tupper, Ekaterina Baker, Nesta Cooper, and Jacob Tremblay. It is Helberg's feature directorial debut.

Cold Copy was released on 26 January 2024.

== Plot ==
An ambitious journalism student falls under the yoke of a renowned but ruthless journalist whom she strives to impress, even if it means manipulating her latest article and the very idea of truth.

== Cast ==
- Bel Powley as Mia Scott
- Tracee Ellis Ross as Diane Heger
- Jacob Tremblay as Igor Nowak
- Nesta Cooper as Kim
- Ekaterina Baker as Alix
- James Tupper as Alexsy

== Production ==
In September 2022, it was announced that filming had wrapped.

== Release ==
Cold Copy premiered at the Tribeca Film Festival on June 11, 2023. In October 2023, Vertical Entertainment acquired distribution rights to the film.

The film was released in select theaters and on VOD on January 26, 2024.

== Reception ==
On the review aggregator website Rotten Tomatoes, 33% of 18 critics' reviews are positive, with an average rating of 5.4/10.

Damon Wise of Deadline Hollywood gave the film a positive review and wrote, "Just lately, with the exception of Dan Gilroy's Nightcrawler (2014), there hasn't been too much evidence of a renaissance, but Roxine Hellberg's satisfying feature debut taps back into the same dark wells of oral ambivalence corruption and power, casting the excellent Bel Powley as a journalism student who will do whatever it takes to make it in the cut-throat world of TV news broadcasting".

Christian Zilko of IndieWire graded the film a C− and wrote, "With so many new journalism stories begging to be told, there's simply no reason to retread old ones this poorly". Lex Briscuso of TheWrap gave the film a negative review and wrote, "Cold Copy is a tense journalism drama that ultimately can't be saved by a group of strong leads who are running lengths with the material they've been given".
