= Jay Paulson =

American actor

- Born: New York City, U.S.
- Occupations: Film, television actor

Jay Paulson is an American actor and poet.

== Early life and education ==
Paulson was born in New York City.

== Career ==
Paulson's first major television role was a regular recurring role as Zoe's boyfriend, Sean, on the comedy Cybill. He appeared in ten episodes of Season 2 and returned for a couple of episodes of Season 3.

Paulson starred in the film Rust Creek and Rolling Kansas. He also appeared in other films, including Go, Can't Hardly Wait, and Imaginary Heroes.

He is known for his work as Don Draper's long lost brother Adam Whitman on the AMC series Mad Men.

He played Chaplain Tappman in George Clooney's remake of Catch-22.

He is a frequent collaborator of Gerry Fialka and has appeared in his two films, 'The Brother Side of the Wake' and 'The Mother Side of the Wake', both of which were produced by Bruno Kohfield-Galeano.

== Filmography ==
=== Film ===
Year	Title	Role	Notes
1997	Academy Boyz	Kirk McCormick	
1998	Permanent Midnight	Phoenix Punk	
1999	Go	Loop	
1999	Total Stranger	Alan	
1999	Dancing with Agnes	Vern	Short
2002	Waiting River	Waki	
2003	Rolling Kansas	Dave Murphy	
2004	Burning Annie	Sam	
2004	Imaginary Heroes	Vern	
2004	Honor Among Thieves	Cash	Short
2005	Partner(s)	John	
2006	In Memory of Rusty	James Von Carmen	Short
2007	Cul de Sac	Stuart	
2009	The Marc Pease Experience	Gerry	
2011	Red & Blue Marbles	Ron	
2012	Black Rock	Derek	
2013	Lucky Bastard	Dave G.	
2018	Rust Creek	Lowell Pritchert	
2019	The Laundromat	Pastor Conners	
2023	Killers of the Flower Moon	Car Salesman	
2023	Knox Goes Away	Detective Gelfuso	

=== Television ===
Year	Title	Role	Notes
1995–96	Cybill	Sean	Recurring role (seasons 2–3)
1997	NYPD Blue	Sam DePaul	"Three Girls and a Baby"
1997	Just Shoot Me!	Kit	"Sweet Charity"
1999	The Apartment Complex	Bones	TV film
1999	Anna Says	Donnie	TV series
2000	Battery Park	Det. Carl Zernial	Main role
2001	The Invisible Man	Jeffries	"Perchance to Dream"
2001	Bob Patterson	Les	"Pilot"
2001	Kristin	Richie	"The Showdown"
2005	The West Wing	Roger	"King Corn"
2005	Blue Skies	Matthew	TV film
2006	Studio 60 on the Sunset Strip	Deputy Roger Boone	"Nevada Day: Parts 1 & 2"
2007	Mad Men	Adam Whitman	"5G", "Indian Summer"
2007–08	October Road	Philip Farmer	Main role
2008	CSI: Crime Scene Investigation	Leo Finley / Dean James	"A Thousand Days on Earth"
2010	Happy Town	Eli 'Root Beer' Rogers	Main role
2011	Criminal Minds: Suspect Behavior	Marcus Lee Graham	"Lonely Hearts"
2011	Castle	Eddie McUsic	"Law & Murder"
2011	Identity	Jose Rodriguez	TV film
2012	Mad Men	Adam Whitman	"The Phantom"
2012	Bones	Seth Zalinsky	"The But in the Joke"
2013	Longmire	Cal Weston	"The Great Spirit"
2013	The Glades	Carl Stewart	"Civil War"
2014	Major Crimes	Dr. Frank Wilshaw	"Zoo Story"
2014	Bleach	Alan Barnes	TV film
2015	Zoo	Leo Butler	"Blame It on Leo"
2015	The Whispers	Thomas Harcourt	"A Hollow Man", "Broken Child"
2016	Turn: Washington's Spies	Elias	"Blade on the Feather"
2016	Lopez	Josh Banks	"George Gets Roasted", "George Goes All In"
2016	Scorpion	Connor	"Sly and the Family Stone"
2017	Grimm	Randy Goode	"Blind Love"
2018	Electric Dreams	Rev. Perine	"Autofac"
2018	Beyond	Edgar	Recurring role (season 2)
2019	I Am the Night	Ohls	TV miniseries
2019	Catch-22	Chaplain Tappman	Main role (4 episodes)
2020	The George Lucas Talk Show	Himself	Stu-D2 1138 on the Binary Sunset Sith (Studio 60 on the Sunset Strip marathon)
