= 5G (Mad Men) =

- Mad Men episode
- Episode no.: Season 1 Episode 5
- Directed by: Lesli Linka Glatter
- Written by: Matthew Weiner
- Original air date: August 16, 2007
- Running time: 48 minutes

Guest appearances
- Jim Abele as Jack Konig; Anne Dudek as Francine Hanson; Andy Hoff as Charlie Fiddich; Alison Brie as Trudy Campbell; Jay Paulson as Adam Whitman

Episode chronology
← Previous "New Amsterdam"	Next → "Babylon"
- Mad Men season 1

"5G" is the fifth episode of the first season of the American television drama series Mad Men. It was written by series creator Matthew Weiner and directed by Lesli Linka Glatter. The episode originally aired on the AMC channel in the United States on August 16, 2007. It is the first episode to deal with the series' long-running story arc of Don's dual identities.

== Plot ==
Don wins an industry award and is photographed for Advertising Age. This prompts Adam Whitman to show up to Sterling Cooper, surprising Don. Adam recognizes him as Dick Whitman, his long-lost half-brother, but Don claims he does not know who Adam is. Later, at a diner, Don admits the truth and admits he missed Adam. When Don asks about his family, Adam reveals their mother died from cancer and Don coldly remarks, "Good." Don tells Adam he has no place for him in his life and leaves.

Don and his team come up with the Executive Account, a secret discretionary account for men that their wives don't know about, as an ad campaign for Liberty Capital Savings. Don is surprised by a call from Midge, and Peggy accidentally overhears them arrange to meet for sex. Betty and the children arrive at Sterling Cooper while Don is meeting Adam at the diner: a desperate Peggy, thinking Don is with Midge, covers for his absence. She tells Joan about Midge, who advises her to feign ignorance to Betty and Don.

Meanwhile, Ken Cosgrove announces one of his short stories was published in Atlantic Monthly: this makes Pete and Paul jealous, and they each seek to publish their own stories. Pete asks Trudy to visit her ex-boyfriend Charlie Fiddich, who works in publishing, to publish Pete's story in The New Yorker. Charlie incorrectly interprets his meeting with Trudy to start an affair, but she resists his advances. Charlie only agrees to publish the story in Boys' Life. This angers Pete, who states his story was good enough for The New Yorker and that Trudy should have done "whatever" to publish his story. This upsets Trudy, who asks him, "Why would you do that to me?"

Don receives a letter from Adam listing his hotel room number ("5G") and a photo of them depicting Adam as a child and Don as a soldier. Don burns the photograph. At the hotel, Don dismisses Adam but gives him $5,000 to leave New York and never contact him again. Adam is heartbroken, but Don explains he has too much to lose by revealing his past. Adam embraces him and Don leaves. That night, Don tells Betty they are not currently financially able to afford a summer home.

== First appearances ==
- Adam Whitman: a janitor who tries to reunite with his half-brother, Don.

== Cultural references ==
Midge calls Don at work under the guise of jazz musician Bix Beiderbecke.

== Reception ==
The episode was received positively by critics. Alan Sepinwall, writing for New Jersey's The Star-Ledger, was a fan of the episode, praising the mystery of Don's identity and writing that the subplot involving Ken's short story left him "delighted." Andrew Johnston, writing for Slant Magazine, also praised the deepening of Don's backstory, and wrote that the series was finding its voice as "a comedy of manners." Emily VanDerWerff, writing for The A.V. Club in 2013, praised the emotional core of the story, but called the episode "over-obvious and [lacking] the subtext that really makes this show sing when it's working."
