= The Tutor (film) =

2023 film by Jordan Ross

- Theatrical release poster
- Directed by: Jordan Ross
- Written by: Ryan King
- Produced by: Christopher Kopp; Joey Stanton; Robert Ogden Barnum; Eric Binns
- Starring: Garrett Hedlund; Noah Schnapp; Victoria Justice; Jonny Weston
- Cinematography: Brian Rigney Hubbard
- Edited by: Chris Witt
- Music by: Alexander Bornstein
- Production company: Guns at Dawn
- Distributed by: Vertical Entertainment
- Release date: March 24, 2023
- Running time: 92 minutes
- Country: United States
- Language: English

The Tutor is a 2023 American psychological thriller film directed by Jordan Ross, written by Ryan King, and starring Garrett Hedlund, Noah Schnapp, Victoria Justice, and Jonny Weston. The film's plot follows a professional tutor (Hedlund) who becomes disturbed by his obsessive student (Schnapp) after accepting a job at a remote mansion.

Production and casting were announced in 2022, with principal photography taking place in Atlanta, Georgia. The film was released by Vertical Entertainment on March 24, 2023, and received negative reviews from critics.

== Premise ==
When professional tutor Ethan Campbell accepts a job at a remote mansion, he soon finds himself battling his disturbed student's obsessions, which threaten to expose his darkest secrets and unravel his carefully crafted personality.

== Cast ==
- Garrett Hedlund as Ethan
- Noah Schnapp as Jackson
- Victoria Justice as Annie
- Jonny Weston as Gavin
- Ekaterina Baker as Teddi
- Jenna D'Angelo as Miriam
- Kabby Borders as Jenny
- Exie Booker as Detective Landry
- Michael Aaron Milligan as Josh
- Joseph Castillo-Midyett as Chris
- Kamran Shaikh as Charles the butler

== Production ==
In April 2022, it was reported that Garrett Hedlund, Noah Schnapp, Victoria Justice , and Jonny Weston were cast in the film and principal photography was underway in Birmingham, Alabama.

== Release ==
The Tutor premiered in theaters on March 24, 2023. It was added to Netflix on July 8, 2023.

== Reception ==
On the review aggregator website Rotten Tomatoes, 18% of 28 critics' reviews are positive, with an average rating of 4.4/10. The website's consensus reads: "Despite its engaging beginning, The Tutor may have benefitted from fewer plot holes and some lessons in moviemaking to rise above the watchable popcorn thriller curve."

Julian Roman of MovieWeb gave the film a mixed review and wrote, "The film suffers from major logic flaws but keeps you hooked to a pulpy climax with a devilish turn." Jon Mendelsohn of Comic Book Resources gave the film a negative review and wrote, "The Tutor is a mildly entertaining thriller that convolutes itself with too many twists." Keith Garlington of the Arkansas Democrat-Gazette gave the film a positive review and wrote, "But for those able to avoid the traps of over-critiquing or even overthinking, The Tutor captures much of what people enjoy about these popular popcorn thrillers."
