= Femme Fatales (TV series) =

Television series

- Genre: Thriller
- Created by: Mark A. Altman; Steven Kriozere
- Starring: Tanit Phoenix
- Theme music composer: Gemma Ray
- Composer: Joe Kraemer
- Country of origin: United States
- Original language: English
- No. of seasons: 2
- No. of episodes: 28

Production
- Executive producers: Mark A. Altman; Steven Kriozere; Mark Gottwald
- Camera setup: Red One digital film; Single-camera
- Running time: 25–30 minutes
- Production companies: Four Amigos Entertainment; Radioactive Fishtank; HBO Entertainment

Original release
- Network: Cinemax
- Release: May 13, 2011 – August 10, 2012

Femme Fatales is an anthology television series, inspired by the men's magazine of the same name, that aired on Cinemax from 2011 to 2012. Each episode features an antiheroic woman, intercut with softcore pornographic scenes. Lilith (Tanit Phoenix) introduces each episode Rod Serling-style and occasionally appears within the narrative. Some characters make encore appearances in later episodes. Unlike most shows that feature porn actors, Femme Fatales features mainstream actors, such as Richard Kind, Adam Goldberg, Paul Mazursky, Ryan Bittle, Robert LaSardo, Stephen Macht, William Gregory Lee, Dean Haglund, Charlie O'Connell, Daniel Bess, Angus Scrimm, Carrie Genzel, Ellie Cornell, Neil Hopkins in season 1; and Antonio Sabàto Jr., Kyle Gass, Leilani Sarelle, Chris Mulkey, Scheana Shay, John Enos III, Vivica A. Fox, Sandra McCoy, Jeffrey Combs, Robert Picardo, Ashley Hamilton, Nikki Griffin, Eric Roberts, Kate Luyben, Steve Railsback, Paul Rae, Jes Macallan, Casper Van Dien, Jeff Fahey, and Betsy Rue in season 2.

== Premise ==
Women find extraordinary ways of coping with their problems, channeling their survival instincts and bringing out their inner guile. The show is inspired by and styled in the tradition of pulp stories, film noir and graphic novels, and takes place in contemporary settings. Each episode is introduced by the mysterious and enigmatic hostess Lilith and features different casts and storylines, some of which are intertwined.

== Cast ==
=== Main cast ===
- Tanit Phoenix as Lilith

=== Notable guest stars ===
- Ariauna Albright as Dream Woman
- Ana Alexander as Camille Gardner
- Sadie Alexandru as Janelle
- Crystal Allen as Rhonda Temple
- Mark A. Altman as the Voice of the Desk Clerk
- Catherine Annette as Tiffany
- Domiziano Arcangeli as Chaka
- Scott Bailey as Greg Cooper
- Carlee Baker as Beth Odets
- Cameron Bender as Tom Lomax
- Daniel Bess as Logan Cale
- Ryan Bittle as Archie Becker
- Philip Boyd as Nick
- Walker Brandt as Amy
- J.C. Brandy as Maxine
- Tiffany Brouwer as Holly Brown
- David Bygrave as Boyfriend
- Daniel Capellaro as Todd Voight
- Tina Casciani as Barbara
- Jeffrey Combs as the Voice of the Interrogator
- Rick Copp as Richard Hollis / Teacher
- Ellie Cornell as Detective Janet Wright
- Mark Costello as Detective Mitchum
- Marc Crumpton as Foster Prentiss
- Stephanie Danielson as Emily
- Kristen DeLuca as Beverly Dietrich
- Asher Deva as Ricardo
- James Devoti as Cam
- Andrew Dickler as R.J.
- Casper Van Dien as Joe Hallenbeck
- Danica Dillon as Caroline / Virginia
- Charles Divins as Dr. Troy
- Christine Donlon as Violet MacReady
- Sean Douglas as Pressman
- Daphnée Duplaix as Alexis
- Madison Dylan as Alexis
- Kiko Ellsworth as Detective Carter Judson
- John Enos III as Gil Flood
- Jeff Fahey as Detective McAllister
- Tammy Felice as Kim
- Gigi Feshold as Bebe
- Chanon Finley as Lisa Bannion
- Jon Fleming as Aaron
- Raymond Forchion as Judge Aldrich
- Bren Foster as Howard
- Vivica A. Fox as Dean Vera Rutledge
- Kyle Gass as Willoughby Flagler
- Carrie Genzel as Dr. Marlowe
- Diana Gettinger as Laurie
- Paul Green as Marvin Widmark
- Anne Lee Greene as Kendra Banks
- Ian Gregory as Charles McKendrick
- Nikki Griffin as Nicole Ryan
- Dean Haglund as Kip
- Ashley Hamilton as Devlin Grant
- Steve Richard Harris as Lex
- Jules Hartley as Molly Trevor
- Reggie Hayes as Kevin Freeman
- Erin Marie Hogan as Emily
- Neil Hopkins as Charles Solomon
- Stacy Stas Hurst as Jessica
- Adam Huss as Max Bailey
- Heidi James as Big Aggie
- Preston Jones as Aaron
- Tom Kirlin as Guard
- Kerry Knuppe as Daphne
- Joe Kraemer as Officer Taylor
- Steve Kriozere as Doctor
- Robert LaSardo as Laz Swan
- William Gregory Lee as Jimmy
- Kimo Leopoldo as Bodyguard
- Christian Levantino as Pete Greene
- Crystle Lightning as Candela
- Vedette Lim as Agent Pam
- Scott Logan as Jake Rutledge
- Sierra Love as Isabelle Cregar
- Kate Luyben as Mary Mason
- Jes Macallan as Susan Voight
- Stephen Macht as Leland Ryan
- Jordan Madley as Rachel Worth
- Janelle Marra as Gloria
- Michael Masini as Chris Gunden
- Brady Matthews as Chris Wade
- Paul Mazursky as Warden Jeffries
- Sandra McCoy as Professor Kelsey Williams
- Geoff Meed as O'Brien
- Cristin Michele as Cynthia
- Mirtha Michelle as Lauren Coleston
- Anya Monzikova as Darla McKendrick
- Nikki Moore as Abigail Strauss
- Chris Mulkey as Bendix Darby
- Isaiah Mustafa as Raven
- Jo Newman as Jess Russell
- Ashley Noel as Matilda West / Dark Matilda West
- Charlie O'Connell as Jay Roma
- Ho-Sung Pak as Superstar Assassin (aka The Ghost) / Fight Trainer
- Melissa Paulo as Erida
- Moniqua Plante as Sara
- Robert Picardo as Hieronymus Hawks
- Will Poston as Rafe Daniels
- Shani Pride as Tatiana
- Nick Principe as Killer
- Tara Radcliffe as Joanne Terranova
- Paul Rae as Guard
- Steve Railsback as Dr. Daniel Duryea
- Geoff Reeves as Steve Mason
- Arloa Reston as Sharon
- Makinna Ridgway as Angelica
- Jennifer Roa as Norma Swanson
- Eric Roberts as David Bannion
- Tobi Rodriguez as Lucky Starr
- Annie Ruby as Susan
- Betsy Rue as Libra
- Joel Rush as Pecs
- Joe Sabatino as Iggy Bacardi
- Antonio Sabàto Jr. as Bart
- Leilani Sarelle as Veronica Flood
- Bryan Sato as Kentaro
- Donna W. Scott as Alicia Ryan
- Angus Scrimm as Dr. Chandler
- Scheana Shay as Angel Tomlin
- Justin Shilton as Robinson McGraw
- Mark Simich as Davis Bennett
- Aiden Simko as Chaz
- Joe Slaughter as Roger Reynolds
- Melissa Soso as Girl coming out of the elevator
- Hollie Stenson as Abby
- Robin Sydney as Lindsey
- Colin Tary as Andy
- Jennifer Thompson as Ace's New Girl
- Diana Elizabeth Torres as Lydia Gonzales / El Jefe
- Elena Tovar as Elena Machado
- Tyson Turrou as Doug
- Tiffany Tynes as Tina Hendricks
- Ilia Volok as Dimitri Uzi Olesky
- Jasmine Waltz as Tara
- Heidi Marie Wanser as Max's Girlfriend
- Christopher Warner as Detective Brody
- Drew Waters as Robert Burke
- Charlie Weber as Ace
- Kit Willesee as Lacey Rivers
- Jason Wishnov as Man on Couch

== Episodes ==
=== Season 1 (2011) ===
No. overall	No. in season	Title	Directed by	Written by	Original release date
1 2	1 2	"Behind Locked Doors"	Greg Pritikin	Rick Copp	May 13, 2011
Movie star Lacey Rivers is in for the role of a lifetime after her fast-living lands her in jail. She finds that it's not so easy to make friends except for her tough cellmate, a starstruck guard and a sympathetic warden. Will her past finally catch up with her, or does she have nine lives?
3	3	"Bad Medicine"	Darin Scott	Steve Kriozere	May 20, 2011
Nurse Violet MacReady must cope with more than just a bad boyfriend on the overnight shift when an injured psychopath takes over the hospital.
4	4	"Something Like Murder"	Mark A. Altman	Shelby Carpenter	May 27, 2011
Bored trophy wife Darla has plans for her wealthy dull older husband after she meets a lovely masseuse, but does her new partner have plans for her?
5	5	"Speed Date"	Darin Scott	Buckaroo Zang, Reginald C. Hayes & Stephen Hatch	June 3, 2011
Video game designer Kevin Freeman decides to try online dating, but gets more than he bargained for when he finds out that his date Alexis also lied on her dating profile.
6	6	"The White Flower"	Michael Hurst	Michael Hurst	June 10, 2011
Two bank robbers are seduced into confronting their worst fears.
7	7	"Girls Gone Dead"	Greg Pritikin	Greg Pritikin	June 17, 2011
This episode follows a group of hot and bothered sorority girls who, in a seemingly desperate bid for some fast cash, agree to star in a raunchy home video series for infamous entrepreneurs Jay Roma and Kip. But the girls may have darker motives!
8	8	"Haunted"	Darin Scott	Turok Andar	June 24, 2011
Paranormal investigators team up with a beautiful demonologist to debunk a house's haunted reputation. Lex, Susan and R.J. set up a seance with noted expert Holly, but in a house that may contain a portal to hell, the supernatural fun takes a terrifying turn for the worse.
9	9	"Angel & Demons"	Michael Hurst	Michael Hurst	July 1, 2011
With a city on edge, thanks to a serial killer, two detectives race to stop him before he slays his newest victim. But "victim" may not be the best description for Angelica, a stunning club employee with a dark side of her own.
10	10	"Help Me, Rhonda"	Robert Meyer Burnett	Jackson Roykirk	July 8, 2011
Three thugs invade the home of a young woman, unaware that her lady lover is hiding inside. The criminals want Camille Gardner's husband, but what they get instead is a deadly surprise at the hands of Camille and her feisty girlfriend Rhonda in this twist-filled tale.
11	11	"The Clinic"	Michael Hurst	Michael Hurst	July 15, 2011
A man with a terminal illness checks into a mysterious Mexican clinic in the hopes of finding a miracle cure. But Logan Cale discovers that there are greater things to fear than his diagnosis as patients begin to disappear and a devious conspiracy takes shape.
12	12	"Till Death Do Us Part"	Robert Meyer Burnett	Rick Copp	July 22, 2011
It's the wedding bell blues for a young woman who wakes up on the morning after her bachelorette party with a dead stripper in her bed. Rachel Worth is getting married in just a few hours, but first she must try and piece together the hazy memories of the night before to find out who committed the ghastly murder.
13	13	"Visions, Part 1"	Mark A. Altman	Stanton Carlisle	July 29, 2011
A phony mentalist murders his greedy assistant and hires a new assistant – a con woman named Jessica. Foster Prentiss is a skillful performer who has never had any true psychic ability until he touches two lovely femme fatales... and witnesses their murderous acts.
14	14	"Visions, Part 2"	Mark A. Altman	Stanton Carlisle	August 5, 2011
Phony mentalist Foster Prentiss uses his newfound psychic skills and the help of his deceitful assistant Jessica to blackmail two lovely femme fatales. But when Lilith appears and reveals Foster's own dark background, the women team up to provide him with some painful payback.

=== Season 2 (2012) ===
No. overall	No. in season	Title	Directed by	Written by	Original release date
15	1	"16 Minutes of Fame"	Robert Meyer Burnett	Rick Copp	May 25, 2012
Big Brother meets Ten Little Indians in a reality show house in which the iconic contestants are being rapidly eliminated from the game... literally.
16	2	"Gun Twisted"	Darin Scott	Darin Scott	June 1, 2012
Marksman Bart Dall meets novice shooter Laurie Cummings at the pistol range. After a seductive lesson on shooting, Bart takes her to his place, where he shows her his extensive gun collection and tells her about his criminal past: he served four years for armed robbery. Laurie is shocked but turned on by Bart's story which leads to a very passionate night. Later, Laurie tearfully reveals to Bart that she was recently fired from her job as a bank teller after jealous Assistant Manager, Sara, set her up. Bart suggests that they use her inside information to pull off a heist. He cases the bank and plans the robbery in meticulous detail. But even the best plans can go awry.
17	3	"Trophy Wife"	Buddy Giovinazzo	Ron Cosentino	June 8, 2012
A husband and wife plot to kill each other, he with help from his mistress, she with assistance from an ex-cop.
18	4	"Extracurricular Activities"	Robert Meyer Burnett	Rick Copp	June 15, 2012
A lovely professor tries to draw a love-struck student into a murder plot.
19	5	"Killer Instinct"	Darin Scott	Darin Scott	June 22, 2012
Entrepreneur Davis Bennett attends a gallery opening where he strikes up a conversation with the mysterious, alluring Lauren Coleston. Their mutual passion for the arts leads to a tryst at Bennett's palatial apartment, followed by his murder – Lauren is an assassin and Davis Bennett was her first assignment. As she leaves, she is confronted by six masked men and taken captive. She wakes, bound to a chair, in a darkened interrogation room. A masked man demands to know who trained her and sent her to kill Bennett, and why. Will she crack or turn the tables on her captors?
20	6	"Bad Science"	Darin Scott	Christine Donlon, Turok Andar & Jackson Roykirk	June 29, 2012
Matilda West, a beautiful and brilliant scientist, materializes naked in a parallel dimension and is confronted by a woman with her face – her doppelganger, hardened soldier, Dark Matilda. When the two women touch, they vanish and are transported back to Matilda's lab. Driven by her desire to advance the science of teleportation, Matilda has caused friction amongst her colleagues and strained her marriage. Her strange journey – and the appearance of Dark Matilda – is proof of her success. But life and relationships were different in Dark Matilda's post-apocalyptic world and she begins to connect with her parallel counterparts. When both Matildas get ill – verification of a theory that life from different dimensions cannot co-exist – it becomes clear that one must return...
21 22	7 8	"Family Business"	Mark A. Altman	Sonny Steelgrave	July 6, 2012
A cop enlists the help of her ex to stop a Mafia princess who is trying to take over her father's business and is planning to kill a candidate for district attorney.
23	9	"Jail Break"	Steven Kriozere	Rick Copp	July 13, 2012
Two female convicts engineer a jailbreak by seducing a guard.
24	10	"Crazy Mary"	Darin Scott	Turok Andar	July 20, 2012
After her husband is murdered, a woman is wrongfully remanded to an institution for the criminally insane, where she is stalked by the real killer.
25	11	"One Man's Death"	Michael Hurst	Michael Hurst	July 27, 2012
After the mysterious death of an ADA, his widow and mistress form an unlikely partnership to investigate whether foul play was involved.
26	12	"Hell Hath No Furies"	Darin Scott	Darin Scott	August 3, 2012
The mistress of a sadistic criminal kingpin is targeted by his lusty three-woman hit squad while in custody on Christmas Eve.
27 28	13 14	"Libra"	Robert Meyer Burnett	Teleplay by : Buckaroo Zang; Story by : Bob Layton	August 10, 2012
A wrongfully committed woman escapes from an asylum, assumes the identity of a comic-book superhero named Libra, and sets out to get revenge on the family member that betrayed her.

== Home media ==
Entertainment One released Femme Fatales: The Complete 1st Season in a 3-disc DVD set on January 29, 2013. The set's featurettes also included footage from Season 2, which in turn was released in a 3-disc DVD set on July 16, 2013.

== Soundtrack ==
A soundtrack album for the series, with music composed and conducted by Joe Kraemer, was released on May 29, 2012, by MovieScore Media.
