= Nice Guys Sleep Alone =

- Directed by: Stu Pollard
- Written by: Stu Pollard; Bruce Feirstein (book)
- Produced by: Stu Pollard; Heidi Winston; Diana E. Williams
- Starring: Sean O'Bryan; Sybil Temtchine; Vanessa Marcil; Michael Greene; Brenda James; William Sanderson; Susannah Cranage; Blake Steury
- Cinematography: Nathan Hope
- Release date: 1999
- Running time: 92 minutes
- Country: United States
- Language: English

Nice Guys Sleep Alone is a 1999 romantic comedy film written and directed by Stu Pollard. The film is based on a book of the same title, written by Bruce Feirstein.

== Synopsis ==
A young man in Louisville sees his dating failures are related to his always being nice. All of his dates end up going with the rude, obnoxious guys. Deciding to change his way, he goes after a new acquaintance, who unfortunately is tired of the male boors she meets and is seeking Mr. Right – the rose-bearing guy who wants to be nice to her.

== Cast ==
- Sean O'Bryan as Carter
- Sybil Temtchine as Maggie
- Vanessa Marcil as Erin
- Michael Greene as Slick Willie
- Brenda James as Kate
- William Sanderson as Rufus
- Susannah Cranage as Nancy
- Blake Steury as Pat
- Derek McGrath as Eddie

== Release ==
The film's festival debut came at the Gothenburg Film Festival to a sold-out crowd. In the United States, Nice Guys Sleep Alone was screened at multiple film festivals and locations in the Midwest.

According to a 2012 article in The New Republic, the film became the first Netflix exclusive, when filmmaker Stu Pollard sold the company hundreds of unsold copies of the DVD.
