= Larry Pierce (singer) =

American musician (1950–2018)

- Born: 18 July 1950; Indianapolis, Indiana, United States
- Died: 19 November 2018 (aged 68)
- Genres: Comedy, country
- Occupation(s): Singer, comedian
- Instrument: Guitar
- Years active: 1991–2018
- Labels: Hyena, Hat Light, Busted
- Website: www.larrypierce.com

Larry G. Pierce (July 18, 1950 – November 19, 2018) was an American comedic-country music singer.

== Early life ==
Pierce lived most of his life in the small central Indiana town of Middletown. Pierce spent most of his life working in an auto parts factory, then after 30 years was forced into retirement due to the closing of the plant. Pierce decided to write his first dirty song as kind of a joke, the song was titled "Love Letters", leading to more songs with dirty lyrics.

== Career ==
In 1993, someone (unknown to Pierce) submitted some of his songs to Laughing Hyena Records, a label that specializes in truck stop comedy, mainly distributed at truck stops across the United States. Shortly after the submission of the demo tape, Pierce began recording for Laughing Hyena Records, churning out 13 albums in 10 years. Each and every album packed with Pierce's unique style of dirty country music. During this time, unbeknown to him, Pierce developed a respectable size fan base across the United States, all without touring or any radio air play.

In 2003, he was approached by an independent film company from New York City (Milkhouse Productions) to do a full-length documentary on his life and career as a dirty country singer "Dirty Country Movie The Larry Pierce Story". As if this news was not exciting enough, in 2005 a raunchy touring rock band from Colorado Springs (itis) asked Pierce to do a live show with them in Minneapolis. Following the success of Pierce's first live show, outside of his hometown, Pierce and (itis) traveled the United States performing Pierce's brand of raunchy country music to sometimes stunned audiences. Taking a break from touring, Pierce recorded his fourteenth studio album called Pussywhipped. Pussywhipped was the first album to be released on Pierce's new label Hat Light Recordings and featuring his new-found band (itis). While recording Pussywhipped, Pierce received a call from The Howard Stern Show, he was then informed that his song "Good Hard Fuckin" was one of Howard Stern's favorite songs.

On January 9, 2007, Pierce made his first appearance on The Howard Stern Show and announced the release of Pussywhipped on the show. Since then, Pierce has become something of a regular on the show, including phone-ins and live appearances, while his music is often played coming in and out of radio breaks. Pierce continued to live up to his moniker as "The Master of Dirty Country Music", by continuing to record and sing his unique brand of dirty country music.

== Live performance ==
Usually accompanied by his band, Pierce's live performances exemplified his unique brand of dirty country music. Often comical antics by band members and the use of props complete the set. Pierce also performed acoustic solo shows, armed with just his acoustic guitar branded “Pussy” and his signature hat.

== Discography ==
=== Albums ===
Year	Album
1991	Porno Country Party
1993	Locker Room Songs
1993	Hard Hat Hits
1994	Songs For Studs
1994	Nasty Country Songs
1995	Fertility Songs
1995	Tank Top Tunes
1995	Bedroom Songs
1995	Party Tunes
1996	Macho Melodies
1996	Horny Hits
1997	Dirty Old Man
2003	I Want to Be a Pimp
2004	Best of Larry Pierce
2007	Pussywhipped
2008	Unplugged – Live in Manhattan
2008	Hard Hat Hits/Macho Melodies/Fertility Songs – Reissue
2008	Locker Room Songs/Tank Top Tunes – Reissue
2008	Party Tunes/Bedroom Songs - Reissue
2009	Sick Minded Bastard

== Sources ==
- Rayner, Ben (Nov 9, 2008). "Being Dirty is Good Clean Fun". Toronto Star. Toronto, Ontario, Canada. pp. E.5. Archived from the original on January 31, 2013.
- Herron, Mat (December 10, 2008). "Country's Ambassador of Filth; Ra Ra Ra". LEOWEEKLY. Louisville, KY.
- Drew, Cooper (Jan 18, 2007). "Local Man Known As The Master of Dirty Country Music". The Middletown News. Middletown.
