= Sebastian Solberg =

British filmmaker born 1991

- Born: 9 June 1989 (age 37); Eastbourne, UK
- Occupation: Documentary Filmmaker
- Years active: 2010–present

Sebastian Solberg (born 27 March 1991) is a filmmaker and commercials director with ties to New Zealand and England. He first started making films aged 9 when he was inspired by the Bond movies.

== Early life ==
Solberg was born in Eastbourne, East Sussex, England. His father is Norwegian and his mother is English. At the age of two his parents moved to New Zealand where he developed his love for the outdoors.

Solberg graduated from Saint Kentigern College in 2009 where he was a head prefect and had lead roles in a number of school productions.

He first began making films when he was inspired by the adventures of James Bond and Alex Rider. Solberg won his first film-making award aged fourteen.

While at college Solberg made a film based on the children's story The Steadfast Tin Soldier written by the Scandinavian author Hans Christian Andersen. The film won multiple awards at festivals around New Zealand including 'Best Short Film' and 'Best Director'.

== Career ==
After graduating Solberg was hired to film branded content around New Zealand for companies such as Red Bull, Nissan, Hyundai and Billabong.

In 2010 he moved to England to work on international feature films and commercials. He began collaborating with writer / director Amit Gupta on a number of feature films including "One Crazy Thing" which Solberg second unit directed.

Solberg has directed commercials for a wide range of brands such as Visa, Mr Kipling, Weight Watchers, Premier Inn and Anchor.

He has directed a number of award winning short films including Modern Man which has screened in over 100 cities around the world and won a number of awards including ‘Best Comedy Short’.

In March 2015, Solberg travelled to outer Mongolia to work as second unit director on the documentary The Eagle Huntress. The film premiered at the Sundance Film Festival in January 2016 and is being executive produced by Daisy Ridley and Morgan Spurlock.

As well as film-making Solberg has a passion for education and empowering others to pursue their goals. He does this through public speaking and his blog where he regularly posts behind the scenes photos and stories from his latest film-making adventures.

== Filmography ==
Year	Title	Role
2008	The Steadfast Tin Soldier (short)	Director / Writer / Producer / Cinematographer / Editor
2011	Who's Watching Who (short)	Director / Cinematographer / Producer
2013	Modern Man (short)	Director / Producer
2014	50 Kisses (segment "Colton's Big Night")	Director / Producer
2016	One Crazy Thing	Second Unit Director
2016	The Eagle Huntress	Second Unit Director
