= Bees Make Honey (film) =

- Directed by: Jack Eve
- Screenplay by: Jack Eve
- Produced by: Jack Eve; Andrew Riach
- Starring: Alice Eve; Hermione Corfield; Joshua McGuire; Joséphine de La Baume; Anatole Taubman; Trevor Eve
- Cinematography: Richard Stoddard
- Edited by: Adam Gough
- Music by: Ryan Beveridge
- Production companies: Kew Media Group; Xploseve; Flexibon Films
- Release date: 29 September 2017 (Raindance Film Festival)
- Running time: 90 minutes
- Country: United Kingdom
- Language: English

Bees Make Honey is a 2017 dark comedy-drama-mystery film directed by Alice Eve's brother, Jack Eve. The film stars Alice Eve, Hermione Corfield, Joshua McGuire, Joséphine de La Baume, Anatole Taubman, and Trevor Eve. The film premiered at the 2017 Raindance Film Festival.

== Cast ==
- Alice Eve as Honey
- Hermione Corfield as Tatiana
- Joshua McGuire as Mr. Conick
- Joséphine de La Baume as Bijoux
- Anatole Taubman as Mr. Werner
- Ivanno Jeremiah as Russell
- Wilf Scolding as Inspector Shoerope
- Trevor Eve as Commissioner

== Release ==
The film premiered at the Raindance Film Festival on 23 September 2017. Content Media secured distribution rights to the film on the same day.
