= Sean O'Bryan =

American actor

- Born: Sean Michael O'Bryan; September 10, 1963 (age 63); Louisville, Kentucky, U.S.
- Occupation: Actor
- Years active: 1991–present
- Spouse: Samantha Follows (m. 1995)
- Children: 2
- Relatives: Megan Follows (sister-in-law); Ted Follows (father-in-law); Dawn Greenhalgh (mother-in-law)

Sean Michael O'Bryan (born September 10, 1963) is an American film and television actor from Louisville, Kentucky. He attended and graduated from St. Xavier High School.

== Career ==
He co-starred with William Ragsdale on the series Brother's Keeper. Early television work includes guest roles on such television series as Married... with Children, MacGyver, Northern Exposure, Cold Case, Diagnosis: Murder, Quantum Leap, Murder, She Wrote, Chicago Hope, Roswell (season 3 episode 9), Roseanne (season 8 episode 19), Six Feet Under, Criminal Minds, The King of Queens and Dexter. More recent television credits include CSI, Bones, Melissa & Joey, Hot In Cleveland, The Mentalist, Leverage. He appears in the recurring role of Ron Donahue on The Middle.

His film credits include Chaplin, Crimson Tide, Phenomenon, Exit to Eden, Out to Sea, Big Fat Liar, Detective, Deck the Halls, I'll Be Home for Christmas, Yes Man, Vantage Point and both Princess Diaries films. His more recent films include Playing for Keeps, Olympus Has Fallen, London Has Fallen and Mother's Day.

== Personal life ==
O'Bryan moved to Los Angeles in the early 1990s, where he lives with his wife, actress Samantha Follows (sister of Canadian actress Megan Follows). They married in 1995 and have two daughters. His daughter Rowan has cystic fibrosis and is an advocate for the disease.

== Filmography ==
=== Films ===
Film
Year	Title	Role	Notes
1991	Frankie and Johnny	Bobby	
1992	Chaplin	Lewis Seeley	
1993	Heart and Souls	John McBride	
1994	Exit to Eden	Tommy	
1994	Trapped in Paradise	Dick Anderson	
1995	Crimson Tide	Phone Talker	
1996	Phenomenon	Banes	
1997	The Twilight of the Golds	Steven	
1998	I'll Be Home for Christmas	Max	
1999	Nice Guys Sleep Alone	Carter	
2000	9mm of Love	Michael	Short film
2001	The Princess Diaries	Patrick O'Connell	
2002	Big Fat Liar	Leo	
2004	The Princess Diaries 2: Royal Engagement	Patrick O'Connell	
2005	Tom's Nu Heaven	Father Bill Mitchell	Co-producer
2005	Automatic	Brad Miller	Co-producer
2006	Mission: Impossible III	Party Goer	
2006	Deck the Halls	Mayor Young	
2008	Vantage Point	Cavic	
2008	Player 5150	Jerry	
2008	The Dark Horse	Purse Snatcher	Short film
2008	Kink	Guy Lysander	Short film Co-producer
2008	The Coverup	Jack Booker	Also known as The Thacker Case
2008	Yes Man	Ted	
2011	JumpRopeSprint	Eddie Ruggle	
2011	New Year's Eve	Pastor Edwin	Segment: "Ahern Party"
2012	Playing for Keeps	Assistant coach Jacob	
2012	Heaven	Clerk	Short film
2013	Olympus Has Fallen	Ray Monroe	
2014	Puncture Wounds	Detective Farragut	Also known as A Certain Justice
2014	Ice Cream Wallah	Sean	Short film
2014	Irreconcilable	Tommy	Short film
2014	Dawn Patrol	Mace	
2016	London Has Fallen	NSA Ray Monroe	
2016	The Making of "London Has Fallen"	Himself	Documentary / NSA Ray Monroe
2016	Get a Job	Alan Fredricks	
2016	Mother's Day	Male Cop	
2016	Don't Tell Kim	Eddie Ruggle	
2016	Smoke Filled Lungs	Ted	
2016	Squeal	Williams	Short film
2016	Boulevard of Unspoken Dreams	Tourist	Short film
2017	Beatriz at Dinner	Security Guard	
2017	First Night	Hitman	Short film
2017	The Fix	Vince	
2018	Golden Boy	Johnny	
	Rust Creek	Sheriff O'Doyle	
2019	Vaseline	Dr. Larry	Short film
2019	The Derailers	Merlin	Short film
2020	Jumping the Gun	Eddie Ruggle	
2020	The Stand at Paxton County	Vin Scurlock	
2021	Boy Makes Girl	Paulie	
2023	Missing	Radio Host	
2024	Traumatika	John Reed	

=== Television ===
Television
Year	Title	Role	Notes
1991	MacGyver	Willie	Season 7 episode 2: "The 'Hood"
1991	Sibs	Luke	Episode 5: "The Gift"
1992	Quantum Leap	Phillip Ashcroft	Season 4 episode 12: "Running for Honor - June 11, 1964"
1992	Northern Exposure	Kenny	Season 3 episode 18: "My Mother, My Sister"
1992–1995	Murder, She Wrote	Steve Burke / Paul Hampton / Charlie D. McCumber	3 episodes
1993	Marked for Murder		TV movie
1993	The Legend of Prince Valiant	Sir Geoffrey	Voice; Season 2 episode 23: "The Blackest Poison"
1993	Beverly Hills, 90210	Charlie Dixon	Season 4 episode 4: "Greek to Me"
1993	Married... with Children	Neuter	Season 8 episode 6: "No Chicken, No Check"
1993	Picket Fences	Larry	Season 2 episode 2: "Duty Free Rome"
1995	Pig Sty	Joe "Iowa" Dantley	Main role; 13 episodes
1995	Here Come the Munsters	Detective Cartwell	
1996	Roseanne	Doug	Season 8 episode 19: "Springtime for David"
1996	The Pretender	Bradley DuMonte	Season 1 episode 5: "The Paper Clock"
1996	Mary & Tim		TV movie
1997	Dark Skies	Ray Loengard	Episode 11: "The Enemy Within"
1997	Touched by an Angel	Jake Monroe	Season 3 episode 21: "Have You Seen Me?"
1997	Chicago Hope	Flight Attendant Ken	Season 4 episode 8: "Winging It"
1997	Fame L.A.		Episode 9: "Who Do You Love?"
1997	Jenny	Ethan	Episode 8: "A Girl's Gotta Love a Wedding"
1998	Two Guys, a Girl and a Pizza Place	Ted	Season 1 episode 3: "Two Guys, a Girl and a Guy"
1998-1999	Brother's Keeper	Bobby Waide	Main role; 23 episodes
1998-1999	TGIF	Himself	5 episodes
1999	A Touch of Hope		TV movie
1999	Jack & Jill	Stan	Season 1 episode 8: "Men Will Be Boys"
2000	The King of Queens	Marc Shropshire	Season 2 episode 18: "The Shmenkmans"
2000	The Huntress	Chick Talman	Episode 8: "Partners"
2000	Family Law	Greg Philner	Season 2 episode 2: "One Mistake"
2000	Diagnosis: Murder	Dave Caine	Season 8 episode 2: "Blind Man's Bluff"
2001	Providence	Dr. Rick Rozelli	Season 3 episode 17: "Vulnerability"
2001	Becker	Randy	Season 4 episode 6: "Get Me Out of Here"
2001	Roswell	Warren Turner	Season 3 episode 9: "Samuel Rising"
2001	True Love		TV movie
2002	Grounded for Life	Paul Ferris	Season 2 episode 16: "Relax!"
2002	Felicity	Paul	Season 4 episode 14: "Raising Arizona"
2002	Julie Lydecker		TV movie
2003	JAG	Season 9 episode 4: "The One That Got Away"	
2003	Las Vegas	Bill	Season 1 episode 9: "Year of the Tiger"
2003	Abby	Roger Tomkins	Main role; 10 episodes
2004	A Place Called Home	Dave	TV movie
2004	The Drew Carey Show	Dean	Season 9 episode 17: "Straight Eye for the Queer Guy"
2004	Crossing Jordan	Jake Gerloff	Season 4 episode 2: "Out of Sight"
2004	Center of the Universe	Gary	Episode 2: "The Lake House"
2004	NCIS	David Shields	Season 2 episode 6: "Terminal Leave"
2005	Detective	Elroy Doil	TV movie
2005	Six Feet Under	Tom Wheeler	3 episodes
2006	In Justice	Clark Sanders	Episode 5: "Another Country"
2006	Without a Trace	Dr. Jeremy Burton	Season 5 episode 3: "911"
2007	Criminal Minds	Vincent Stiles	Season 2 episode 19: "Ashes and Dust"
2007	Private Practice	Dave Walker	Season 1 episode 2: "In Which Sam Receives an Unexpected Visitor..."
2007	Two Families		TV movie
2008	Cold Case	Steve Pratt '73	Season 6 episode 1: "Glory Days"
2008	Family Man	Dwayne	TV movie
2009	Hatching Pete	Leon Ivey	TV movie
2009	FlashForward	Father Seabury	Episode 4: "Black Swan"
2009	Lie to Me	Tom McHenry	Season 2 episode 4: "Honey"
2009	Ghost Whisperer	David Miller	Season 5 episode 9: "Lost in the Shadows"
2010	Persons Unknown	Bill Blackham	Main role; 13 episodes
2010	Dexter	Dan Mendell	2 episodes
2011	CSI: Crime Scene Investigation	Reverend Rebetti	Season 11 episode 14
2011	Cinema Verite	Johnny Hall	TV movie
2011	Bones	Mike Shenfield	Season 6 episode 21: "The Signs in the Silence"
2011	Melissa & Joey	Paul Reback	Season 1 episode 23: "Going the Distance?"
2011	Hot in Cleveland	Andy	Season 3 episode 5: "One Thing or a Mother"
2011–2018	The Middle	Ron Donahue	21 episodes
2012	Leverage	Kip Bryden	Season 5 episode 3: "The First Contact Job"
2012	Good Luck Charlie	Mr. Hammerstone	2 episodes
2013	Mary and Martha	Senator	TV movie
2014	The Mentalist	Emmett Fitzgerald	Season 6 episode 14: "Grey Water"
2014	Sweet Surrender	Steve	TV movie
2014	Glee	Roric	Season 5 episode 19: "Old Dog, New Tricks"
2014–2015	Scotch Moses	The Boss / The Robber	2 episodes
2015	Table 58	Coach Peterson	TV movie
2015	Whitney	Hotel Manager	TV movie
2015	Banish'd	King Norther	Episode: "Pilot"
2015	Workaholics	Dave	Season 5 episode 12: "Peyote It Forward"
2015	The House Sitter	Kyle Lawrence	TV movie
2016	Agent Carter	Detective Andrew Henry	Season 2 episode 1: "The Lady in the Lake"
2016	Murder in the First	Sam Rydell	3 episodes
2016	Adam Ruins Everything	Bruce	Season 1 episode 18: "Adam Ruins Immigration"
2017	Two Sentence Horror Stories	Jefferey	Season 1 episode 5: "Second Skin"
2018	NCIS: Los Angeles	Gavin Teed	Season 9 episode 12: "Under Pressure"
2018	Code Black	Dr. Edlen	Season 3 episode 12: "As Night Comes and I'm Breathing"
2018	Christmas Break-In	Pete Rush	TV movie
2018	Engaged to a Psycho	Chandler	TV movie
2018	Superstore	Ted	Season 4 episode 8: "Managers' Conference"
2018	Vows: A Life Sentence	Bernie	TV movie
2018	Borderline Talent	Bill	Miniseries
2019	The Unicorn	Jim	Season 1 episode 8: "Turkeys and Traditions"
2019	Dealbreakers	Bill	Season 1 episode 1: "Dealbreakers"
2019	Nice Iranian Girl	Jim	Episode: "Chapter 1"
2020	The Real Bros of Simi Valley	Jeff & Sandy's Friend	Season 3 episode 3: "Decaf Kush"
2020	Shameless	George	2 episodes
2021	9-1-1: Lone Star	Minefield Owner	Season 2 episode 6: "Everyone and Their Brother"
