= Hermione Corfield =

British actress (born 1993)

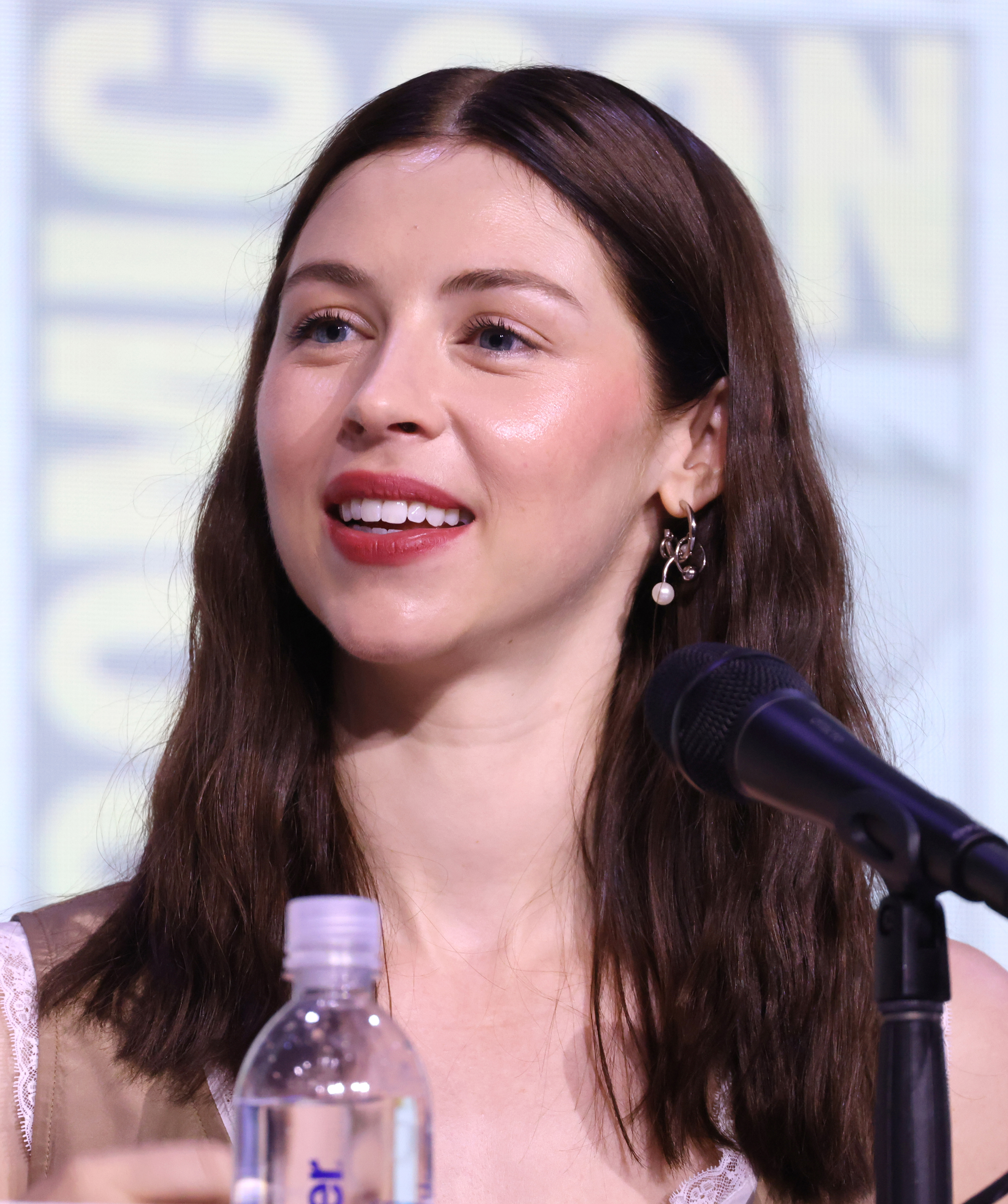
- Corfield in 2025
- Born: Hermione Isla Conyngham Corfield; 19 December 1993 (age 32); London, England
- Occupations: Actress; model
- Years active: 2014–present

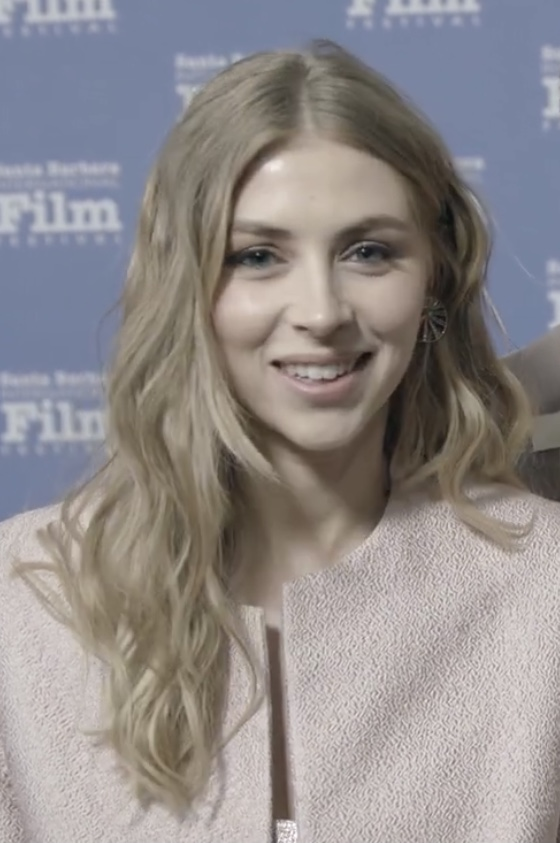
Corfield at the 2022 Santa Barbara International Film Festival

Hermione Isla Conyngham Corfield (born 19 December 1993) is a British actress. She starred in the films Rust Creek (2018), Sea Fever (2019), The Misfits (2021) and The Road Dance (2022). Her other films include Mission: Impossible – Rogue Nation (2015), XXX: Return of Xander Cage (2017) and Star Wars: The Last Jedi (2017).

On television, she is known for her roles in the ITV period drama The Halcyon (2017) and the Alibi series We Hunt Together (2020–2022).

== Early life ==
Hermione Isla Conyngham Corfield was born on 19 December 1993 in London, England, the daughter of Richard Conyngham Corfield, of the Corfield family of Chatwall Hall, Shropshire, and Jermyn Street shirt designer Emma Willis. She attended Downe House School in Cold Ash, a village near Newbury, Berkshire. Corfield studied English literature at University College London before taking a method acting course at the Lee Strasberg Theatre and Film Institute in New York.

== Career ==
Corfield made her film debut in 2014 with Colton's Big Night, a segment in the film 50 Kisses, directed by Sebastian Solberg, in which she plays a character named Anna. In 2015, she starred alongside Ian McKellen and Laura Linney in Mr. Holmes, and appeared in Mission: Impossible – Rogue Nation opposite Tom Cruise. She also worked with Penélope Cruz in an advertisement campaign for Schweppes. In 2014, she was cast in Fallen as Gabrielle Givens. In 2016, she appeared in Pride and Prejudice and Zombies as Cassandra. In 2017, she appeared in XXX: Return of Xander Cage alongside Vin Diesel, the Guy Ritchie-directed King Arthur: Legend of the Sword, and in Star Wars: The Last Jedi as Tallie Lintra, a Resistance A-Wing pilot and squadron leader. She also starred in the ITV drama The Halcyon as Emma Garland.

She starred in the 2017 film Bees Make Honey and in the 2018 British comedy film Slaughterhouse Rulez, along with Asa Butterfield, Finn Cole, Michael Sheen, Nick Frost, and Simon Pegg.

Corfield received acclaim from critics for her performance in Rust Creek, which was released in cinemas on 4 January 2019. She played one of the central characters in the 2020 TV series We Hunt Together.

In February 2024, it was announced that Corfield had been cast as Julia Moriston in the Outlander prequel series Outlander: Blood of My Blood.

== Filmography ==
=== Film ===
Year	Title	Role	Note	Ref.
2014	50 Kisses	Anna	Segment: "Colton's Big Night"	
2015	Mr. Holmes	Matinee 'Ann Kelmot'		
2015	Mission: Impossible – Rogue Nation	Record Shop Keeper / IMF agent		
2016	Pride and Prejudice and Zombies	Cassandra Featherstone		
2016	Fallen	Gabrielle "Gabbe" Givens		
2017	XXX: Return of Xander Cage	Ainsley		
2017	King Arthur: Legend of the Sword	Syren 3		
2017	Star Wars: The Last Jedi	Tallissan "Tallie" Lintra		
2018	Bees Make Honey	Tatiana		
2018	Slaughterhouse Rulez	Clemsie Lawrence		
2019	Rust Creek	Sawyer Scott		
2019	Born a King	Princess Mary		
2019	Sea Fever	Siobhán		
2021	The Misfits	Hope Pace		
2021	The Road Dance	Kirsty Macleod		
2023	A Million Days	Charlie		
2025	Fear Below	Clara Bennett		

=== Television ===
Year	Title	Role	Notes	Ref.
2016	Endeavour	Cassie Watkins	Episode: "Prey"	
2017	The Halcyon	Emma Garland	8 episodes	
2020–2022	We Hunt Together	Freddy Lane	Lead role	
2025	Outlander: Blood of My Blood	Julia Moriston	Main role	

=== Video games ===
Year	Title	Role	Ref.
2022	Lego Star Wars: The Skywalker Saga	Tallissan "Tallie" Lintra (voice)	

== Awards and nominations ==
Year	Award	Category	Work	Result	Ref.
2016	National Film Awards UK	Best Newcomer	Mission: Impossible – Rogue Nation	Nominated	
2018	Breckenridge Festival of Film	Best Actress	Rust Creek	Won	
2018	Jefferson State Flixx Fest	Best Actress	Rust Creek	Won	
