= The Night Lands =

- Game of Thrones episode
- Episode no.: Season 2 Episode 2
- Directed by: Alan Taylor
- Written by: David Benioff; D. B. Weiss
- Cinematography by: Kramer Morgenthau
- Editing by: Frances Parker
- Original air date: April 8, 2012
- Running time: 53 minutes

Guest appearances
- Julian Glover as Grand Maester Pycelle; Robert Pugh as Craster; Patrick Malahide as Balon Greyjoy; Francis Magee as Yoren; Dominic Carter as Janos Slynt; Tom Wlaschiha as Jaqen H'ghar; Joe Dempsie as Gendry; Mark Stanley as Grenn; Ben Crompton as Eddison Tollett; Roxanne McKee as Doreah; Amrita Acharia as Irri; Steven Cole as Kovarro (credit only); Ben Hawkey as Hot Pie; Eros Vlahos as Lommy Greenhands; Esmé Bianco as Ros; Andy Beckwith as Rorge; Gemma Whelan as Yara Greyjoy; Kerr Logan as Matthos Seaworth; Lucian Msamati as Salladhor Saan; Hannah Murray as Gilly; Karl Davies as Alton Lannister; Gerard Jordan as Biter; Daniel Portman as Podrick Payne; Ian Whyte as a White Walker

Episode chronology
← Previous "The North Remembers"	Next → "What Is Dead May Never Die"
- Game of Thrones season 2

"The Night Lands" is the second episode of the second season of HBO's medieval fantasy television series Game of Thrones, and the 12th overall. The episode was directed by Alan Taylor and written by series creators and executive producers David Benioff and D. B. Weiss. It first aired on April 8, 2012.

The episode's plot continues storylines from the season premiere: the Small Council receives peace terms proposed by Robb Stark, Yoren's caravan traveling to the Wall is interrupted by City Watch guards looking for Gendry, Daenerys Targaryen waits in the Red Waste for her three riders to return, Theon Greyjoy returns to his homeland of the Iron Islands, and the Night's Watch continues to camp at Craster's Keep. The episode achieved a viewership of 3.76 million during its initial broadcast in the United States.

"The Night Lands" received positive reviews from critics and viewers, who noted many pivotal character moments as highlights in the episode.

== Plot ==
=== At Dragonstone ===
Davos and his son Matthos recruit pirate Salladhor Saan and his fleet to join them in the war. Melisandre seduces Stannis, promising him a son if he gives himself to the Lord of Light.

=== In King's Landing ===
The Small Council ignores Robb's peace terms, as well as the request by the Night's Watch for more men and their report of encounters with the undead. When City Watch Commander Janos Slynt refuses to reveal who ordered the purge of Robert's bastard children, Tyrion exiles him to the Night's Watch, replacing him with Bronn. Cersei confronts Tyrion about exiling Slynt, causing Tyrion to realize that Joffrey ordered the purge without telling Cersei.

=== In the Red Waste ===
Rakharo's horse returns to Daenerys's camp carrying his severed head, leaving Irri devastated and explaining that his soul will never rest with the ancestors since they did not burn his body. Jorah explains it is a message from another khal refusing to accept a woman's rule over a khalasar, and Daenerys vows revenge.

=== On the Iron Islands ===
Returning to his homeland, Theon tries to seduce a young woman, Yara. At Pyke, Theon presents his father Balon with Robb's offer that will make Balon King of the Iron Islands. Balon refuses, wishing to take his crown with Yara, revealed to be Theon's sister, at the helm of his fleet. Theon realizes Balon's intention is to take the North for himself.

=== On the Kingsroad ===
City Watchmen search the caravan for Gendry but are turned away by Yoren. Gendry tells Arya that he knows she is a girl, and she reveals her name after learning that her father met Gendry before he was executed.

=== Beyond The Wall ===
Sam asks Jon about taking Gilly, one of Craster's daughter-wives, with them but Jon refuses. Gilly is pregnant, and Jon wonders what happens to Craster's sons. That night, Jon follows Craster taking a newborn child into the woods, and sees a White Walker retrieve the baby, but Craster knocks Jon unconscious.

== Production ==
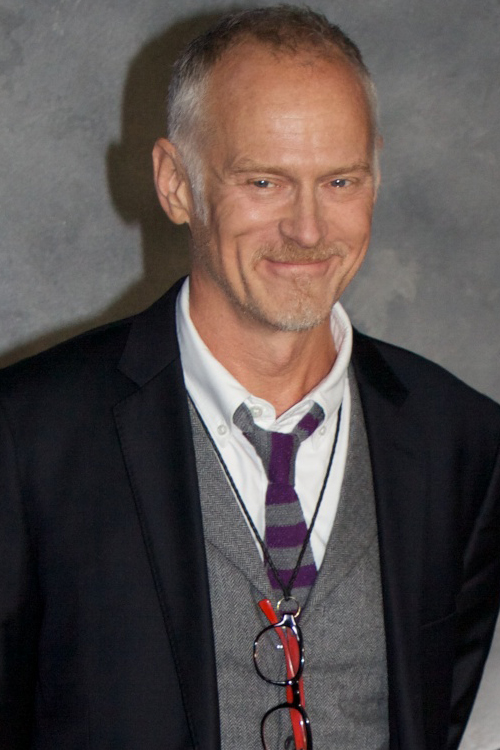
Alan Taylor directed "The Night Lands", his fourth directed episode in the series.

=== Writing ===
The episode was written by series creators and executive producers David Benioff and D. B. Weiss, adapted from original material from George R. R. Martin's A Clash of Kings. It includes most of the plot from chapters Arya II, Tyrion II, Arya III, Theon I, part of Daenerys I, Tyrion III, part of Arya V, part of Tyrion V, part of Jon III and part of Theon II (chapters 6, 8–12, 19–20, 23–25 respectively).

One of the main deviations from the books was the removal of the character of the new commander of the City Watch, Ser Jacelyn Bywater, his role merged with the already introduced Bronn. Another character that was excluded was Aeron Damphair, who was not present to welcome his nephew Theon at the Iron Islands. Instead, he was received by his sister, in a scene that took place much later in the books.

Also, some scenes that are only subtly implied in the original were made explicit in the episode. The scenes depicting Craster delivering a newborn son to the White Walkers and the sexual relationship between Stannis and Melisandre were written into the show by the producers.

The episode was directed by Alan Taylor, who previously directed "Baelor", "Fire and Blood", and "The North Remembers".

=== Casting ===
Theon Greyjoy's extended family is first seen in this episode. The role of his father Balon Greyjoy, Lord of the Iron Islands, went to the English actor Patrick Malahide. The character of his sister was renamed from the original books (from Asha to Yara) in order to avoid confusion with the already established character Osha (the wildling captive at Winterfell), and Gemma Whelan was chosen to play the role. After seeing Whelan and Alfie Allen (Theon Greyjoy) acting together, the show creators assured that they made "an insanely good pair of siblings". Lily Allen, an English singer-songwriter and Alfie Allen's sister, claimed that she had been offered the role of Yara Greyjoy but turned it down because the scenes might have been awkward to film. However, Alfie Allen denied that his sister was ever offered the role.

Also introduced in this episode are the three caged recruits, traveling with the Night's Watch caravan. The three characters were briefly seen in the last season's finale, played by uncredited extras. For this season they were, Andy Beckwith as Rorge, Gerard Jordan as Biter, and the German actor Tom Wlaschiha as the mysterious Jaqen H'ghar of the free city of Lorath. Wlaschiha had not known of the show before auditioning on tape from Berlin, but was able to screen a few episodes during a meeting with the producers and director Alan Taylor. He quickly became an enthusiast, reading the first books of the series within a couple of days.

Finally, the part of the Lyseni pirate Salladhor Saan went to Lucian Msamati. Msamati's physical appearance, a Black, British actor of Tanzanian descent, contrasts with Sallahdor's portrayal in the books, where he is described with the typical fair-haired and fair-skinned look of the free city of Lys.

=== Filming ===
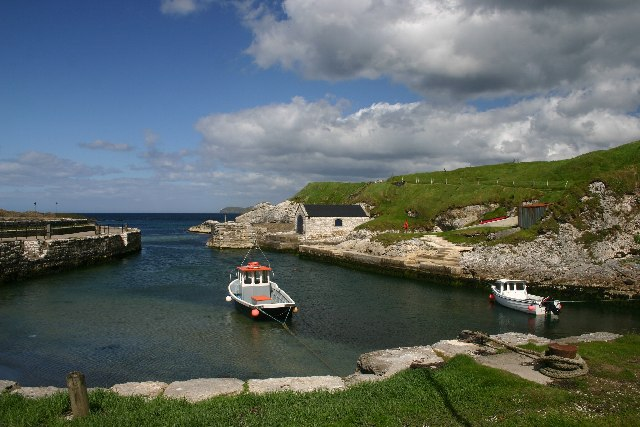
The harbor of Ballintoy was redressed as the port of Pyke.

The episode introduces the new location of Pyke, the Greyjoys' seat of power on the Iron Islands. Scenes set there were filmed at Lordsport Harbour, Ballintoy, in Northern Ireland's County of Antrim. The filming at the Harbour took place on August 18, 19 and 22, 2011, and from August 15 there was a limited public access to the zone. The local shops and fishermen, who had to temporarily berth their boats at the nearby town of Ballycastle, were compensated by the production.

Other locations in Northern Ireland were used once again, including the interiors in the Paint Hall studio in Belfast.

== Reception ==
=== Ratings ===
On the night of its premiere, the episode achieved a viewership of 3.76 million during its initial airing at 9:00pm and an additional 1.07 million viewers for the rerun at 11:00pm. Viewer shares among the 18–49 demographic was 1.9. It marked a slight decrease in viewership from the previous episode, "The North Remembers". James Hibberd of Entertainment Weekly wrote that: "Last week's premiere was a series-high number, and considering that TV series viewership typically drops post-premiere, retaining nearly all of the debut audience is a strong accomplishment." In the United Kingdom, the episode was seen by 0.851 million viewers on Sky Atlantic, making it the highest-rated broadcast that week.

It first premiered on April 2, 2012, via the online service HBO GO in some European countries, including the Netherlands, Poland and Slovenia. The day after the release of the rating of this second episode HBO announced the renewal of the show for a third season.

=== Critical reception ===
"The Night Lands" received positive reviews from critics. On the review aggregator website Rotten Tomatoes, 89% of 28 critics' reviews are positive, with an average rating of 8.2/10. The website's consensus reads: "Moodier than the premiere and full of dark intrigue, 'The Night Lands' introduces viewers to exotic new locations in Westeros and delivers some pivotal character moments."

For IGN, Matt Fowler gave the episode an 8 out of 10, calling it "a great place-holder episode" and "a satisfying follow-up to the premiere filled with less-than-monumental happenings". In a review targeted at those who have read the source novels, The A.V. Club's Emily St. James gave the episode an A−, remarking: "This is a strong and confident episode of the show, and it takes us easily enough from the Red Wastes to Beyond the Wall to Melisandre and Stannis having sex on a giant exposition table, seemingly without breaking a sweat." St. James commented positively on the episode's themes, which she believed were the definition of good leadership and the negative side of patriarchy. In a review targeted at those who haven't read the source novels, The A.V. Club's David Sims gave the episode a B+, writing that the episode was "a nastier, broodier episode than the table-setting of 'The North Remembers', and it doesn’t have quite the same epic feel, but things are moving along slowly but surely".

Less positively, WhatCulture's Patrick Koch placed "The Night Lands" last in his ranking of the first four seasons of Game of Thrones, calling the Greyjoy plotline on Pyke "supremely non-interesting". Writing for Slant Magazine, Simon Abrams gave the episode a mixed review compared to the premiere, referring to "The Night Lands" as "a bit of a let-down" and "not as thematically cogent as last week's episode". In his episode recap for Entertainment Weekly, James Hibberd noted that the amount of sex scenes in the first season was "probably the biggest point of debate among viewers" and observed that this episode "might have been the most sex-focused hour yet". The episode was cut short by the Dubai-based broadcaster Etisalat during its initial airing due to concerns about nudity. According to The National, previous episodes had been aired on Etisalat with "minimal editing".
