= Smoke Gets in Your Eyes (Mad Men) =

- Mad Men episode
- Episode no.: Season 1 Episode 1
- Directed by: Alan Taylor
- Written by: Matthew Weiner
- Cinematography by: Phil Abraham
- Original air date: July 19, 2007
- Running time: 49 minutes

Guest appearances
- Remy Auberjonois as Dr. Emerson; Darren Pettie as Lee Garner Jr.; Rosemarie DeWitt as Midge Daniels; John Slattery as Roger Sterling; John Cullum as Lee Garner Sr.; Bryan Batt as Salvatore Romano; Aaron Staton as Ken Cosgrove; Michael Gladis as Paul Kinsey; Rich Sommer as Harry Crane; Gordana Rashovich as Dr. Greta Guttman

Episode chronology
← Previous —	Next → "Ladies Room"
- Mad Men season 1

"Smoke Gets in Your Eyes" is the series premiere of the American period drama television series Mad Men. It first aired on July 19, 2007 in the United States on AMC and was written by creator Matthew Weiner and directed by Alan Taylor. "Smoke Gets in Your Eyes" was budgeted at US$3 million. Production for the episode took place in New York City and Los Angeles.

Weiner conceived of the script in 2000 while working as a writer for the television sitcom Becker. Before writing the pilot episode, he studied American literature and cinema of the 1950s and 1960s to get a perspective on American culture during that period. Weiner sent the script to The Sopranos creator David Chase, who recruited Weiner to work with him on The Sopranos. Weiner shelved the project for seven years to focus on Chase's program; interest for Mad Men did not surface until the conclusion of The Sopranos' final season.

According to the Nielsen Media Research, the episode attained a rating of 1.4 (1.2 million households) upon initial airing.

== Plot ==
In March 1960, Don Draper (Jon Hamm), creative director at Madison Avenue advertising agency Sterling Cooper, struggles to advertise cigarettes amid rising health concerns and laws prohibiting health claims in cigarette advertising. He seeks advice, including from his girlfriend Midge Daniels (Rosemarie DeWitt), but rejects research from Sterling Cooper suggesting people are driven to smoking by a collective "death wish".

Peggy Olson (Elisabeth Moss) begins a new job as Don's secretary, with office manager Joan Holloway (Christina Hendricks) advising her to use her sex appeal to men to get ahead. After junior account executive Pete Campbell (Vincent Kartheiser) sexually harasses her, Don reprimands him. Peggy later undergoes a vaginal exam arranged by Joan to obtain Enovid, which, at the time, was only prescribed to married women with their husband's consent.

Meanwhile, Don and his superior Roger Sterling (John Slattery) meet Rachel Menken (Maggie Siff) about her department store, but their pitch falls flat. Offended by their ideas and tactics, Rachel criticizes the agency's lack of innovation, prompting Don to leave. A meeting with Lucky Strike falters as Don struggles to pitch, and Pete suggests the "death wish" idea, which he found snooping through Don's garbage but the idea is rejected. As the clients prepare to leave, Don salvages the meeting with the slogan "It’s toasted!" Afterwards, he rebukes Pete, and later turns down Peggy’s flirtatious attempt to thank him, recognizing she felt obligated to respond to men in this manner.

Don meets Rachel for drinks to make amends for their meeting and challenges her naïve view of love: feeling a connection to Don, she agrees to give Sterling Cooper another chance. Pete, dejected after being rejected by a woman during his bachelor party, shows up drunk at Peggy's apartment; she lets him in. Later, Don returns home to his wife Betty Draper (January Jones) and checks in on their two children.

== Production ==
=== Conception ===
Creator Matthew Weiner conceived the script for "Smoke Gets in Your Eyes" in 2000, while he was working as a writer for the sitcom Becker. The first draft of the episode was written as a spec script and was titled "The Division". Two years later, Weiner sent the script to David Chase, the creator of The Sopranos, although Weiner's agents insisted that he not proceed with his plans. Chase later recruited him upon first glance. "It was what you're always hoping to see," he recalled. "It was lively and it had something new to say. Here was someone who had written a story about advertising in the 1960s, and was looking at recent American history through that prism." Weiner set the pilot script aside for the next seven years to focus on The Sopranos. Neither HBO nor Showtime expressed interest in the project until the commencement of The Sopranos' final season. During that time, AMC began looking into the television market for new programming. "The network was looking for distinction in launching its first original series," according to AMC Networks president Ed Carroll, "and we took a bet that quality would win out over formulaic mass appeal."

Prior to writing the pilot episode, Weiner studied American culture during the 1950s and 1960s, analyzing literary works such as The Feminine Mystique (1963) and Sex and the Single Girl (1962) while viewing such films as The Apartment (1960) and A Guide for the Married Man (1967). He continued his endeavors when the series' concept began to materialize, as he received a copy of Richard Yates' novel Revolutionary Road (1962) from the executives of AMC. Weiner discussed the look of Mad Men with production designer Bob Shaw and cinematographer Phil Abraham, who Weiner had previously collaborated with in The Sopranos. Abraham wanted to establish a more genuine approach to portraying society in the 1960s, rather than "simply referencing the period as seen in movies of that time. We wanted to be more genuine than that. Movies were an influence." In evoking historical accuracy of elements such as architecture and graphic design, Abraham sought inspiration from the buildings designed by the architecture firm Skidmore, Owings and Merrill. He said, "We noticed that in all the Skidmore, Owings & Merrill designs of contemporary buildings, the ceiling—the overhead grid of lights—was a strong graphic element in all the office spaces. In one design we loved, the whole ceiling was like a lightbox. It was a time of high modernism, and we embraced the notion of presenting the world in that way. These were new work spaces—sleek, not stuffy."

=== Casting ===
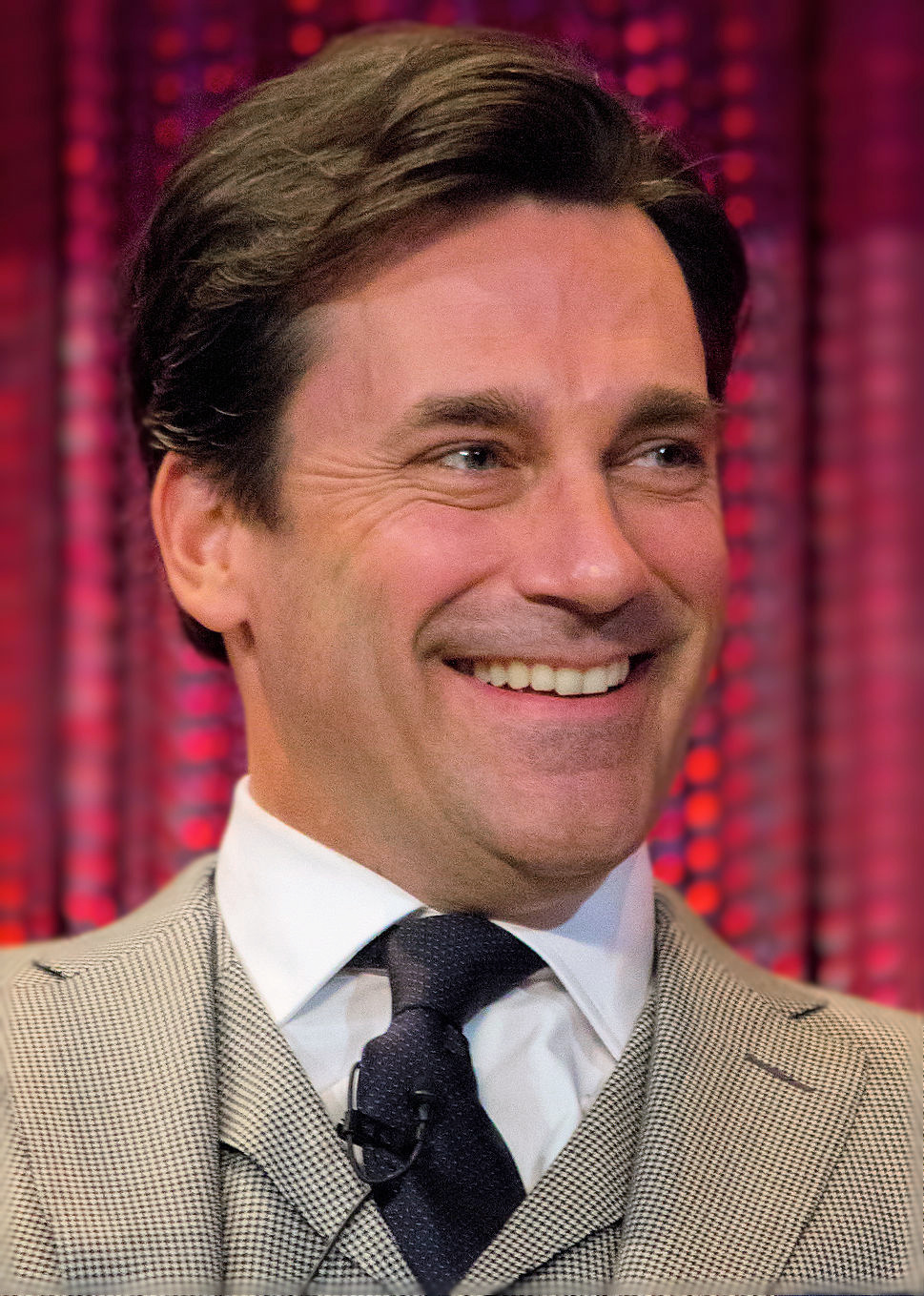
Hamm (pictured) was chosen to portray Don Draper, out of 80 other candidates.

Jon Hamm was cast as Don Draper, the central character of the series. Hamm, who was relatively unknown at the time, competed with 80 other actors in the auditioning process. Weiner proclaimed that Hamm accurately portrayed the character, saying that he was "the only person who really had this great mix of empathy and masculinity and intelligence. Both Don and Jon have an inner life. So long as you have that kind of depth in a human being, people will root for him [...] Jon walked out of the room and I said, 'That guy has lived.'" Hamm admitted that he felt that he had a considerable disadvantage compared to his peers and initially believed Thomas Jane would acquire the role. "I started, literally, on the very, very bottom," he iterated. "I couldn't have had less heat on me. Nobody knew who I was. The casting directors didn't know who I was. I wasn't on anybody's lists. The funny thing was, I think they went to Thomas Jane for it, and they were told that Thomas Jane does not do television." Hamm went through seven auditions; his last one took place at the Hotel Gansevoort in the Meatpacking District of New York City. "When we were riding down on the elevator, the woman in charge of whatever the decision-making process was told me, 'You got the job.'"

John Slattery, who was later cast as Roger Sterling, originally auditioned to portray Don Draper. Slattery felt Don was the show's biggest draw and was disappointed upon hearing of his character's sparse screen time. He recalled, "I really did prepare the thing and went in and I worked hard on it and then read for Don and they actually gave me adjustments and I went and I did it again. And then they sort of said, 'Well, look, here's the deal. We have a guy. The reason we asked you to come in and read for Draper is because we didn't think that you'd come in a read for Roger because there wasn't that much Roger in the script.'" During production of "Smoke Gets in Your Eyes," Slattery admitted he was unsure of whether to continue working on Mad Men. "I was on the fence a little bit, even while shooting it. And I think Matt finally was like, 'Look man, we're not jerking you around here. We're serious about this and I've really thought this out. I promise you this will be a great character and it will be a big part of the show.'"

Producers of Mad Men approached January Jones to portray Betty Draper, Don's wife and the mother of their two children. Jones avouched that portraying the character would give the audience an opportunity to see a dark side of her nature. She initially auditioned for the role of Peggy Olson, which was later given to fellow cast member Elisabeth Moss. "It got down between Elisabeth Moss and myself, and it was obviously more suited to her, but Matthew had said, you know, there's this other role, of the wife." Jones signed a seven-year contract with the show, although her character originally had two lines in "Smoke Gets in Your Eyes." Weiner eventually edited the script to accommodate her desires. "It's such a testament to his ability," Jones stated. "He just took something out of thin air, which makes me think now that he had to have had an idea that the wife was going to be part of the show, because I kind of took the job with the promise that Betty would be a part of the show. When you sign a seven-year contract, you want to make sure you're in the show." Christina Hendricks was brought in to play Joan Holloway, the office manager and head of Sterling Cooper's secretarial pool. While Hendricks had previously made recurring appearances on ER before being on Mad Men, her acting career had been largely inactive, and Hendricks' agent urged her not to participate in the project. "They said to me, 'AMC [...] doesn't have any other big shows—why would you do this instead of taking something that's a better bet?' I said, 'Look, I've gone with the one that's the better bet in the past—let's go with the really good script this time.'"

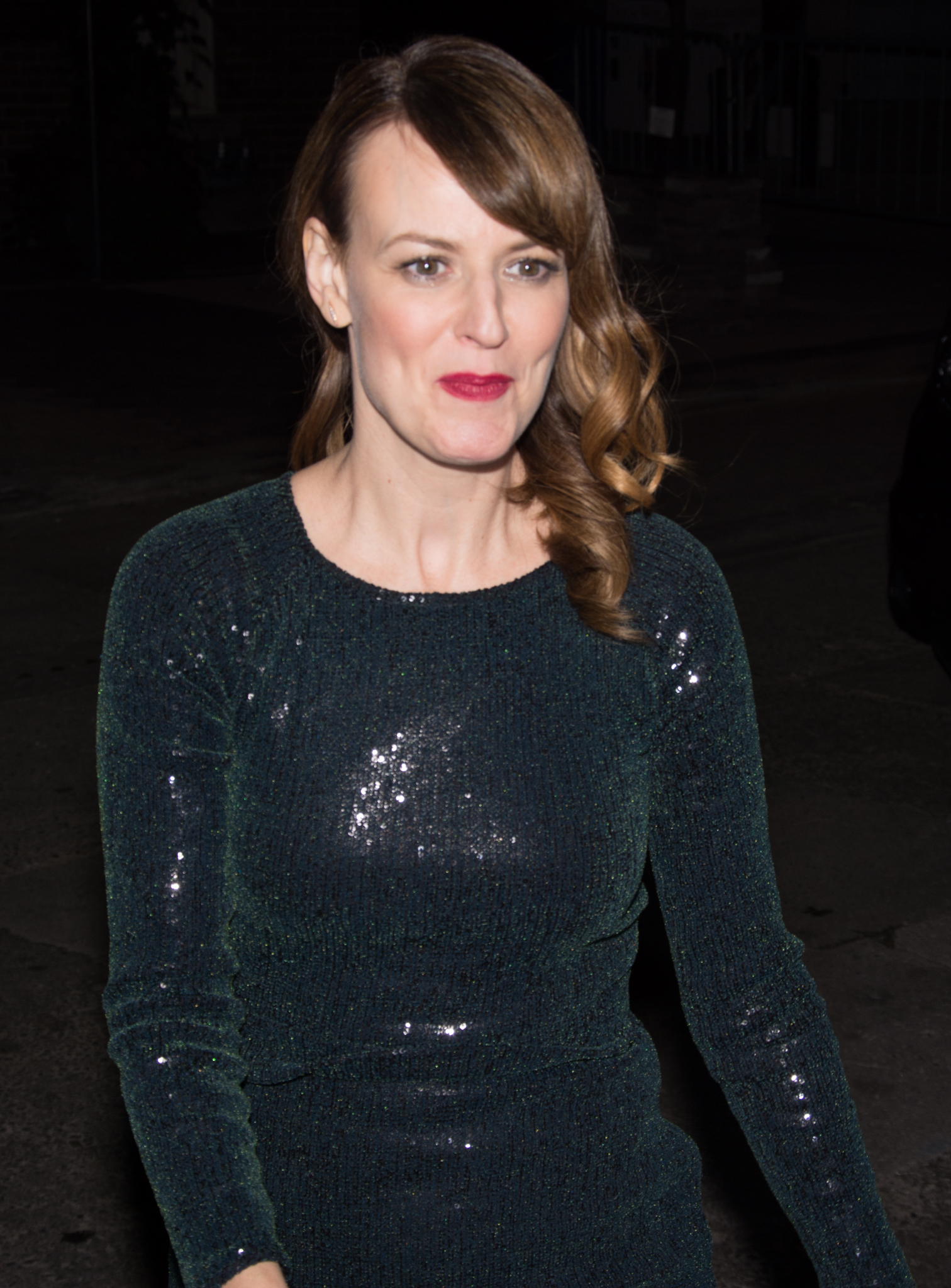
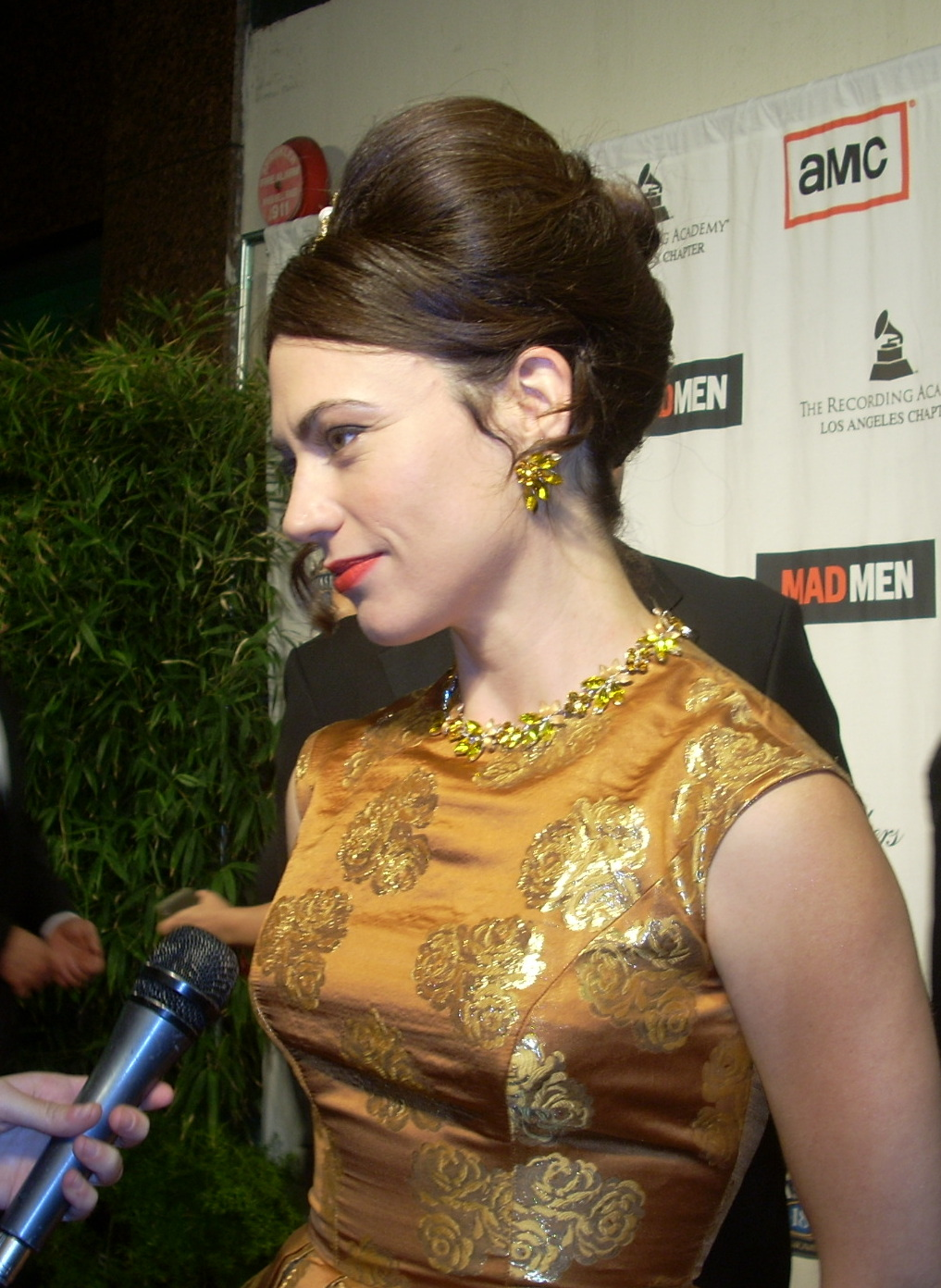
"Smoke Gets in Your Eyes" features guest appearances by Rosemarie DeWitt (left) and Maggie Siff (right).

"Smoke Gets in Your Eyes" features guest appearances from several actors and actresses, including Rosemarie DeWitt (as Midge) and Maggie Siff (as Rachel Menken). DeWitt was given a recurring role in the season as Don's mistress, which lasted for six episodes. She initially felt out of place while playing out her character. DeWitt stated, "They were at the end of casting, and hadn't found the right Midge yet. Originally they had a scene where she opens the door wearing a red kimono, and I remember thinking 'I'm not that', so I wasn't sure I was right for the part. Maybe the fact that I wasn't this 'vamp' is what made Matt Weiner give me a shot." Prior to working on Mad Men, Siff mainly worked in theatre and performing arts.

=== Filming ===
"Smoke Gets in Your Eyes" was budgeted at US$3 million, slightly more than the US$2–2.5 million budgeted in typical Mad Men episodes. The pilot episode began filming on April 20, 2006, and was mostly shot at various locations in and around New York City including the Silvercup Studios, where principal photography lasted for two days. Several scenes were also shot at a historic 130 West 57th Street art studio owned by artist Adam Van Doren that was previously occupied by Childe Hassam and Charles Baskerville. Most of the production crew were previously part of The Sopranos. After filming concluded in New York, production moved to the Los Angeles Center Studios. Abraham collaborated with an entirely different production crew from the one in New York. According to Abraham, Los Angeles contained a continuity that was related to the show. "Once we moved to L.A., there was a continuity of style that came from Alan and me, and that was important to Matt [Weiner]."

In creating a practical effect, a grid consisting of fluorescent lights was installed onto the set that housed Sterling Cooper's main office. The show's art department bought several 2-by-2 four-tube fixtures, which was determined to be accurate relative to the time period. The shipments arrived on the first day of filming the pilot. However, examination by the set-lighting crew revealed the lightbulbs used were internally modernized, having been designed to hold T-8 bulbs measuring two feet each. "Getting more than 800 2-foot color-corrected T-8 tubes became a major issue, and none of the regular suppliers had enough in stock," recalled Mike Ambrose, the gaffer for the production team in Los Angeles. "Movietone stopped production of whatever bulbs it was making, retooled the plant and started manufacturing the T-8s we needed. The last shipment arrived the morning of our first day of shooting."

Abraham created a light-control system in an attempt to keep the overhead from being unflattering. However, after unsuccessfully attempting to implement the necessary wiring to control each light, the production team established controlling rows of light. Pat O'Mara, the key grip during production, installed several 2x1 and 2x2 blackout panels and frames that were retrofitted with small albeit strong magnets. During a scene when an actor or actresses stood under a fluorescent light, a panel or a frame was placed over the fixture, subsequently diffusing light onto their faces. "If somebody was walking through the office in a wide shot, I just turned the overhead lights on. But if Don was talking to someone at his desk and the office was the backdrop, I turned all the lights on and then selectively removed some; then, I brought the key around with Kino Flo Image 80s through 4-by-8 frames of 250 or 216, or sourced my key with a larger Fresnel through the window."

The set containing Sterling Cooper's corporate offices contained skypans fitted with 5K bulbs onto the centers, which measured 8 inches apart. Ambrose collaborated with the production team to institute twenty-five inch trusses on chain motors and to devise dollys with Arri Alexa cameras that were eventually installed on aluminum I-beams. Ambrose proclaimed that the flexibility of the trolleys and chain motors enabled production to move more efficiently in concentrating on the design of the window. He added: "We also had four 20Ks and a few more T-12s on stands that could be rolled around the office floor. For tungsten close-ups, we often used Barger-Baglite six- and three-light units with Chimeras, soft cloth, diaper baffles and 60- and 90-degree honeycomb grids for control." In comparison, Ambrose used traditional lighting when creating the housing for the character, as he favored the color spectrum of a household lightbulb. For example, Don's home required four to five rooms to be lit simultaneously. "We used a lot of batten strips with 100-watt household bulbs," noted Ambrose. "The bulbs are so close they're almost touching, so they create a single source that doesn't cast multiple shadows. Over time, we built housings for them with channels into which you can slide diffusion frames or egg crates. We call them 'Whiteys' because the guy who knocked these shells out of tin back in New York was named Whitey; I used them extensively on The Sopranos and felt they suited the homes in Mad Men as well."

== Reception ==
=== Controversy ===
In the days leading to the "Smoke Gets in Your Eyes" premiere, the watchdog group Commercial Alert filed a complaint against producers to the Distilled Spirits Council of the United States. Commentators from the group criticized distillery brand Jack Daniel's for its decision to sponsor Mad Men, citing that it violates industry codes that prohibit alcohol marketing, as well as "depictions of irresponsible drinking, overt sexual activity or sexually lewd images". Robert Weissman, the director for Commercial Alert, stated that based on AMC's website, "it appears that the sponsorship arrangement will violate numerous provisions of the industry's self-regulatory marketing code." He continued: "There is no reason why a company should be able to escape normal enforcement and implementation of the Code simply because it chooses to violate the code in such brazen manner that curing the violation would cause non-trivial complications for a major television series." In association with the complaint, Weissman urged in his letter that the Distilled Spirits Council of the United States become more proactive in regulating the distilleries' initiatives in the entertainment industry. "Our complaint in this instance is not with the portrayal of heavy alcohol consumption, or even with the glorification of such heavy consumption; it is specific to industry sponsorship of and entwinement with such portrayals. Quite different issues are raised where artists choose to depict such activities in the absence of industry sponsorship."

=== Ratings and critical response ===
"Smoke Gets in Your Eyes" was originally broadcast on July 19, 2007 in the United States on AMC. Upon airing, the episode achieved a 1.4 rating (1.2 million households) according to the Nielsen Media Research. Total viewership was 75 percent higher than all television programming airing on Thursdays on AMC.

Mad Men [...] sets the bar extremely high for the competition, both summer and fall. Presenting the most vivid picture of early '60s social oddities that I can recall [...], Mad Men offers a snapshot of bygone times that is a pure joy to watch, from the incredible costumes and sets to the deliciously claustrophobic depiction of work and domestic life it presents.

— Heather Havrilesky of Salon

Television commentators praised the pilot episode. Heather Havrilesky of Salon declared that "Smoke Gets in Your Eyes" raised expectations for future competition at the time, and added that it emulated some of the best episodes of The Sopranos. Chicago Tribune journalist Maureen Ryan said that it was an "intelligently made character drama". In his four star review, Adam Buckman of New York Post described it as "stunning" and suggested that Mad Men "just happens to be the finest new TV series of the summer and possibly the entire year". Tim Goodman of the San Francisco Chronicle and Brian Lowry of Variety lauded the episode for its historical accuracy; "Just because they're on the cusp of a new decade does not mean they can see what viewers already know is around the corner," stated Goodman. "That impending change gives an extra dimension of perspective to the series." Lowry addressed that despite the subtle approach of Mad Men, it managed to provoke a profound meaning. "In that context, the show illustrates that period's own form of excess without wagging fingers, while reminding us that before sex, drugs and rock 'n' roll, there was sexual harassment, free-flowing cocktails and bluesy ballads, invariably sung by white guys." USA Today writer Robert Bianco echoed synonymous sentiment: "Mad Men is a joy to watch—the clothes, the clocks, the furniture, it's like a mid-century night's dream. But this is no mere period piece. It's a smart, complex drama that attempts to get through the facades that have always hidden the truth."

Troy Patterson of Slate drew comparisons to the HBO comedy-drama Sex and the City, and affirmed that it introduced a lewd and cynical perspective of the so-called "golden age" of advertisement. Nancy Franklin of The New Yorker concluded that "Smoke Gets in Your Eyes" was "smart and tremendously attractive", while Seattle Post-Intelligencer journalist Melanie McFarland felt that it was a rarity compared to other television installments. Writing for the Boston Globe, Matthew Gilbert remarked that the setting and design were immediately distinguishable. Gilbert wrote, "This is a gorgeously fashioned period piece, from its IBM typewriters and rotary phones to the constant fog of cigarette smoke hanging over every scene. The show has a subtle color palette, to match the ivory metal Venetian blinds at the Sterling Cooper ad agency offices, but it may sit in your memory as if it had been filmed in black and white." Citing its authenticity as an episode highlight, Randy Cordova from the Arizona Republic noted that "Smoke Gets in Your Eyes" was well-constructed.

Some critics were less enthusiastic than the general consensus. Although The New Republic's Sacha Zimmerman stated that the episode's aesthetic features were comparable to cinematic works, she affirmed that Mad Men lacked any substance, ultimately criticizing the cultural references and the character development presented in the episode. Mad Men seems to be attempting satire without a plan," Zimmerman said. "The mood is serious, not campy, and there aren't laugh-out-loud moments, just a lot of groaners—at which point, the show simply becomes a reflection of its characters: depressing. It turns out that watching moody, cruel men and unsatisfied, put-upon women for an hour just isn't that much fun." Similarly, Tim Shale of The Washington Post concluded that despite the evocative nature of the program, "Smokes Gets in Your Eyes" fell flat; "The people in and around them spoil the show, gum up the works and shatter veracity." To New York's John Leonard, the installment felt like a "fifties leftover".

Commentators praised the performances of several cast members, specifically Hamm's portrayal of Don Draper. Goodman asserted that the acting from the cast members was one of the aspects that carried the show. Gilbert evaluated that Hamm played his character to "slick perfection".

=== Accolades ===
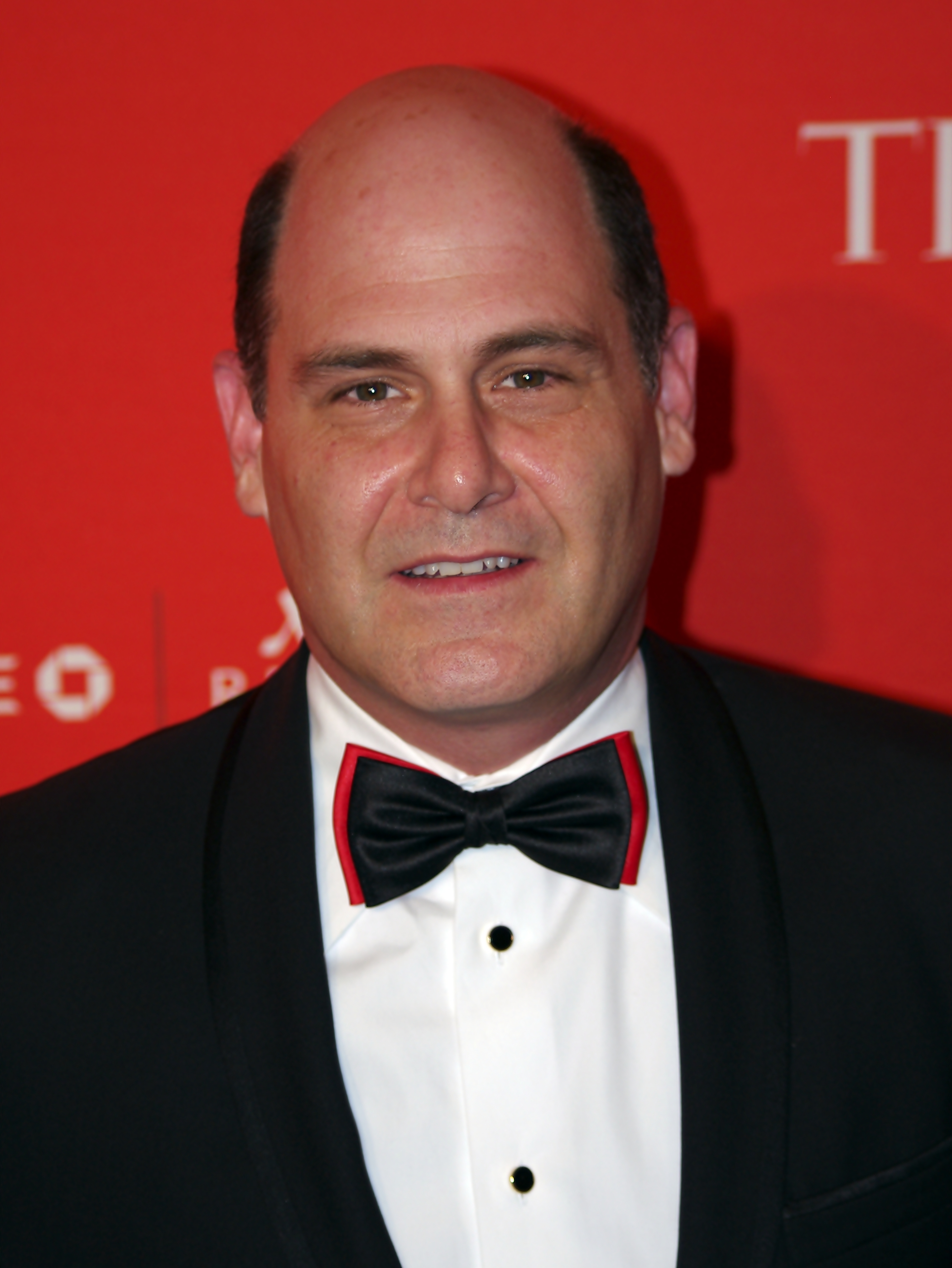
Matthew Weiner won a Primetime Emmy Award for writing the episode.

At the 60th Primetime Emmy Awards, "Smoke Gets in Your Eyes" won Outstanding Writing in a Drama Series (Matthew Weiner). The episode also won Creative Arts Emmys for Art Direction for a Single-Camera Series and Cinematography for a One Hour Series. "Smoke Gets in Your Eyes" also received a nomination for Outstanding Directing in a Drama Series (Alan Taylor) as well as Outstanding Costumes for a Series (John A. Dunn, costume designer and Lisa Padovani, assistant costume designer). The episode also won a Casting Society of America Artios Award for Outstanding Casting in a Television Pilot, Drama. Alan Taylor won a 2007 Directors Guild of America Award for Drama Series directing the episode. The episode also earned a Motion Picture Sound Editors Golden Reel Award nomination in Best Sound Editing - Dialogue and ADR for Short Form Television for Jason George (supervising sound editor), Jed M. Dodge (supervising dialogue editor), Julie Altus (ADR editor), Dale Chaloukian (dialogue editor), and Charlie Kolander (dialogue editor).
