= Anna Domino =

American singer-songwriter (born 1955)

- Also known as: Anna Virginia Taylor Delory
- Born: Anna Virginia Taylor; December 15, 1955 (age 70)
- Origin: Tokyo, Japan
- Genres: Alternative rock; art rock; art pop; dance music; pop rock
- Occupations: Musician, vocalist, songwriter
- Instruments: Vocals, guitar, keyboards
- Years active: 1984–current
- Labels: Crépuscule, LTM, Fledg'ling
- Website: Website

Anna Domino (born 1955, Anna Virginia Taylor) is an American indie rock artist based in New York and Los Angeles who released several albums for Les Disques du Crépuscule and Factory Records in the 1980s and 1990s. Domino has collaborated with musicians such as Matt Johnson of the The, Stephin Merritt in the 6ths, Blaine L. Reininger and Steven Brown of Tuxedomoon, Virginia Astley, Luc van Acker and Ultramarine. She is also one half of the duo Snakefarm.

Her stage name was borrowed from the Domino Sugar Factory in Williamsburg, visible from rooftops and upper stories in Manhattan, where she lived. It is also a play on the term Anno Domini.

== Background ==
Domino was born in an American military hospital in Tokyo, Japan in 1955. Her father, James J. Taylor, was a private in the U.S. army translating for Voice of America, stationed in Yokohama, who went on to become a videographer documenting the performing arts in the Washington, D.C. area. Her mother, Mimi Cazort, was a Curator Emerita at the National Gallery of Canada. Her brother, Alan Taylor, is a film and television director based in New York City.

During her childhood and adolescence the family moved frequently, starting in Tokyo, Japan and winding up in Ottawa, Canada. Her mother studied art history at the University of Michigan in Ann Arbor and then moved with her children to live first in Florence, Italy, while she did research for her dissertation, and then to Ottawa, Canada, where she worked for the National Gallery as curator of the Department of Prints and Drawings. Though quite shy as a child, Anna was also a bit of a show off and her hobby of memorizing and reciting comedy records in high school led to her expulsion shortly before graduation. Leaving high school, Anna and her best friend Shelley McCreadie set off for several years of unsupervised exploration. Their adventures hitch-hiking across the US and down through Mexico, left her with a stubborn conviction in the basic decency of humanity. Anna followed up with several years of study at Toronto's Ontario College of Art and Design where she focused on sound recording, video editing and hologram photography. In 1977 Anna travelled to New York City for a two-week visit and stayed for 20 years.

=== Solo ===
Early in her career Domino played with a number of New York City bands but she was determined to find an outlet for her own song writing. In 1982, a cassette of original songs recorded by Anna in her bedroom was picked up by the Belgian record label Les Disques du Crépuscule, who brought her to Brussels to work in an actual recording studio. Crépuscule released a single in 1983 titled "Trust In Love", followed by the EP "East and West" and a 12" single "‘Rythm’", in 1984. In 1986, her first full-length album "Anna Domino" was released. In the summer of 1986 she put together a band and headed off on a three-month tour of Europe. During this tour Anna got to know Michel Delory, guitarist for Bel Canto and Univers Zéro, and they collaborated on her second album "This Time", which garnered further positive critical attention and airplay. In 1989, Domino released another EP called "Colouring In the Edge and the Outline", followed by her third album "Mysteries of America" in 1990, her last with the Crépuscule label. Domino then returned to New York full-time and was joined by Michel Delory. They were married in 1992.

In 2010 Anna Domino released two new songs on a compilation that included a number of her Crépuscule colleagues. The album was called "After Twilight" and the songs were "The Light Downtown" and "Wonderkey" as well as a new version of her song "‘Rythm’".

=== Snakefarm ===
In 1999, Domino and Delory formed the folk rock alternative outfit Snakefarm, with the idea of subjecting traditional American ballads to updated arrangements. They released an album, "Songs From My Funeral" in 1999, on Kneeling Elephant/BMG in the US, available on LTM UK. Their second album "My Halo At Half-Light" was released in 2011 on the Fledg’ling label in the UK.

In 2013, Domino and Delory toured America and Europe, playing shows that alternated between Snakefarm material and Domino's solo work.

== Selected discography ==
=== Anna Domino ===
==== Albums ====
- East and West (Crépuscule, 1984)
- Anna Domino (Crépuscule, 1986)
- This Time (Crépuscule, 1987)
- Colouring in the Edge and the Outline (mini album, Crépuscule, 1988)
- L'Amour fou (compilation, Crépuscule, 1989)
- Mysteries of America (Crépuscule, 1990)
- Favourite Songs from the Twilight Years (US-compilation - Janken Pon, 1997)
- Dreamback: Best Of (LTM, 2004)

==== Singles ====
- Blood Makes Noise (EnT-T, 2010)
- Johnny (EnT-T, 2012)
- Lake (EnT-T, 2019)

==== 12" Singles ====
- "Trust in love" / "Repeating" (Crépuscule, 1983)
- "‘Rythm’" / "Target" (Crépuscule, 1984)
- "Take that" / "Koo Koo" (Crépuscule, 1985)
- "Lake" / "Hammer" (Crépuscule, 1987)
- "Tempting" / "Always Always" (Crépuscule, 1988)

==== Vinyl releases on Factory Records ====
- FACT 165 Anna Domino LP
- FAC 158 "Summer" (Arthur Baker Remix) / "Summer" (Arthur Baker Instrumental) 12"
- FAC 158/7 "Summer" (Arthur Baker Remix) / "The Hunter Gets Captured By The Game" 7" (A side is edited version)

=== Snakefarm ===
- Songs From My Funeral (Kneeling Elephant, 1999)
- My Halo At Half-Light (Fledg'ling Records 2011)
