= Mimi Cazort =

Canadian scholar and curator

Mary Ann "Mimi" Cazort (August 26, 1930 – January 27, 2014) was a scholar and a former Curator Emerita for Prints and Drawings at the National Gallery of Canada.

From 1970 to 1997, she was the Curator of Prints and Drawings at the National Gallery of Canada. She was an associate of figurative artist Carol Hoorn Fraser (1930–1991) and was married to videographer James J. Taylor (1931–2005). Cazort and Taylor were the parents of television and film director Alan Taylor and indie rocker Anna Domino.

== Exhibitions ==
- The Brownies by Palmer Cox [1840-1924]. National Gallery of Canada, 23 Nov 1979 - 13 Jan 1980
- Master Drawings from the Collection of the National Gallery of Canada. National Gallery of Canada, 11 Apr 1980 - 08 Jun 1980 (travelling)

== Published works ==
- Mr. Jackson's Mushrooms (1981)
- Bolognese drawings in North American collections, 1500-1800 [exhibition catalog] (1982)
- Ars Medica, Art, Medicine, and the Human Condition, Prints, Drawings, and Photographs From the Collection of the Philadelphia Museum of Art, contributions by Ben Bassham, Mimi Cazort, Martha Chahroudi, Frima Fox Hofrichter, John Ittmann, Ellen Jacobowitz, Ann Percy, Kimerly Rorschach, Darrel Sewell, Aaron Sheon, and Faith H. Zieske Karp (1985)
- Bella Pittura: The Art of the Gandolfi (1994)
- The Ingenious Machine of Nature: Four Centuries of Art and Anatomy (1996)
- Italian Master Drawings At The Philadelphia Museum Of Art, (2000) with Ann Percy
- Mauro in America: An Italian Artist Visits the New World (2003)
- Beauty Of Another Order: Photography In Science (1997) Ann Thomas, Marta Braun, Mimi Cazort, Martin Kemp, John P. McElhone, Larry J. Schaaf
