= The North Remembers =

- Game of Thrones episode
- Episode no.: Season 2 Episode 1
- Directed by: Alan Taylor
- Written by: David Benioff; D. B. Weiss
- Cinematography by: Kramer Morgenthau
- Editing by: Frances Parker
- Original air date: April 1, 2012
- Running time: 52 minutes

Guest appearances
- Donald Sumpter as Maester Luwin; Ron Donachie as Rodrik Cassel; Julian Glover as Grand Maester Pycelle; Robert Pugh as Craster; Natalia Tena as Osha; Oliver Ford Davies as Maester Cressen; Mark Stanley as Grenn; Ben Crompton as Eddison Tollett; Joe Dempsie as Gendry; Ben Hawkey as Hot Pie; Eros Vlahos as Lommy Greenhands; Roxanne McKee as Doreah; Amrita Acharia as Irri; Elyes Gabel as Rakharo; Steven Cole as Kovarro; Kristian Nairn as Hodor; Esmé Bianco as Ros; Dominic Carter as Janos Slynt; Kerr Logan as Matthos Seaworth; Tony Way as Ser Dontos Hollard; Hannah Murray as Gilly; Karl Davies as Alton Lannister; Ian Beattie as Ser Meryn Trant; Sahara Knite as Armeca; Maisie Dee as Daisy; Antonia Christophers as Mhaegen; Callum Wharry as Tommen Baratheon; Aimee Richardson as Myrcella Baratheon; Andrew Wilde as Tobho Mott

Episode chronology
← Previous "Fire and Blood"	Next → "The Night Lands"
- Game of Thrones season 2

"The North Remembers" is the second season premiere episode of HBO's fantasy television series Game of Thrones. First aired on April 1, 2012, it was written by the show creators and executive producers David Benioff and D. B. Weiss, and directed by returning director Alan Taylor.

With a war on the horizon, the Seven Kingdoms are witnessing an ever-growing clash of kings. Joffrey sits on the Iron Throne guided by cruelty and deceit, while Robb Stark of the North heads south to avenge his father's death. Meanwhile, the late Robert Baratheon's estranged brother Stannis emerges as yet another claimant to the throne. A frantic search for King Robert's bastard sons ensues, while Cersei Lannister sets to find the missing Arya in order to retrieve her lover and brother Jaime, now a captive to the Starks. The title refers to Robb vowing revenge against the Lannisters for his father's murder.

In the United States, "The North Remembers" achieved a viewership of 3.86 million in its initial broadcast. The episode introduced a number of new cast members, including Stephen Dillane's Stannis, Carice van Houten's Melisandre, and Liam Cunningham as "the onion knight" Davos Seaworth. It also featured a number of new locations, both fictional and real, most notably the city of Dubrovnik, Croatia, which served as the capital city of King's Landing. It received a great amount of critical praise, with critics noting Tyrion Lannister's (Peter Dinklage) development as a key player as a highlight of the episode and welcoming the new set of characters, which they saw as a great addition. The episode went on to win an American Society of Cinematographers for Outstanding Achievement in Cinematography in One-Hour Episodic Television Series.

== Plot ==
=== On Dragonstone ===
From the island of Dragonstone, Stannis declares himself rightful heir to the Iron Throne. He sends a message across the Seven Kingdoms that Robert's supposed heirs are the products of incest between Cersei and Jaime. Despite Ser Davos Seaworth's advice, Stannis refuses to ally with Robb or Renly.

Fearing the influence that the Red Priestess Melisandre holds over Stannis, Maester Cressen attempts to kill Melisandre in a murder-suicide with poisoned wine, but Melisandre drinks the entire cup unaffected while he dies.

=== In the Red Waste ===
With the remnants of Drogo's khalasar, Daenerys makes a difficult journey across the Red Waste, and sends three riders to find shelter.

=== Beyond The Wall ===
The Night's Watch ranging party reaches Craster's Keep beyond the Wall. Craster claims that the wildlings' leader Mance Rayder is amassing an army to move south. Mormont offers leadership advice to Jon.

=== At Winterfell ===
Bran and Luwin meet with the Stark bannermen and other subjects to hear petitions and settle disputes in Robb's absence, during which Luwin offers Bran advice on leadership. After a prophetic dream, Bran visits the Godswood with Osha. Noticing a red comet, Bran declares it an omen of victory in the war, but Osha insists it means dragons have returned.

=== In the Riverlands ===
Robb informs the captive Jaime of Stannis' letter, surmising that Bran was crippled and Ned killed by the orders of Joffrey. Robb sends Jaime's cousin Alton to King's Landing with terms for peace, including the return of Sansa and Arya and Ned's remains, and acknowledgement of Northern independence; Theon to ask his father, Lord Balon Greyjoy, for the naval force of the Iron Islands; and Catelyn to negotiate an alliance with Renly's court. Catelyn tells Robb his father would be proud, but warns him not to trust Balon.

=== In King's Landing ===
During combats to celebrate Joffrey, the captive Sansa saves the drunkard Ser Dontos Hollard by convincing Joffrey to make him a fool. Tyrion, sent as Hand of the King in his father's stead, mocks Cersei for letting Arya escape, having planned to trade the Stark girls for Jaime.

Cersei dismisses Stannis' letter to Joffrey as gossip. The City Watch murders Robert's bastards, discovering too late that one, Gendry, has already left the city traveling to the Wall. Unbeknownst to the Lannisters, Arya is also with that caravan.

== Production ==
=== Writing ===
The episode was written by producers David Benioff and D. B. Weiss, based on the original work of George R. R. Martin. As the second season covers mostly A Clash of Kings, the second book of the series, the first episode adapts the material from the first chapters of the book including the Prologue, Sansa I, Tyrion I, Bran I, Catelyn I, Davos I, the first half of Daenerys I and Jon III (chapters 1, 3–5, 7, 10, 12, and 23). Two chapters from the beginning of the book had already been included in season 1's finale, while Jon Snow's story is being pushed forward.

=== Casting ===
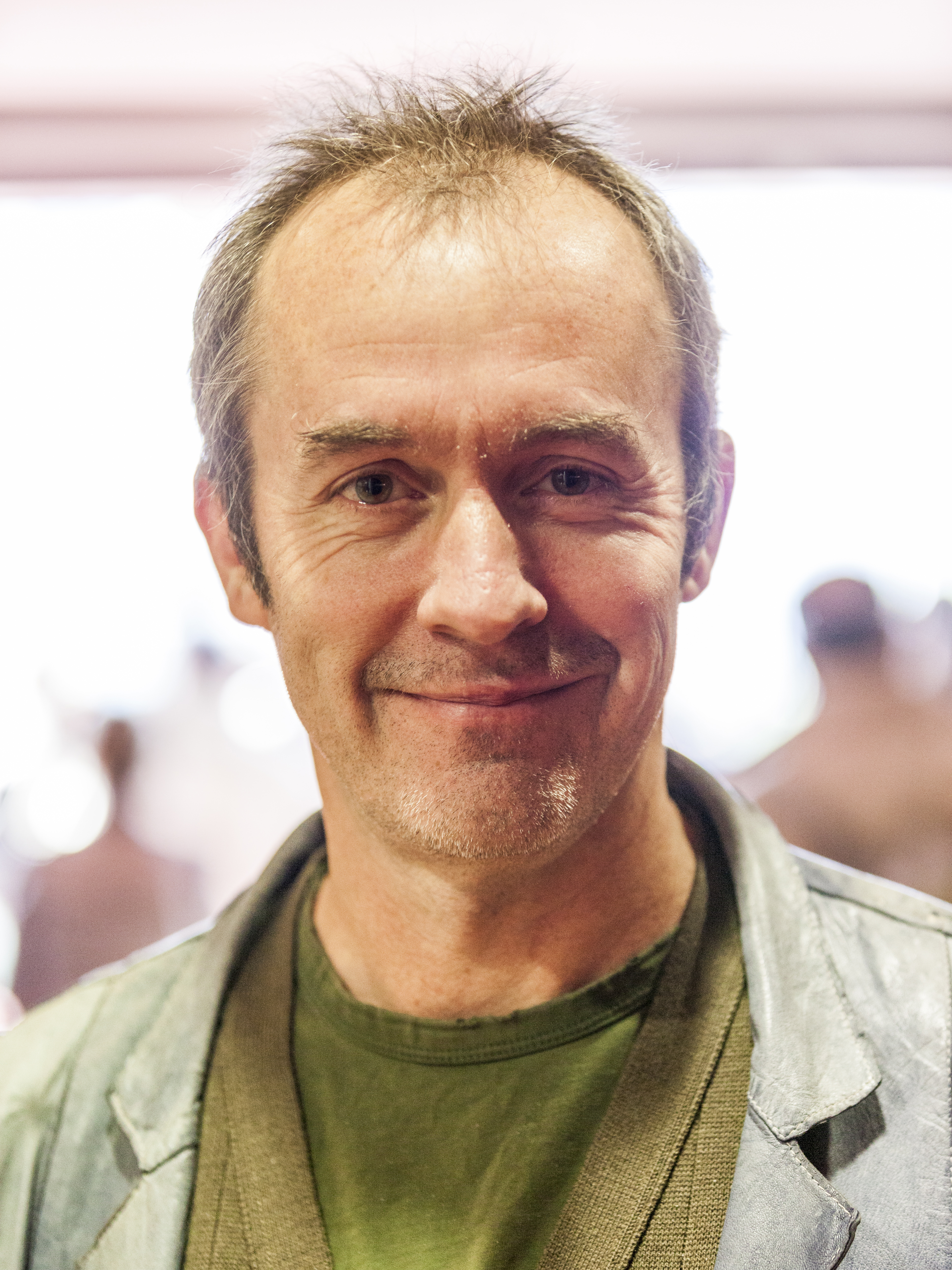
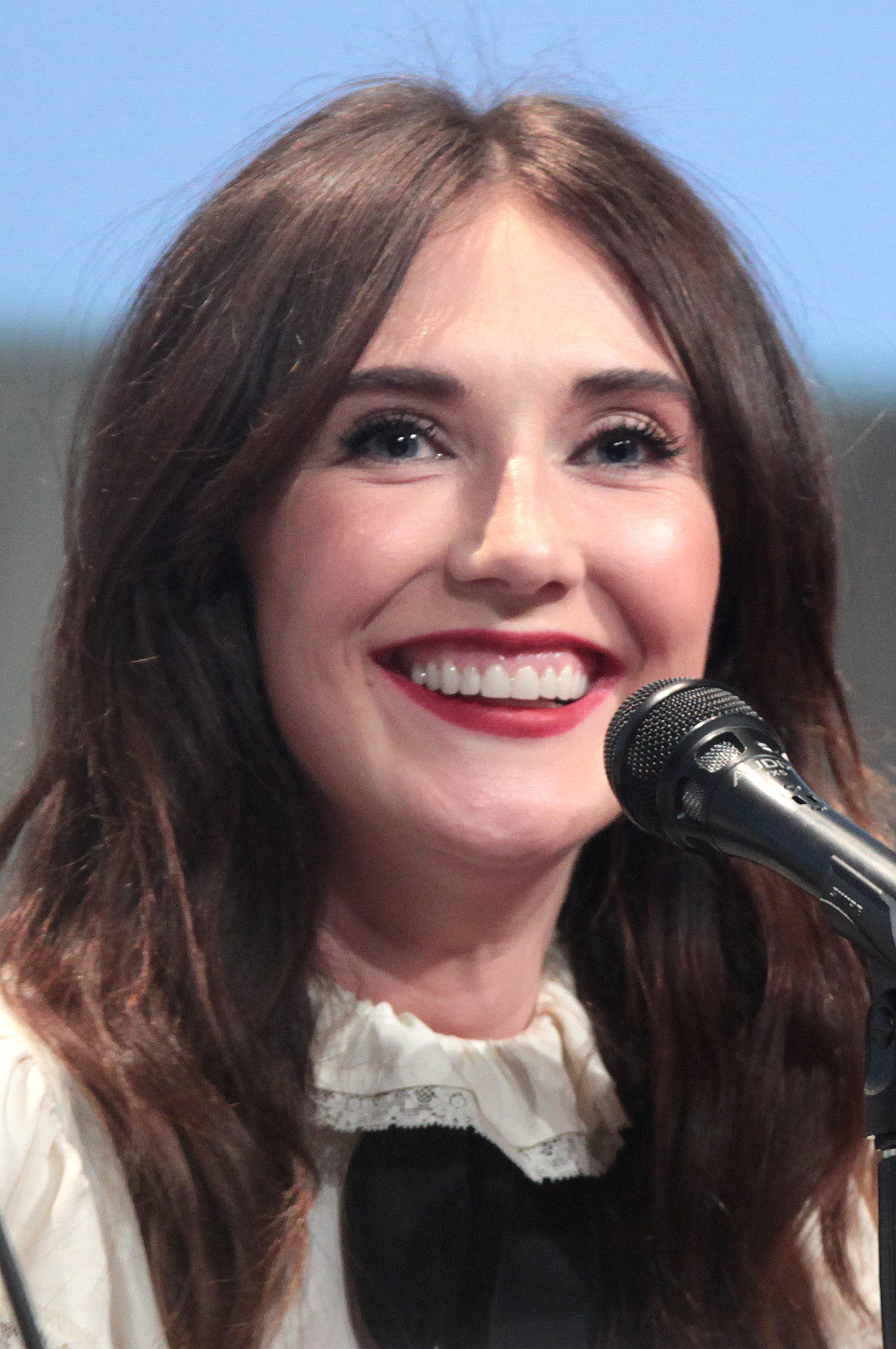
Stephen Dillane and Carice van Houten joined the cast as Stannis Baratheon and the red priestess Melisandre

This episode introduces several prominent characters, most notably Stannis Baratheon (Stephen Dillane), Ser Davos Seaworth (Liam Cunningham), and Melisandre (Carice van Houten). The three of them represent the head of an entirely new storyline that intertwines with other plotlines as the season progresses. Other recurring characters introduced in this episode are drunken knight Ser Dontos Hollard (Tony Way), the Starks' captive Alton Lannister (Karl Davies), Melisandre's opponent Maester Cressen (Oliver Ford Davies), Davos's son Matthos Seaworth (Kerr Logan), Night's Watch member Dolorous Edd (Ben Crompton), Wildling Craster (Robert Pugh), and his daughter and wife Gilly (Hannah Murray).

The episode also marks the upgrade of several returning characters to the main cast. John Bradley-West returns as Jon Snow's friend Sam Tarly, James Cosmo as the Lord Commander of the Night's Watch Jeor Mormont, Jerome Flynn as Tyrion's cunning servant Bronn, with Sibel Kekilli as Tyrion's concubine Shae, and lastly Conleth Hill as the gossiping eunuch Varys. Peter Dinklage takes the place of Sean Bean as the first credit during the intro sequence. Since Bean's character was killed at the end of last season, Dinklage jokingly wished that he could stay being the lead credit for some time.

=== Filming locations ===
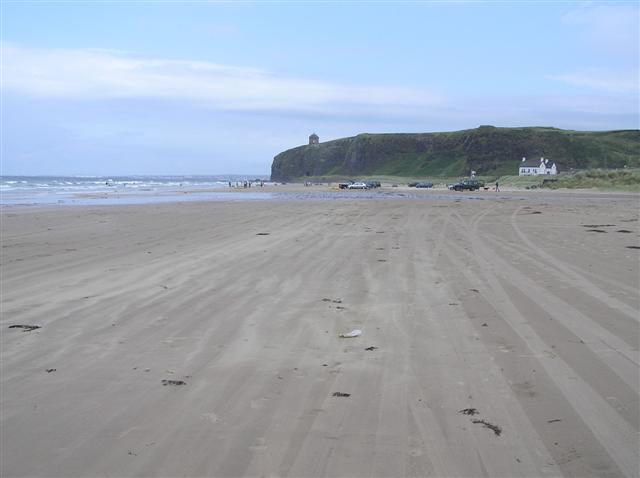
Downhill Strand was used to represent a beach of the island of Dragonstone, where the statues of the Seven were burned

The production continued using the Paint Hall studios as the filming headquarters and the Northern Irish landscapes for many of the exterior shots. The burning of the Seven was filmed at the beach of Downhill Strand, where local press echoed the stir that the filming caused to the small community of Castlerock. Craster's keep beyond the Wall was built in a forest in Clandeboye Estate. David Benioff and D. B. Weiss stated in their audio commentary track that while most scenes set north of the Wall were filmed in Iceland, the Craster's Keep scenes were filmed in Northern Ireland, as the lack of significant tree growth in Iceland prevented them filming forest scenes there. The closing sequence, of a caravan heading north along the Kingsroad, bringing Arya to Winterfell and Robert Baratheon's illegitimate son Gendry and the other passengers onward to Castle Black, was shot at the "Dark Hedges", an avenue of gnarly beech trees near Armoy, County Antrim.

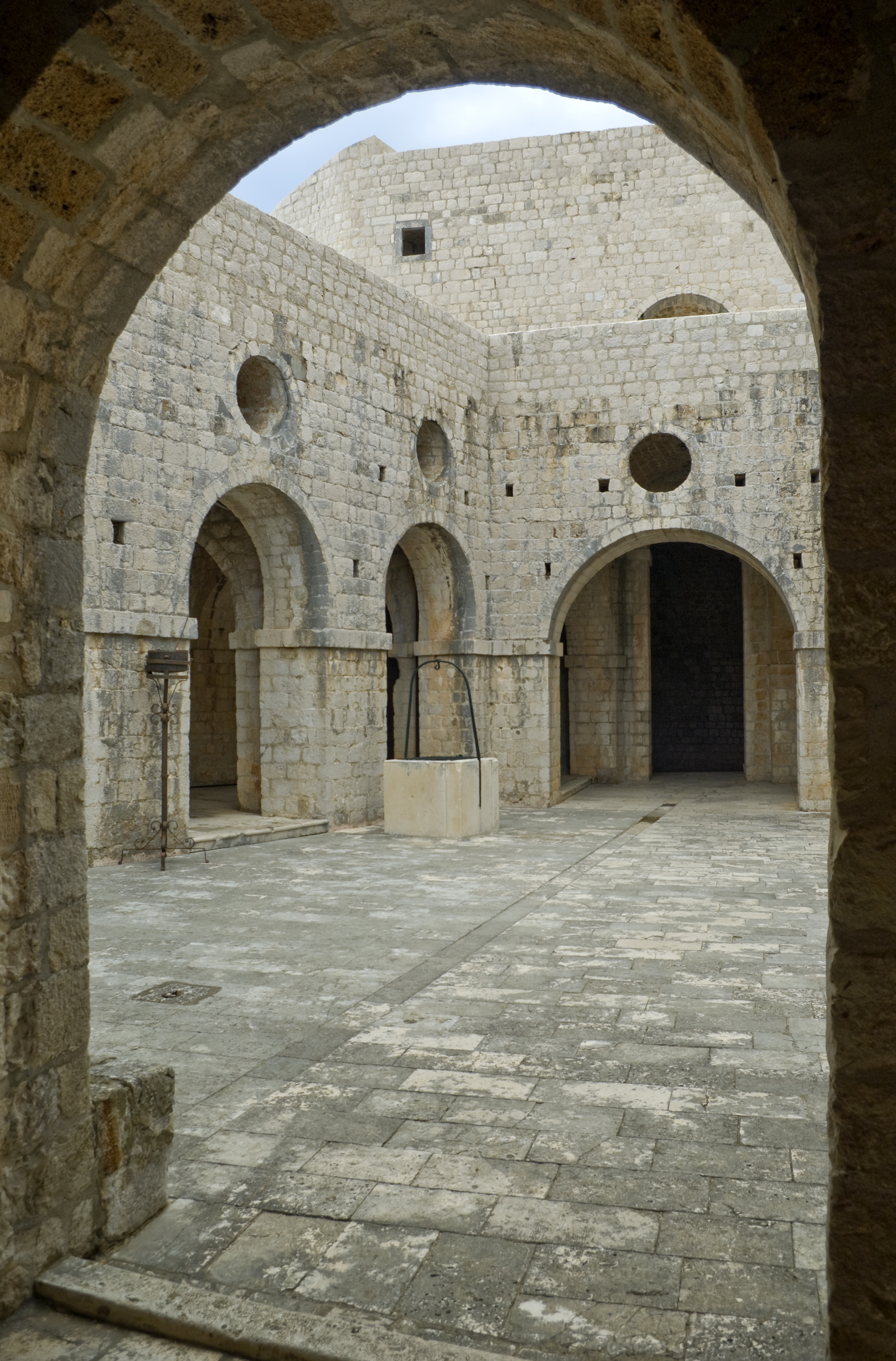
Joffrey's name day tourney was filmed at Fort Lovrijenac

For the exteriors of the capital city of King's Landing, that had been doubled for Malta for the entire season 1, now the production flew to the Croatian city of Dubrovnik. Known as The Pearl of the Adriatic, the city proved to be a good representation of King's Landing since it shared many characteristics with the fictional capital: it had a well-preserved medieval look, with high walls and the sea at its side. According to David Benioff, executive producer of the show, "The minute we started walking around the city walls we knew that was it. You read the descriptions in the book and you come to Dubrovnik and that's what the actual city is. It has the sparkling sea, sun and beautiful architecture."

The first scene of the episode, depicting the celebration of King Joffrey's name day, was filmed on Dubrovnik's Fort Lovrijenac (also called St. Lawrence Fortress). The later debate about the nature of power between Cersei and Littlefinger also takes place in its porch, and in the final montage with the killing of the bastards the Old City of Dubrovnik and its famed walls can be clearly seen.

The scenery in Daenerys's desert scenes was filled in with CGI; however, the production filmed desert scenes in Morocco in season 3.

== Reception ==
=== Ratings ===
The viewership of the episode on its premiere airing in the US rose to a new series' top of 3.858 million viewers, with a rating of 2.0 in the relevant 18-49 demographic on HBO. Taking into account the additional airings of the night the number of viewers totaled 6.3 million. In the United Kingdom, the episode was seen by 0.928 million viewers on Sky Atlantic, being the channel's highest-rated broadcast that week.

=== Critical reception ===
The episode received universal critical acclaim. Review aggregator Rotten Tomatoes surveyed 28 reviews of the episode and judged 100% of them to be positive, with an average score of 8.6 out of 10. The website's critical consensus reads, "'The North Remembers' underscores Joffrey's capacity for cruelty and Tyrion's development as a key player in a compelling sophomore season opener." Matt Fowler of IGN rated the episode 9 out of 10. The A.V. Club gave it B+. Alan Sepinwall, who reviewed the episode for HitFix, called it "a great beginning. Funny in spots, scary in others, never blinking away from the cruelty of this world and this war."

Andy Greenwald of Grantland praised the episode for its new additions of Dillane and Van Houten, its setup of later episodes, and its themes. "It's also evident that the second year of Thrones, if not the remainder of the series, is about a race to fill what may well be an impossible vacuum. [...] Everything feels thrillingly unsettled, as if the rules are constantly changing and the biggest prize may actually be a booby trap." Luke Broadwater, writing for The Baltimore Sun, enjoyed Tyrion's increased role, referring to him as the new lead of the series after the death of Eddard Stark (Sean Bean). He thought that the episode "excelled in underscoring Joffrey's cruelty...and Tyrion's humor and growth as a character." However, his commentary was not all positive; the reviewer criticized the scene in which Littlefinger threatens Cersei and thought that Maester Cressen should have been kept alive longer. In her recap of the episode, Jenifer D Braun of The Star-Ledger wrote that the episode contained the sex and violence that the show had had in its first season and stated, "Man, I missed this show, didn't you?"

Sarah Hughes of The Guardian was very complimentary towards the episode as a season premiere, remarking that "The season opener deftly covers a huge amount of scene-setting while introducing a host of new characters." In addition, she praised the episode's adaptation of the source novels for including a large number of important scenes and storylines with minimal filler: "this was a leanly written episode, which tackled a huge amount of exposition and scene-setting but never wasted a word." Nina Shen Rastogi, writing for Vulture, thought that the episode served as both a redefinition of the plot and a reintroduction of the first seasons's themes of violence and succession. She wrote, "from the very first scene of last night's season premiere, GoT strove to reassure us that some things would never change." Simon Abrams of Slant Magazine lauded "The North Remembers" as a "thematically focused" episode on the subject of good leadership. He enjoyed how each of the rulers were developed in the premiere and hoped that the rest of the season "can keep up with its premiere's big ideas."

=== Accolades ===
This episode won an American Society of Cinematographers for Outstanding Achievement in Cinematography in One-Hour Episodic Television Series.
