= Alan Taylor (director) =

American television and film director

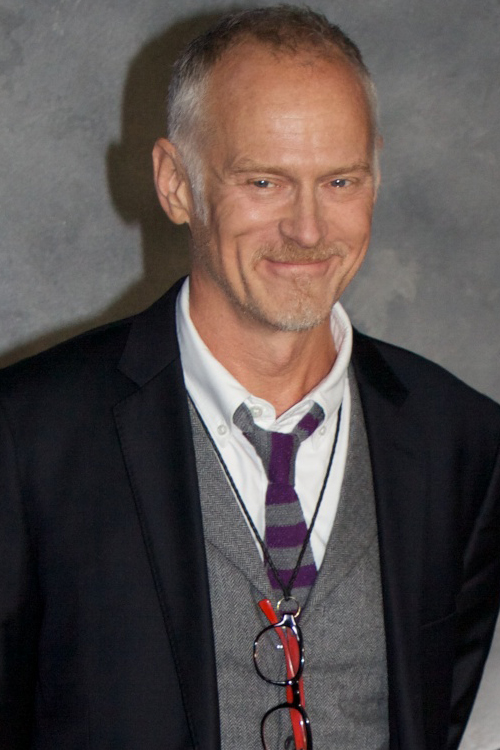
- Taylor in 2013
- Born: January 13, 1959 (age 67); Ann Arbor, Michigan, U.S.
- Education: University of Toronto, Columbia University, New York University
- Occupations: Television director, film director, screenwriter, television producer
- Years active: 1990–present
- Spouse: Nicki Ledermann (m. 2005–2020)
- Children: Willa Taylor, Ginger Taylor, Jem Taylor

Alan Taylor (born January 13, 1959) is an American television director, film director, screenwriter, and television producer. He is best known for his work on television series such as The Sopranos, Sex and the City, Mad Men, and Game of Thrones. He also directed films such as Palookaville, Thor: The Dark World, Terminator Genisys, and The Many Saints of Newark.

In 2007, Taylor won a Primetime Emmy Award for Outstanding Directing for a Drama Series for The Sopranos episode "Kennedy and Heidi". In 2008 and 2018, he was also nominated in the same category for the Mad Men episode "Smoke Gets in Your Eyes" and the Game of Thrones episode "Beyond the Wall", respectively.

== Early life ==
Taylor's father, James J. Taylor, was a private in the U.S. army translating for Voice of America, stationed in Yokohama, who subsequently held numerous jobs before becoming a videographer in Washington, D.C. Taylor's mother, Mimi Cazort, was curator emerita for the National Gallery of Canada. His sister is the indie rock musician Anna Domino.

He spent part of his life in Manor Park, Ottawa, Canada, and attended Manor Park Public School and Lisgar Collegiate Institute high school. As part of the Communications Club at Lisgar, he acted in its production of The Mouse That Roared. He went on to major in history at the University of Toronto and then at New York City's Columbia University before transferring to New York University in his late 20s to study film under instructors including director Martin Scorsese.

== Career ==
Taylor has directed for numerous programs on both network television and premium cable, most often on HBO.

Taylor's early work on television include work on The Sopranos, Sex and the City, and The West Wing. Taylor joined the crew of the HBO western drama Deadwood as a director for the first season in 2004. Taylor directed the pilot episodes of Mad Men ("Smoke Gets in Your Eyes") and Bored to Death as well as subsequent episodes of each. He joined the HBO series Game of Thrones, directing seven episodes including critically acclaimed season 1 episode "Baelor." He worked on a television adaptation of the Strugatsky brothers' 1971 science fiction novel Roadside Picnic for the WGN America network. Besides his television work, Taylor's early films include Palookaville, The Emperor's New Clothes, and Kill the Poor.

In the 2010s, Taylor began working on large budget blockbuster films. He was hired to direct Thor: The Dark World (2013) a superhero film and sequel to 2011's Thor. He was approached by Marvel producer Kevin Feige following director Patty Jenkins exit from the project and hoped he would inject a darker tone into the project after seeing Taylor's work on Game of Thrones. Taylor's next film was Terminator Genisys, a film that Taylor hoped to fix following his reading of the script, citing his love of the first two Terminator films. After directing nine episodes for the HBO series The Sopranos, Taylor was approached by show creator David Chase to return to direct the 2021 prequel film The Many Saints of Newark.

In August 2022, it was announced that Taylor was hired to direct multiple episodes of the second season of House of the Dragon. He notably directed the fictional Battle of Rook's Rest in "The Red Dragon and the Gold.

== Personal life ==
Taylor currently lives in Tyler Hill, Pennsylvania. He has three children with award-winning makeup artist Nicki Ledermann.

== Directing filmography ==
Film

Year	Title	Director	Writer	Notes
1982	That Burning Question	Yes	Yes	Short film
1995	Palookaville	Yes	No	
2001	The Emperor's New Clothes	Yes	Yes	
2003	Kill the Poor	Yes	No	
2013	Thor: The Dark World	Yes	No	
2015	Terminator Genisys	Yes	No	
2021	The Many Saints of Newark	Yes	No	

Television

- That Burning Question (1982) TV special
- Homicide: Life on the Street (1993) TV series
  - episode 1.07 "A Dog and Pony Show"
  - episode 4.03 "Autofocus"
  - episode 4.20 "The Wedding"
  - episode 5.08 "The True Test"
  - episode 6.01 "Blood Ties, Part 1"
  - episode 6.16 "Mercy"
  - episode 7.22 "Forgive Us Our Trespasses"
- Oz (1997) TV series
  - episode 1.06 "To Your Health"
  - episode 2.06 "Strange Bedfellows"
- Trinity (1998) TV series
  - episode 1.08 "Breaking In, Breaking Out, Breaking Up, Breaking Down"
- Sex and the City (1998) TV series
  - episode 2.09 "Old Dogs, New Dicks"
  - episode 2.14 "The Fuck Buddy"
  - episode 4.15 "Change of a Dress"
  - episode 4.16 "Ring a Ding-Ding"
  - episode 6.07 "The Post-it Always Sticks Twice"
  - episode 6.08 "The Catch"
- Now and Again (1999) TV series
  - episode 1.03 "Over Easy"
- The Sopranos (1999) TV series
  - episode 1.06 "Pax Soprana"
  - episode 4.10 "The Strong, Silent Type"
  - episode 5.02 "Rat Pack"
  - episode 6.04 "The Fleshy Part of the Thigh"
  - episode 6.09 "The Ride"
  - episode 6.12 "Kaisha"
  - episode 6.14 "Stage 5"
  - episode 6.18 "Kennedy and Heidi"
  - episode 6.20 "The Blue Comet"
- The West Wing (1999) TV series
  - episode 1.08 "Enemies"
  - episode 1.16 "20 Hours in L.A."
- Six Feet Under (2001) TV series
  - episode 2.08 "It's the Most Wonderful Time of the Year"
- Keen Eddie (2003)
  - episode 1.11 "Sticky Fingers"
- Carnivàle (2003) TV series
  - episode 2.07 "Damascus, NE"
- Deadwood (2004) TV series
  - episode 1.04 "Here Was a Man"
  - episode 2.04 "Requiem for a Gleet"
- Lost (2004) TV series
  - episode 2.04 "Everybody Hates Hugo"
- Rome (2005) TV series
  - episode 1.10 "Triumph"
  - episode 1.12 "Kalends of February"
- Big Love (2006) TV series
  - episode 1.05 "Affair"
- Mad Men (2007) TV series
  - episode 1.01 "Smoke Gets in Your Eyes"
  - episode 1.02 "Ladies Room"
  - episode 1.12 "Nixon vs. Kennedy"
  - episode 2.12 "The Mountain King"
- Law & Order (1990) TV series
  - episode 18.05 "Driven"
- In Treatment (2008) TV series
  - episode 2.19 "Walter – Week 4"
- Nurse Jackie (2009) TV series
  - episode 2.03 "Candyland"
  - episode 2.04 "Apple Bong"
- Rubicon (2010) TV series
  - episode 1.09 "No Honesty in Men"
- Boardwalk Empire (2010) TV series
  - episode 1.05 "Nights in Ballygran"
- Game of Thrones (2011) TV series
  - episode 1.09 "Baelor"
  - episode 1.10 "Fire and Blood"
  - episode 2.01 "The North Remembers"
  - episode 2.02 "The Night Lands"
  - episode 2.08 "The Prince of Winterfell"
  - episode 2.10 "Valar Morghulis"
  - episode 7.06 "Beyond the Wall"
- The Playboy Club (2011) TV series)
  - episode 1.01 "Pilot"
- Electric Dreams (2017) TV series
  - episode 1.09 "Safe and Sound"
- Interview with the Vampire (2022) TV series
  - episode 1.01 "In Throes of Increasing Wonder..."
  - episode 1.02 "...After the Phantoms of Your Former Self"
- The Crowded Room (2023) TV Miniseries
  - episode 07 "The Crowded Room"
- Blue Eye Samurai (2023) TV series
  - episode 1.07 "Nothing Broken"
- House of the Dragon (2024) TV series
  - episode 2.01 "A Son for a Son"
  - episode 2.04 "The Red Dragon and the Gold"
