= James J. Taylor =

James J. Taylor (c. 1931 – February 10, 2005) was a videographer instrumental in the creation of the Washington Area Performing Arts Video Archive.

== Biography ==
Taylor was born and raised in St. Louis, Missouri and graduated from Washington University in St. Louis. He entered the creative arts working as a technician and stage crew member for a college production of the Mozart opera Così fan tutte during his senior year. Drafted after college into the U.S. Army, he was stationed in Japan and learned Chinese military terminology until being discharged in 1956. He then earned a master's degree in cultural anthropology from the University of Michigan.

He went on to take graduate courses in public administration and urban planning, and became a city planner in the 1960s, beginning in St. Louis. He went on to work in Cleveland, Ohio, and by the 1970s, Washington, D.C. In 1977, he left his career to enter theater, becoming a stage manager at Stage 70, which later became the Round House Theatre in Montgomery County, Maryland, with the troupe the New Playwrights. He learned videography in the late 1980s while directing programs at a Montgomery County public-access cable channel.

Using inheritance money after his father's death, he bought video equipment and began recording and editing live theater for archival purposes, securing permission from the Actors' Equity Association in New York City to tape stage performances in Washington. His recordings of area theater and dance from 1993 formed the basis and the bulk of the Washington Area Performing Arts Video Archive, stored at the Washington, D.C. Public Library system. In December 2004, the archive was donated to the University of Maryland's Michelle Smith Performing Arts Library. On March 28, 2005, following Taylor's death the previous month, the archive was named after him.

== Personal life ==
Taylor married and divorced Mimi Cazort, Curator Emerita at the National Gallery of Canada. Their children include indie rocker Anna Domino and TV and film director Alan Taylor. James J. Taylor, who lived in Washington, D.C., at the time of his death, died of cancer at age 74, at Washington Home Hospice.
