= Palookaville (film) =

- Theatrical release poster
- Directed by: Alan Taylor
- Written by: David Epstein
- Produced by: Uberto Pasolini
- Starring: William Forsythe; Vincent Gallo; Adam Trese; Frances McDormand
- Cinematography: John Thomas
- Edited by: David Leonard
- Music by: Rachel Portman
- Production companies: Playhouse International Pictures; The Samuel Goldwyn Company; Redwave Films
- Distributed by: The Samuel Goldwyn Company
- Release dates: September 7, 1995 (Venice Film Festival); October 25, 1996 (United States)
- Running time: 92 minutes
- Country: United States
- Language: English
- Box office: $365,284

Palookaville is a 1995 American crime comedy film directed by Alan Taylor (in his feature directorial debut) and written by David Epstein. The film is about a trio of burglars and their dysfunctional family of origin. It stars William Forsythe, Vincent Gallo, Adam Trese, and Frances McDormand. The writing is a free interpretation of three short stories by Italo Calvino.

Palookaville premiered at the Venice Film Festival on September 7, 1995, and was released theatrically in the United States on October 25, 1996, by The Samuel Goldwyn Company. It received mostly positive reviews from critics.

== Plot ==
Sid, Russ and Jerry are three wannabe criminals looking for easy money to break out of their nowhere lives. Despite a bungled jewelry store heist that exposes their incompetence, they are convinced they can pull off an armored-truck robbery. While plotting their caper, their dysfunctional families spin out of control all around them.

== Cast ==
- William Forsythe as Sid Dunleavy
- Vincent Gallo as Russell Pataki
- Adam Trese as Jerry
- Gareth Williams as Ed the Cop
- LisaGay Hamilton as Betty
- Kim Dickens as Laurie
- Suzanne Shepherd as Mother
- Nicole Burdette as Chris
- Robert LuPone as Ralph
- Sam Coppola as Mr. Kott
- Frances McDormand as June
- Douglas Seale as Old Man
- William Riker as Old Arthur
- Leonard Jackson as Bus Driver
- William Duell as Money Truck Guard
- Peter McRobbie as Chief of Police
- Nesbitt Blaisdell as Old Fritz
- Bridgit Ryan as Enid

== Reception ==
=== Critical response ===
At the time of its release, Roger Ebert gave the film 3 out of 4 stars in his review for the Chicago Sun-Times.

Review aggregator website Rotten Tomatoes later reported an approval rating of 64%, with an average rating of 6.4/10, based on 11 reviews.

=== Accolades ===
- 1995, nominated, Golden Alexander at the Thessaloniki Film Festival for director Alan Taylor
- 1997, won, Audience Award at the Tromsø International Film Festival for director Alan Taylor
- 1998, won, ALFS Award for British Producer of the Year at the London Critics Circle Film Awards for Uberto Pasolini
