= Washington Area Performing Arts Video Archive =

The Washington Area Performing Arts Video Archive (WAPAVA), located in the Washington, D.C. metropolitan area is one of only four public archives of theater and other performing arts in the United States. The archive was established in 1991 with the goal of creating and preserving a videotape collection of stage performances in the Washington, D.C. area. Archived entries must meet exceptional standards — World premieres, Washington area premieres, or are important but rarely performed productions. Such performances include theater, dance, opera, mime and storytelling.

WAPAVA also has the rare distinction of being one of only two AEA-approved performance collections in the United States.

== Relocation ==
For most of its history, the Archive has been available to the public at the DC Public Library, Washingtoniana Division. However, in the autumn of 2004, the archive announced a co-location agreement with the Clarice Smith Performing Arts Center at the University of Maryland. Under the agreement, the collection will be housed in the Michelle Smith Performing Arts Library.

Additionally, Duplicate copies of all live performance recordings will be available at the Martin Luther King Jr. Memorial Library.

== See also ==
- James J. Taylor - information on the founder of the archive.
