= Fire and Blood (Game of Thrones) =

- Game of Thrones episode
- The final scene, with Daenerys Targaryen and her dragon hatchlings, received much critical acclaim.
- Episode no.: Season 1 Episode 10
- Directed by: Alan Taylor
- Written by: David Benioff; D. B. Weiss
- Cinematography by: Alik Sakharov
- Editing by: Frances Parker
- Original air date: June 19, 2011
- Running time: 52 minutes

Guest appearances
- Donald Sumpter as Maester Luwin; Conleth Hill as Varys; Jerome Flynn as Bronn; James Cosmo as Lord Commander Jeor Mormont; Ron Donachie as Ser Rodrik Cassel; Charles Dance as Tywin Lannister; Francis Magee as Yoren; John Bradley as Samwell Tarly; Julian Glover as Grand Maester Pycelle; Emun Elliott as Marillion; Sibel Kekilli as Shae; Natalia Tena as Osha; Esmé Bianco as Ros; Clive Mantle as Lord Jon "Greatjon" Umber; Wilko Johnson as Ser Ilyn Payne; Mark Stanley as Grenn; Josef Altin as Pypar; Mia Soteriou as Mirri Maz Duur; Amrita Acharia as Irri; Elyes Gabel as Rakharo; Ian Gelder as Ser Kevan Lannister; Kristian Nairn as Hodor; Eugene Simon as Lancel Lannister; Joe Dempsie as Gendry; Ben Hawkey as Hot Pie; Eros Vlahos as Lommy Greenhands; Art Parkinson as Rickon Stark; Ian Beattie as Ser Meryn Trant; Steven Blount as Lord Rickard Karstark; Gerry O'Brien as Lord Jonos Bracken; Vinnie McCabe as Lord Leo Lefford; B.J. Hogg as Ser Addam Marbrand; Faolan Morgan as a Stark guard; Jason Momoa as Khal Drogo

Episode chronology
← Previous "Baelor"	Next → "The North Remembers"
- Game of Thrones season 1

"Fire and Blood" is the tenth and final episode of the first season of HBO's medieval fantasy television series Game of Thrones. First aired on June 19, 2011, it was written by series creators and executive producers David Benioff and D. B. Weiss, and directed by Alan Taylor.

The title of the episode is the motto of House Targaryen, and alludes to the aftermath of the previous episode's climactic events. The episode's action revolves around the Starks' reactions to Ned Stark's execution: Sansa is taken hostage, Arya flees in disguise, Robb and Catelyn lead an army against the Lannisters, and Jon Snow struggles with his divided loyalty. Across the narrow sea, Daenerys Targaryen must deal with the blood magic that has robbed her of her husband, her son, and her army.

The episode was well received by critics, who singled out the closing scene as a particularly strong way to end the first season. In the United States, the episode achieved a viewership of 3.04 million in its initial broadcast. This episode was nominated for the Primetime Emmy Award for Outstanding Special Visual Effects for a Series.

== Plot ==
=== In King's Landing ===
Joffrey forces Sansa to look at Ned and his household staff's severed heads on spikes. When Sansa says she wishes to see Joffrey's head mounted there after Joffrey says Robb's head will be, Joffrey has Meryn slap her. The Hound advises Sansa to obey Joffrey for her own safety.

Arya, rescued by Yoren, escapes with him under the alias of "Arry", a boy, to the Wall with his new recruits, including Lommy, Hot Pie, and Gendry, the late Robert's unknowing bastard son.

=== At Winterfell ===
Luwin informs Bran and Rickon of their father's execution.

=== In the Riverlands ===
At the Stark army camp, Robb vows revenge on the Lannisters after Ned's death, but Catelyn says they must first rescue Arya and Sansa. The Starks followers now support Northern independence, proclaiming Robb the "King in the North", rather than supporting Stannis or Renly, who have both claimed the Iron Throne. Jaime tells Catelyn he pushed Bran out of the tower window but does not explain why.

At the Lannister army camp, Tywin, unable to sue for peace with the Starks after Ned's execution, orders Tyrion to go to King's Landing in his stead as "Hand of the King" to keep Joffrey under control. Against his father's orders, Tyrion brings Shae with him.

=== At the Wall ===
Jon attempts to desert the Night's Watch to join Robb and avenge Ned, but Sam, Pyp, and Grenn convince him to return. The next morning, Mormont, despite knowing Jon attempted to desert, orders him to join him in an expedition beyond the Wall, intended to counter the threats of the wildlings and the White Walkers, and to find Benjen.

=== In Lhazar ===
Daenerys learns that her unborn son died due to Mirri's spell. Furthermore, although Drogo's life was saved, he has fallen into a catatonic state, causing most of his followers to abandon him. Mirri reveals that she caused this to avenge the destruction of her village and her people. Knowing that Drogo would rather die than continue living in his current state, Daenerys smothers him with a pillow.

Daenerys has Mirri tied to Drogo's funeral pyre, with her dragon's eggs placed on top. Daenerys declares herself queen of a new khalasar and steps into the lit pyre. By daybreak, Jorah and her remaining loyalists find her unharmed in the ashes, carrying three dragon hatchlings, the first born in over a century. Amazed, they bow to Daenerys.

== Production ==
=== Writing ===
The episode was written by showrunners David Benioff and D. B. Weiss. Like the rest of the first season, it adapts the plot of A Game of Thrones, the first novel in the A Song of Ice and Fire series by George R. R. Martin. The episode covers the novel's chapters 66 to 73, that is, Arya V, Bran VII, Sansa VI, Daenerys IX, Tyrion IX, Jon IX, Catelyn XI, and Daenerys X. It also covers part of the second novel, A Clash of Kings: Arya I (chapter 2) and part of Catelyn VII (chapter 55). Scenes added for the adaptation include Catelyn and Robb receiving news of Eddard's death, the revelation of Cersei and Lancel Lannister's relationship, as well as interactions between Grand Maester Pycelle, the prostitute Ros, Varys, and Littlefinger.

=== Filming ===
The dragons featured in the episode's finale were implemented by BlueBolt, the lead VFX agency for the first season. VFX supervisor Angela Barson confirmed that the CGI dragons were among the most stressful effects, prompting sleepless nights. Commenting on the episode's climactic scene where the hatchling dragons are revealed, actress Emilia Clarke told VH1, "You see the relationship that Dany has with her eggs, and you see that grow and grow and grow and kind of the intuitive connection she has with them, you see that develop really beautifully". Clarke also hinted that she expected to "get to play with some more dragons!" in the second season, based on her conversations with book author and executive producer George R.R. Martin. "VFX Data Wrangler" Naill McEvoy later confirmed that dragon presence would be increasing in season two.

To shoot the scene depicting the birth of the dragons, director Alan Taylor guided Clarke to show her fear and personal feelings of apprehension and uncertainty of being naked in front of the crew to play her character. Taylor also insisted Benioff and Weiss change the scene's setting from night to dawn (as stated in Martin's original book) so he could pull back the episode's final shot to reveal the vast landscape as the newborn dragons cried out in a dramatic fashion. Benioff and Weiss noted that "the sequence and timing of those shots were on his [Taylor's] head from the beginning. The scene is [was] pretty much exactly the one he described to us [them] before we shot a frame".

In the scene where Joffrey forces Sansa to view the heads of Ned and his entourage on spikes, one of the prosthetic heads briefly seen in profile is that of former U.S. president George W. Bush. In their commentary on the DVD release of season 1, Benioff and Weiss explained that this was not meant as a political statement, but rather because the production used the prosthetic heads that happened to be at hand. Following media reports in June 2012, HBO apologized for this shot, which their statement described as "unacceptable, disrespectful and in very bad taste". The statement also said that the shot would be edited for any future home video production and TV broadcasts. HBO removed the episode from digital download services until the scene was edited. In the edited scene, the head bears no resemblance to Bush.

== Reception ==
=== Airings and ratings ===
"Fire and Blood" was first aired on HBO in the U.S. and Canada on June 19, 2011. The episode was the most watched episode of the season and was viewed by an estimated 3.041 million viewers and received a 1.4 share among adults between the ages of 18 and 49. This means that it was seen by 1.4% of all 18- to 49-year-olds at the time of the broadcast. With repeats, the episode brought in 3.9 million total viewers. In the United Kingdom, the episode was viewed by 1.314 million viewers, making it the highest-rated broadcast that week.

=== Critical response ===
"Fire and Blood" received positive reviews, and much critical acclaim for the closing scene.

Review aggregator Rotten Tomatoes surveyed 23 reviews of the episode and judged 100% of them to be positive with an average score of 9.27 out of 10. The website's critical consensus reads, ""Fire and Blood" creatively provides closure after a shocking penultimate episode while strategically setting up arcs for season two." Matt Fowler of IGN wrote that " 'Fire and Blood' wasn't exactly a powerful roar of an episode, but that book fans would definitely appreciate the small parts of the second book, A Clash of Kings, that got included to help set up season two next year". He rated the episode 8.5 out of 10.

Emily VanDerWerff of The A.V. Club gave it an "A−", commenting:

The series, especially, has shown that it's willing to stretch some of these emotional or philosophical moments out, to really get the most out of the actors' performances and give them scenes where they can expand their characters beyond what's on the page. In a finale that could have felt too scattered—we drop in on every major character of the season who's still alive—that sense that cooler heads would rather prevent greater war but were thwarted by hotter, younger heads was what united the story.

David Sims, also writing for The A.V. Club, called it a fitting end to the season, "leaving absolutely everyone salivating for season two". Writing for the Star-Ledger, Jenifer Braun praised the episode for its set dressing ("I have to say, it's a pleasure just to look at all the shiny stuff the HBO set dressers came up with for Tywin Lannister's tent") and the authenticity of the baby dragons ("And wow, HBO, seamless special effects here. Baby Dragon looks every bit as real as the series' dogs"). HitFix said it "wrapped up its terrific first season...it was damned entertaining along the way--with the finale as possibly the most entertaining so far--and we know that at least one more season is coming. And if the creative team can keep up this level of quality, it's hard to imagine HBO shutting things down anytime soon, even with a budget that only figures to get higher. Dragons aren't cheap, but they're also amazing".

==== Awards and nominations ====
Year	Award	Category	Nominee(s)	Result	Ref.
2011	Primetime Creative Arts Emmy Awards	Outstanding Special Visual Effects	Rafael Morant, Adam McInnes, Graham Hills, Lucy Ainsworth-Taylor, Stuart Brisdon, Damien Macé, Henry Badgett, and Angela Barson	Nominated	

=== George W. Bush prop controversy and removal ===
The use of an effigy of George W. Bush's head on a spike caused HBO to issue an apology and to edit the scene.

The episode contains a scene in which Joffrey forces Sansa to look at the severed heads of her father and family household staff, impaled on spikes. After a scene of the disfigured heads is shot, one severed head resembled former U.S. president George W. Bush. HBO quickly began removing and editing the scene as it sparked political outrage on social media. The beheaded prop was edited to resemble an ordinary head prop.

Some politicians began calling for a boycott of the series, describing the scene as 'despicable'. Creators David Benioff and D.B. Weiss both apologized for the filming of the prop, stating:

We use a lot of prosthetic body parts on the show; heads, arms etc. We cannot afford to have all these made from scratch, especially in the scenes where we need a lot of them, so we rent them in bulk. After the scene was already shot, someone pointed out that one of the heads looked like George W. Bush. In the DVD commentary, we mentioned this, though we should not have. We meant no disrespect to the former President and apologize if anything we said or did suggested otherwise.
