= Skypan =

Filmmaking lighting instrument

In filmmaking, a skypan is used by the director of photography for lighting scenery that lies outside a set's window or door. Skypans are circular with an upraised ridge around the outside (when laid flat they resemble a frying pan without a handle). It is made up of a reflective white pan that has a detachable heavy-duty lamp socket rigged in front of the pan by being clamped to the lip. This is positioned to keep the lamp filament in the middle of the reflector. The skypan is used mainly when raw power is required, spreading a bright light that allows large-scale coverage of a background set. Either 2K or 5K bulbs are generally used. A skypan is usually confined to studio work and rigged up to a scaffold or ceiling-mounted pipe grid. When regularly spaced, they are also useful for lighting green and blue screens.

Skypans are available in different densities. Skypans of around 5,000 Watts can provide soft fill light for backdrops and cycloramas (cycs) in television, film and still photography. Skypans of around 10,000 Watts provide soft and even fill light for large backdrops and cycs, while ones rated up to 20,000 Watts would be more suitable for extremely large cycs. Softer fill light can be provided by adding diffusers. Generally, only two accessories are used in conjunction with the skypan; metal skirts that can be attached to the skypan to direct the spill of light, and gel frames.

== See also ==
- Key light
- High-key lighting
- Low-key lighting
- Stage lighting instrument
